= History of Gaza =

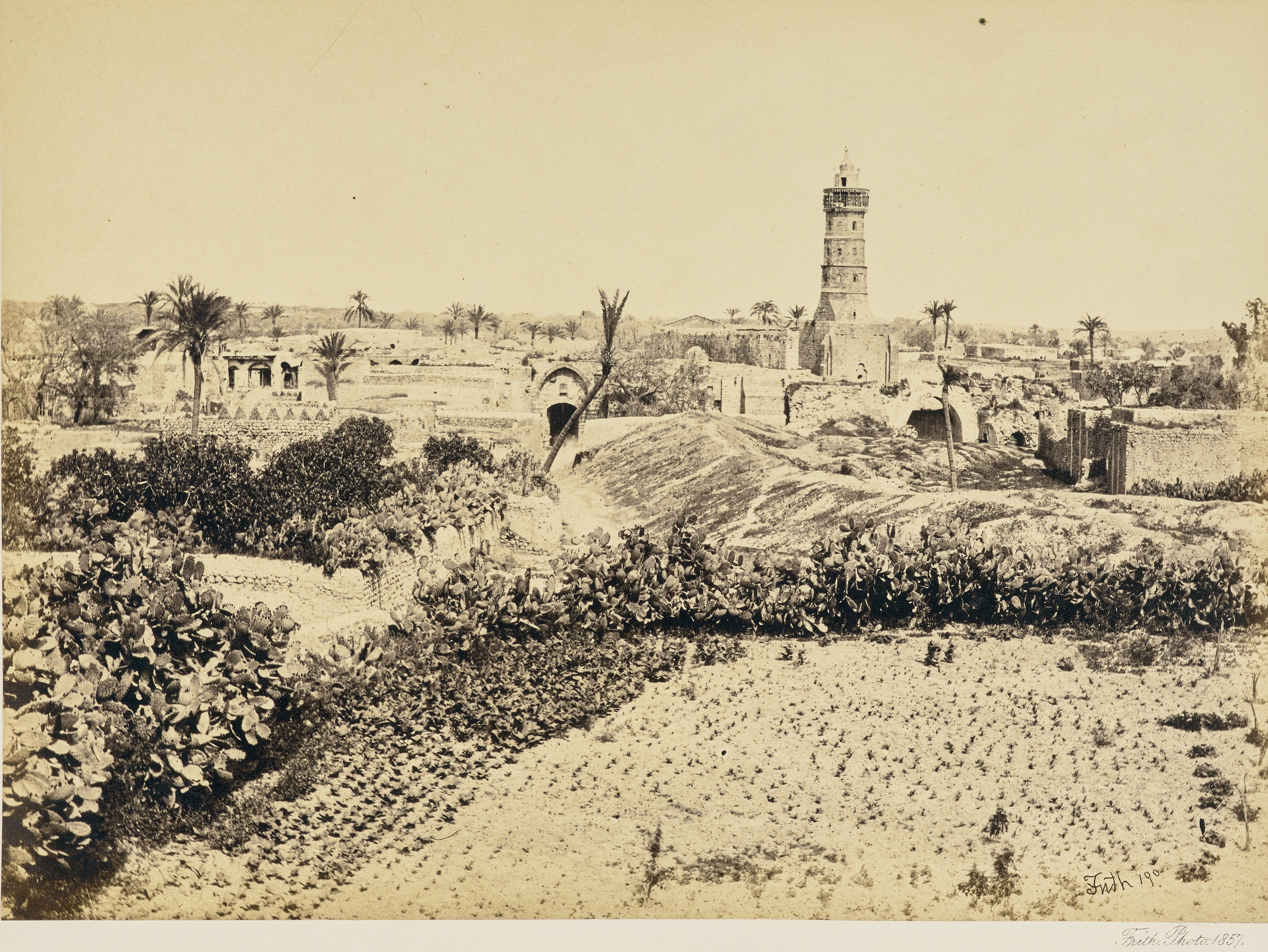
The Old Town of Gaza (1862–1863). Picture by Francis Frith

Gaza as depicted in the Survey of Palestine map (1934–1939), lying between the two river wadis of Wadi el Hesi to the north and Wadi Gaza in the south

The known history of Gaza spans more than 5,000 years, and it has been ruled, destroyed and inhabited by various dynasties, empires, and peoples. Its position at the intersection of two ancient trade routes, the Via Maris and the Perfume route, meant that all manner of exotic and essential goods, as well as people, from all over the Old World passed through its port for more than three millennia. Gaza’s own people and products also moved through these trade networks.

Originally an independent Canaanite cultural hub already renown in the 15th century BCE, Gaza first came under the control of the ancient Egyptians before re-emerging as an independent city kingdom, one of the pentapolis of Philistia. Gaza's king Hanunu was obliged to pay tribute to the Assyrian Empire beginning around 730 BC; however, the kingdom retained a degree of political and economic autonomy, even after being incorporated into the Achaemenid empire, and was among the first polities to mint its own coins in the Mediterranean region.

Alexander the Great besieged and assaulted the city in 332 BCE, killing and capturing most of its inhabitants, and the city was resettled by its neighbouring inhabitants, becoming a center for Hellenistic learning and philosophy. The area changed hands regularly between two Greek successor-kingdoms, the Seleucids of Syria and the Ptolemies of Egypt, until it was besieged and taken by the Hasmoneans in 96 BC, shortly before their own dynasty disintegrated.

Gaza was rebuilt by Roman General Pompey Magnus after 63 BCE, and allotted to the administrative territories of Roman client king Herod the Great thirty years later, but as an independent unit, and the Herodian dynasty too disintegrated, while Gaza endured. Throughout the Roman period, Gaza maintained its prosperity, receiving grants from several different emperors. A diverse, 500-member senate governed the city during this time. Conversion to Christianity in the city was spearheaded and completed under Saint Porphyrius, who destroyed its eight pagan temples between 396 and 420 AD.

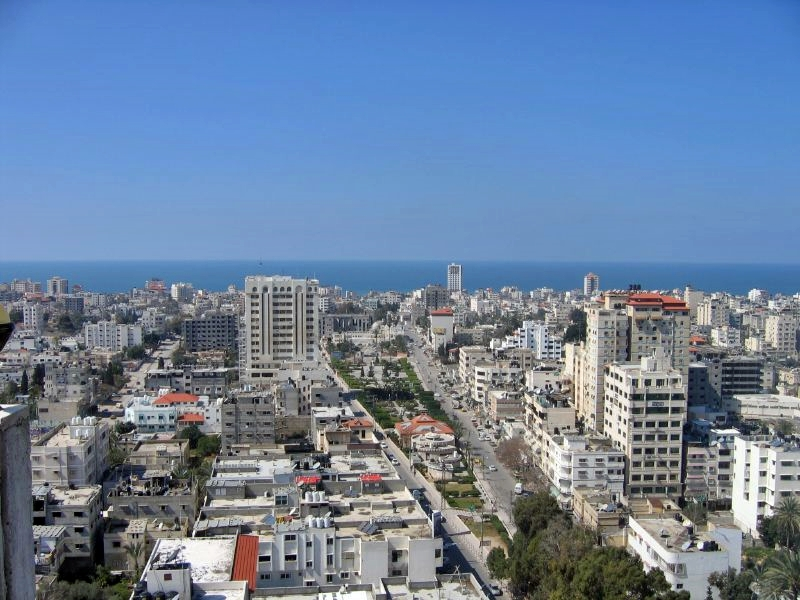
View of Gaza City (2006)

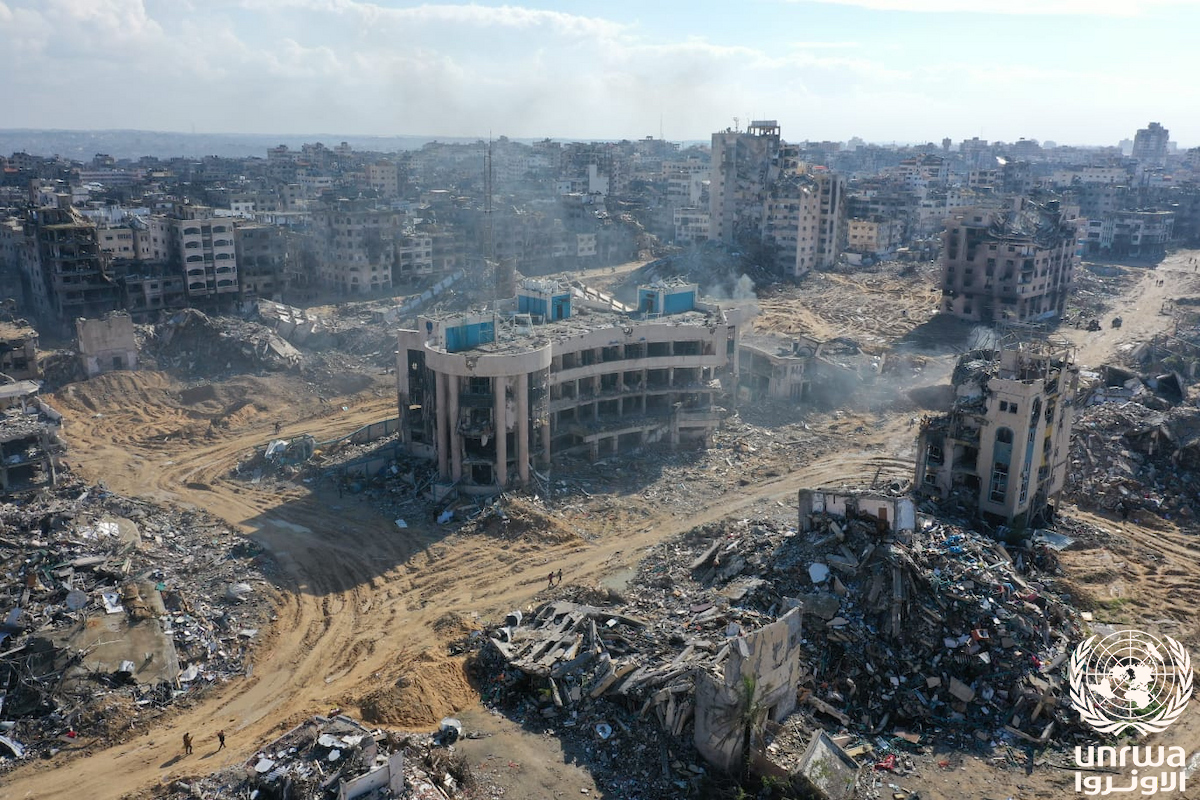
View of the Sheikh Radwan neighborhood of Gaza City in February 2024

Gaza was conquered, along with the rest of Palestine and Syria, by general Amr ibn al-'As in 637 AD. Most of its inhabitants adopted Islam over the course of the next 1,300 years of Islamic rule, interrupted only by a century or so when Crusaders wrested control of Gaza from the Fatimids in 1100, but were driven out by Saladin. Gaza was in Mamluk hands by the late 13th century, and had again become a regional capitol. It witnessed a golden age under the Ottoman-appointed Ridwan dynasty in the 16th century.

Gaza experienced destructive earthquakes in 1903 and 1914. In 1917, during World War I, British forces captured the city. Gaza grew significantly in the first half of the 20th century under Mandatory rule. The population of the city swelled as a result of the Palestinian exodus during the 1948 Arab–Israeli War. Gaza became a center of confrontation during the Israeli–Palestinian conflict, being occupied and blockaded by Israel. The city was largely destroyed during the Gaza war and genocide, though hundreds of thousands of inhabitants still live there.

== Bronze Age ==
=== Tell es-Sakan ===
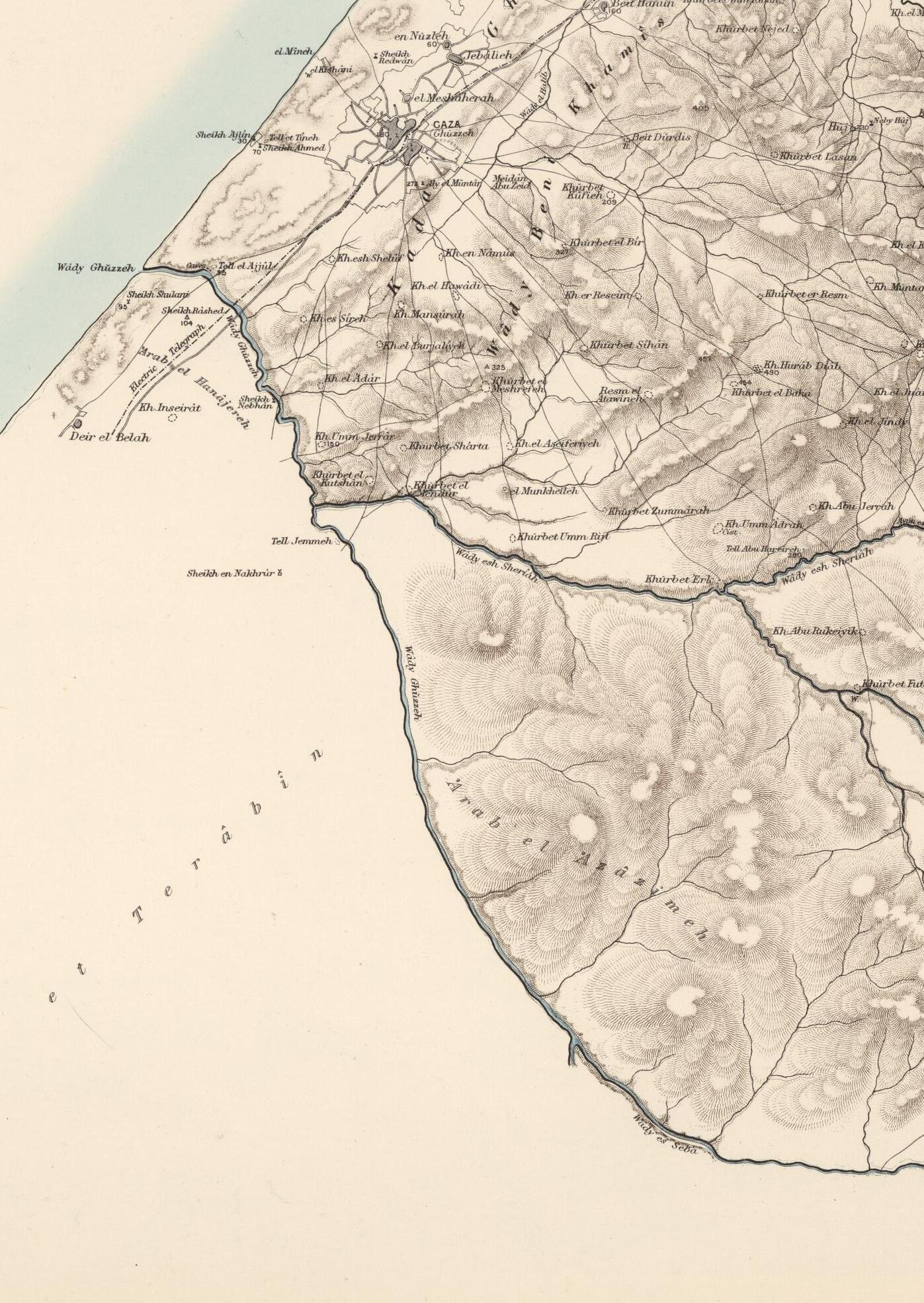
Map of Wadi Gaza in the Palestine Exploration Fund Survey of Western Palestine (1888) showing the position of Tell el-Ajjul. Tell es-Sakan is located 500 meters to the north of it and not pictured because it was only discovered by accident in 1998. The location of Tell Jemmeh is also indicated on the southern side of the wadi.

The earliest documented urban settlements in the region of Gaza date back to the 34th century BCE at Taur Ikhbeineh. Its immediate successor site emerged around the same time at Tell es-Sakan (3300-3000 BCE) – a site located south of the present-day Gaza City – which began as an Ancient Egyptian fortress. The archaeologists who excavated Tell es-Sakan, Pierre de Miroschedji and Moain Sadeq, suggest that there were three areas of Egyptian settlement in Gaza and the wider region of Palestine: an area of permanent settlement with Tell es-Sakan as the administrative centre; areas of seasonal habitation extending north up the coast; and the rest of Palestine where Egyptians had trading contact with Canaanites. Tell es-Sakan prospered as Canaanite cities began to trade agricultural goods with the Egyptians. However, when Egypt's economic interests shifted to the cedar trade with Lebanon, Gaza's role was reduced to that of a port for ships carrying goods and it declined economically. The site was virtually abandoned and remained so throughout the Early Bronze Age II.

Gaza enjoyed demographic and economic growth again when the local Canaanite population began to resettle Tell es-Sakan around 2500, but in 2250, the area experienced a total collapse of civilization and all of the cities in the Gaza region were abandoned by the 23rd century BCE. In its place emerged semi-nomadic cultures with pastoral camps made up of rustic family dwellings which continued to exist throughout the Early Bronze Age IV.

=== Tell el-Ajjul ===
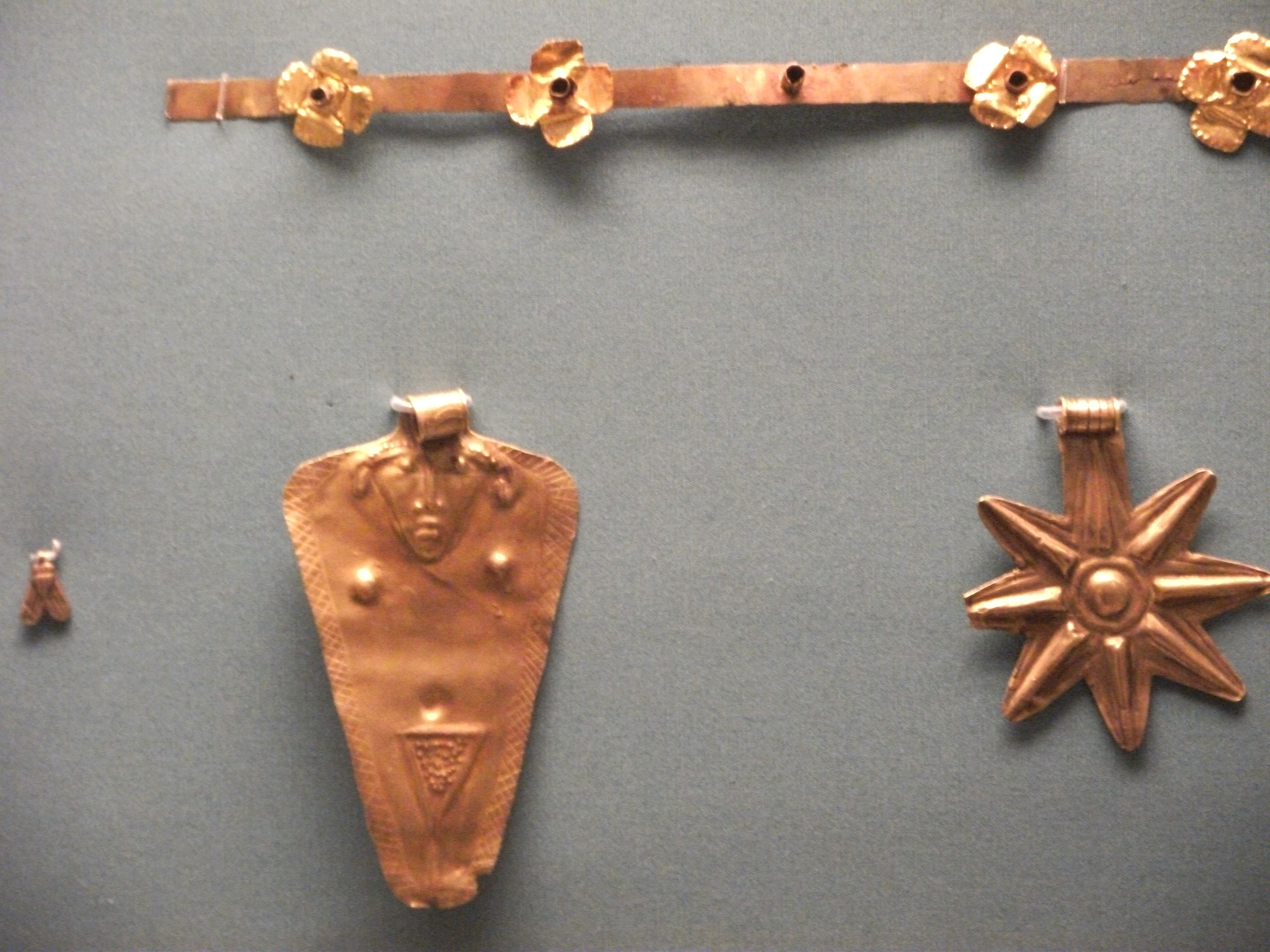
Items from the Tell el-Ajjul gold hoards, including the pendant thought to depict Astarte, housed in the collection of the British Museum

An urban center known as Tell el-Ajjul began to arise inland along the northern bank of the Wadi Ghazza riverbed, along with al-Moghraqa which was likely a satellite settlement less than 1 kilometre (0.62 mi) from Tell el-Ajjul. Burial practice at Tell el-Ajjul was found to be similar to those of the Bronze Age site of Taur Ikhbeineh. More than 500 scarabs, all but a dozen the work of local Canaanite artisans, were found in Tell el-Ajjul in excavations by Flinders Petrie, who dated the finds to between the Twelfth and Fifteenth dynasties of Egypt, some carrying the names of Egyptian Pharaohs like Amenemhat II, and others, those of the Canaanite Hyksos dynasty, like Yakbim Sekhaenre and Apepi.

One of the most significant ancient artisanal precious metal collections ever found in the region of the Levant was also discovered during Petrie's excavations. The Tell el-Ajjul gold hoards included finely worked gold jewellery using a variety of techniques, expressing both Egyptian and Syrian influences, as well as local Canaanite religious beliefs. One of the pendants is made from hammered gold sheet and depicts a mother goddess figure, likely Astarte, resembling a find from Minat el-Beida in northern Syria. Many of the items were taken outside of Palestine and appear in collections in the British Museum.

During the Middle Bronze Age, Tell es-Sakan was the southernmost locality in Canaanite territory, reduced to serving as a fort. It enjoyed a brief revival by 1650 BCE, while Egypt was ruled in part by these Canaanite Hyksos, with a second city developing on the ruins of the first, but was destroyed about a century later.

Another important site to understanding the history of Gaza is Tell el-Jemmeh, located on the southern bank of the Wadi Gaza more inland on a small hill rising 45 m, and identified with the Canaanite town of Yurza (neo-Assyrian era site of Arza), continuously inhabited from the Bronze Age through to the Persian period.

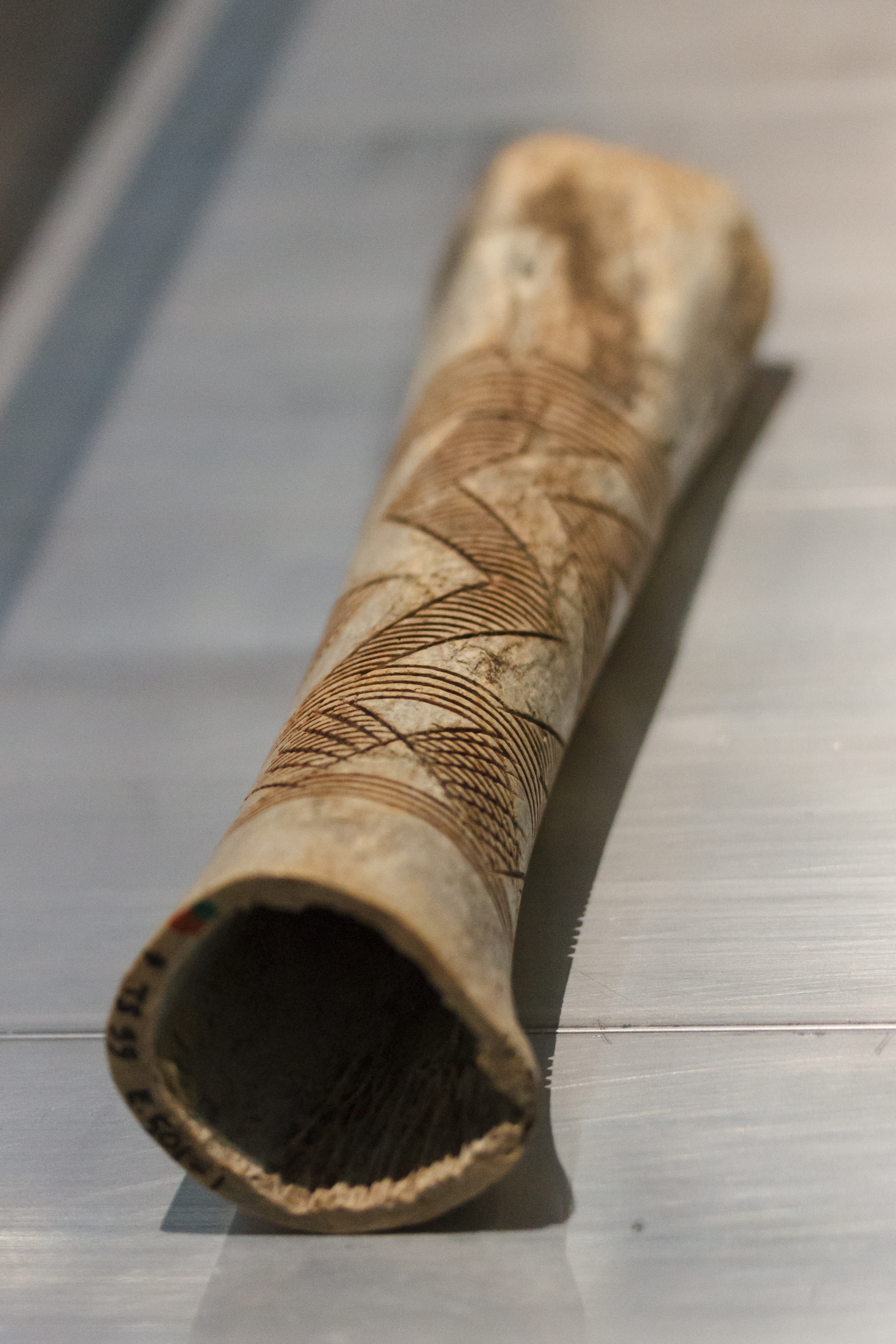
Geometric carvings on bone, discovered in Tell es-Sakan, dated to between 2700 and 2350 BCE

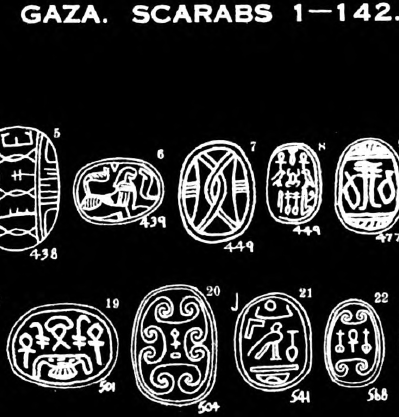
Sketches of some designs inscribed on more than 500 scarabs found in Tell el-Ajjul in excavations by Flinders Petrie

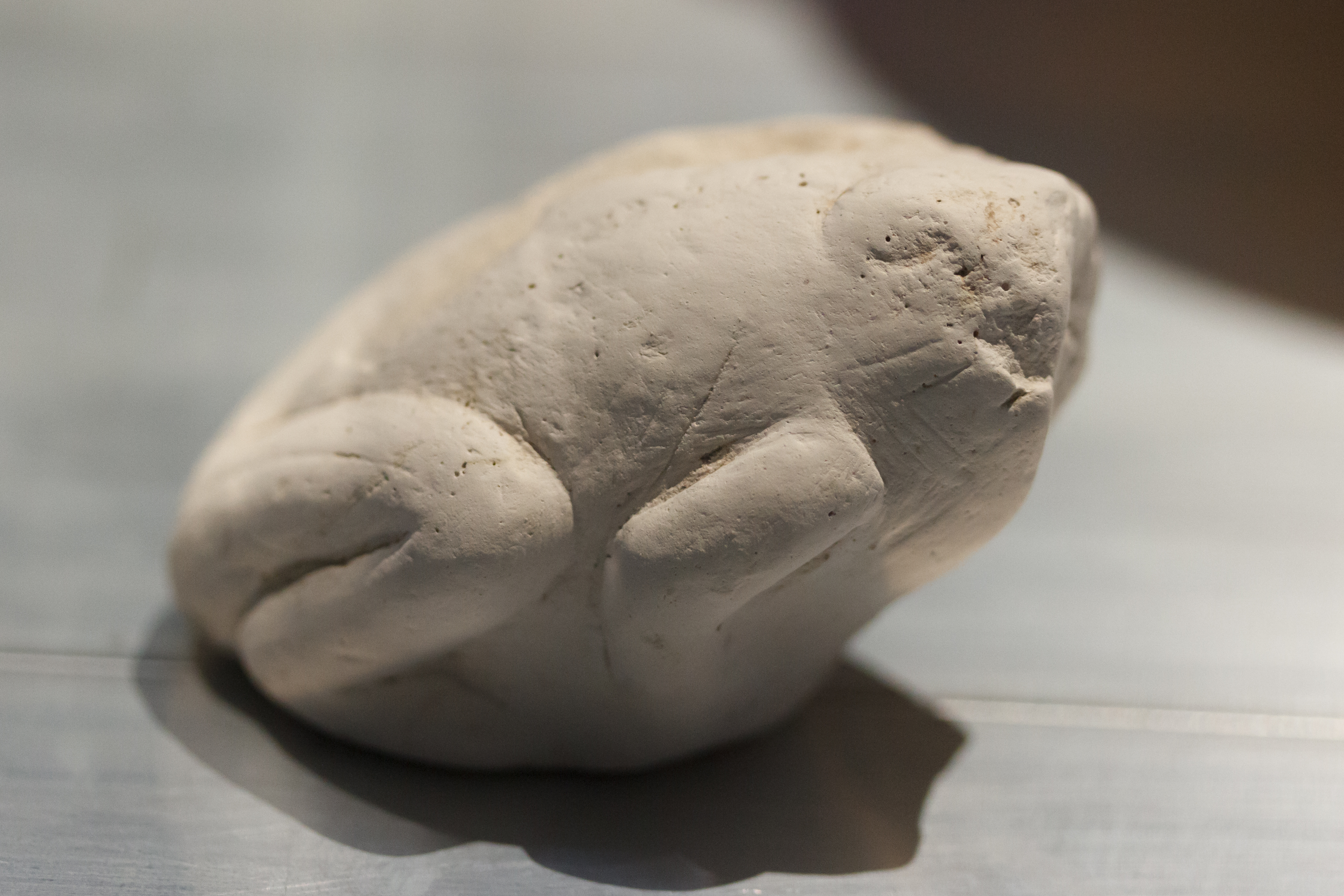
Figurine of a frog carved from limestone found in Tell es-Sakan and dated to the 4th millennium BCE

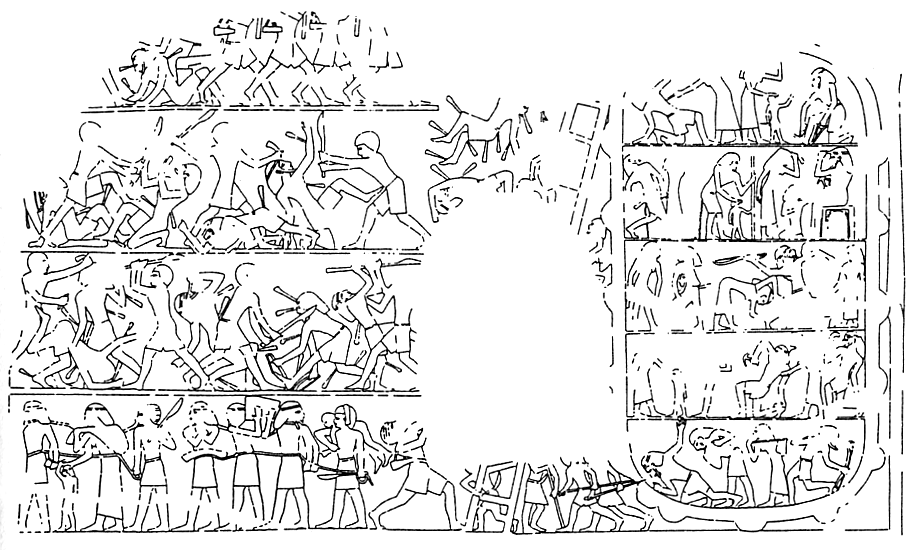
Relief from the tomb of Inti at Dishasha. A walled settlement is depicted on the right that Pierre de Miroschedji suggests may be Tell es-Sakan.

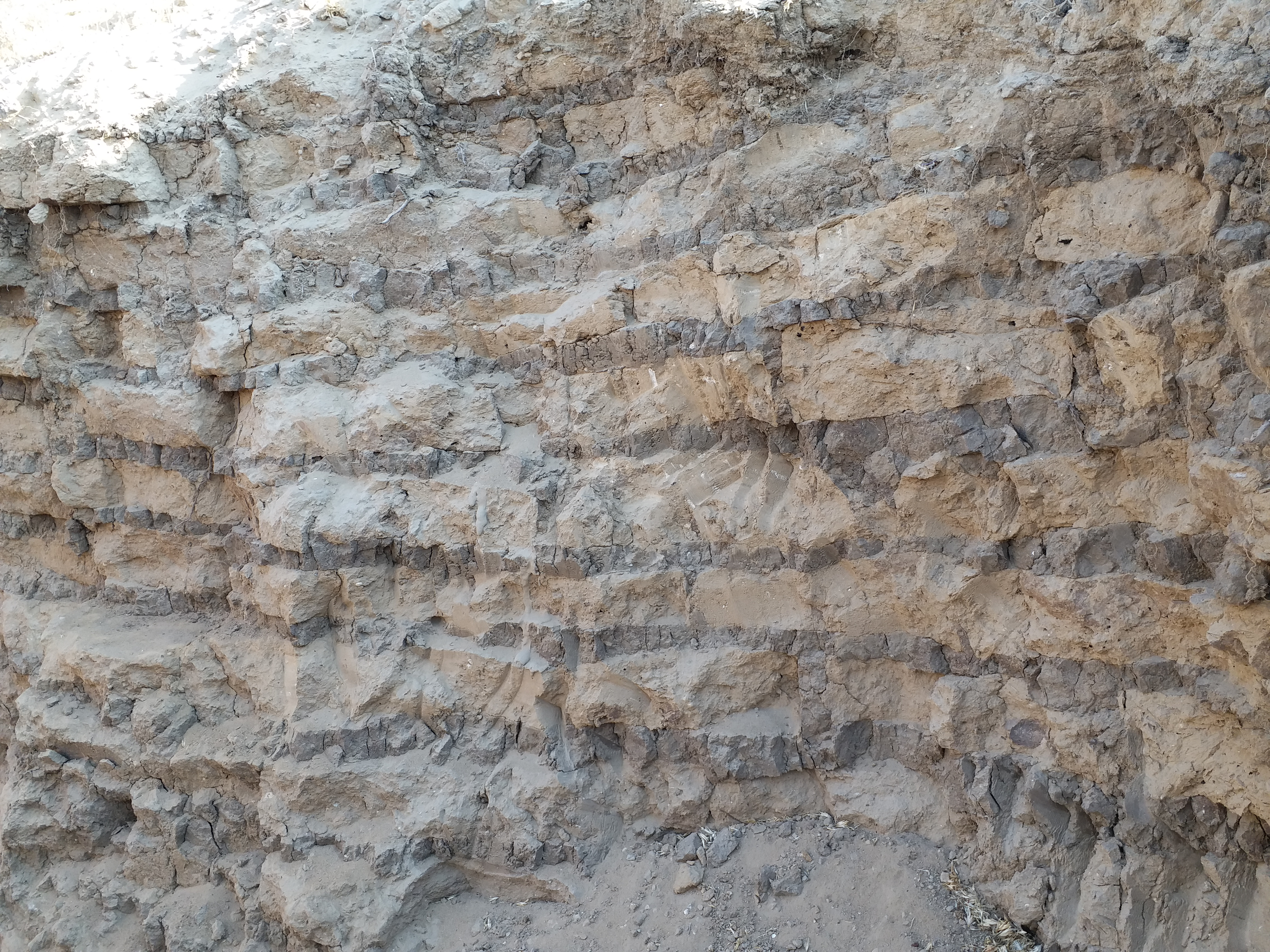
A wall excavated in Tell es-Sakan

=== The name Gaza enters history ===
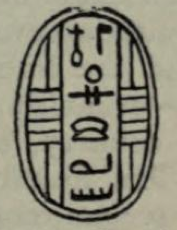
Scarab seal of Yakbim Sekhaenre from Tell el-Ajjul, now likely in the Petrie Museum

The city which would develop into Gaza began to emerge on the site of Tell el-Ajjul around the 17th-16th centuries BCE. In the mid-16th century BCE, Egyptian pharaoh Ahmose I completed his victory over the Hyksos by conquering their stronghold Sharuhen, identified by some as Tell el-Ajjul, after a three-year siege. Egypt settled Gaza once again and Tell el-Ajjul rose for the third time in the 15th century BCE.

It is in this period that the name Gaza appears, and frequently, in Egyptian and Assyrian records. A caravan point of strategic importance from the earliest times, it was constantly implicated in the wars between Egypt and Syria and the Mesopotamian powers. Inscribed on the walls of the Temple of Karnak is a description of Tuthmosis III's annual military campaigns along the Syrian-Egyptian caravan route, where he mentions reaching "That-Which-The Ruler Seized, [of which the Syrian name is] Gaza", on the feast day for the king's coronation (est. April 25, 1486 BCE).

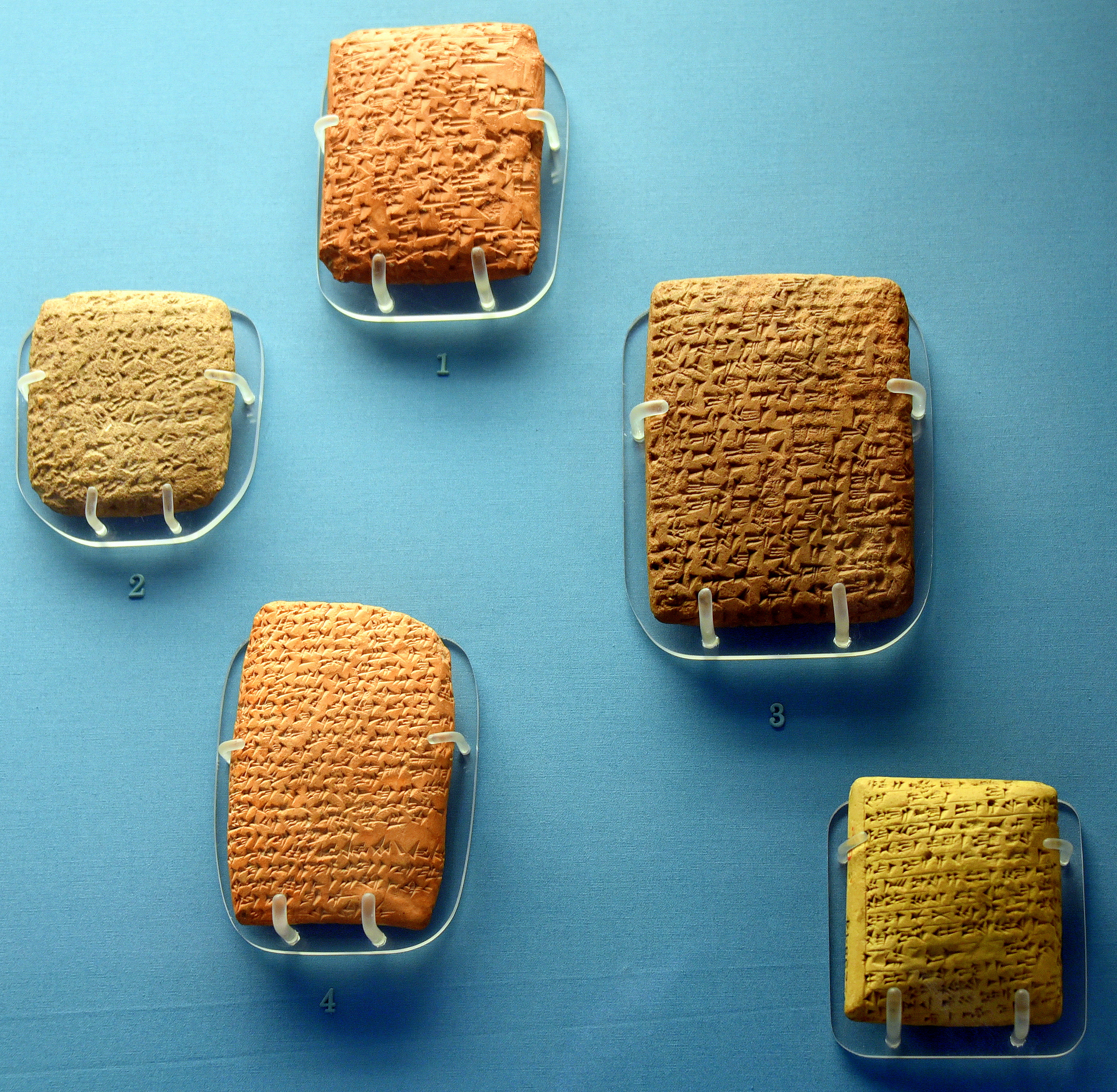
Five Amarna letters on display at the British Museum, London

Gaza is also mentioned in the Amarna letters as "ḫazzatu". These letters record that Gaza served as the capital of southern Canaan and was the residence of the Egyptian governor of the region, Addaya, who was also the commander of the Egyptian garrison, and seems to have held jurisdiction over Shechem (Amarna letter EA 254) and Jerusalem (EA 289). Abdi-Heba laments that Jerusalem is not accorded the same attention or support by the pharaoh as is Gaza (Amarna letter EA 289).

In the Papyrus Anastasi I, a satirical hieratic Egyptian text used for the training of scribes in the period of the Ramessid dynasty, Gaza makes another appearance. In a description of the places on the high road to Canaan (Way of Horus) through the Sinai, Hori mocks the lack of knowledge of Amenemope, asking if he knows how far Gaza, the final stop, is from Rafah. The mention to "the town of the Canaan" in this same text is also seen as another way of referring to Gaza, emphasizing its status as an important capital of this area.

== Iron Age ==
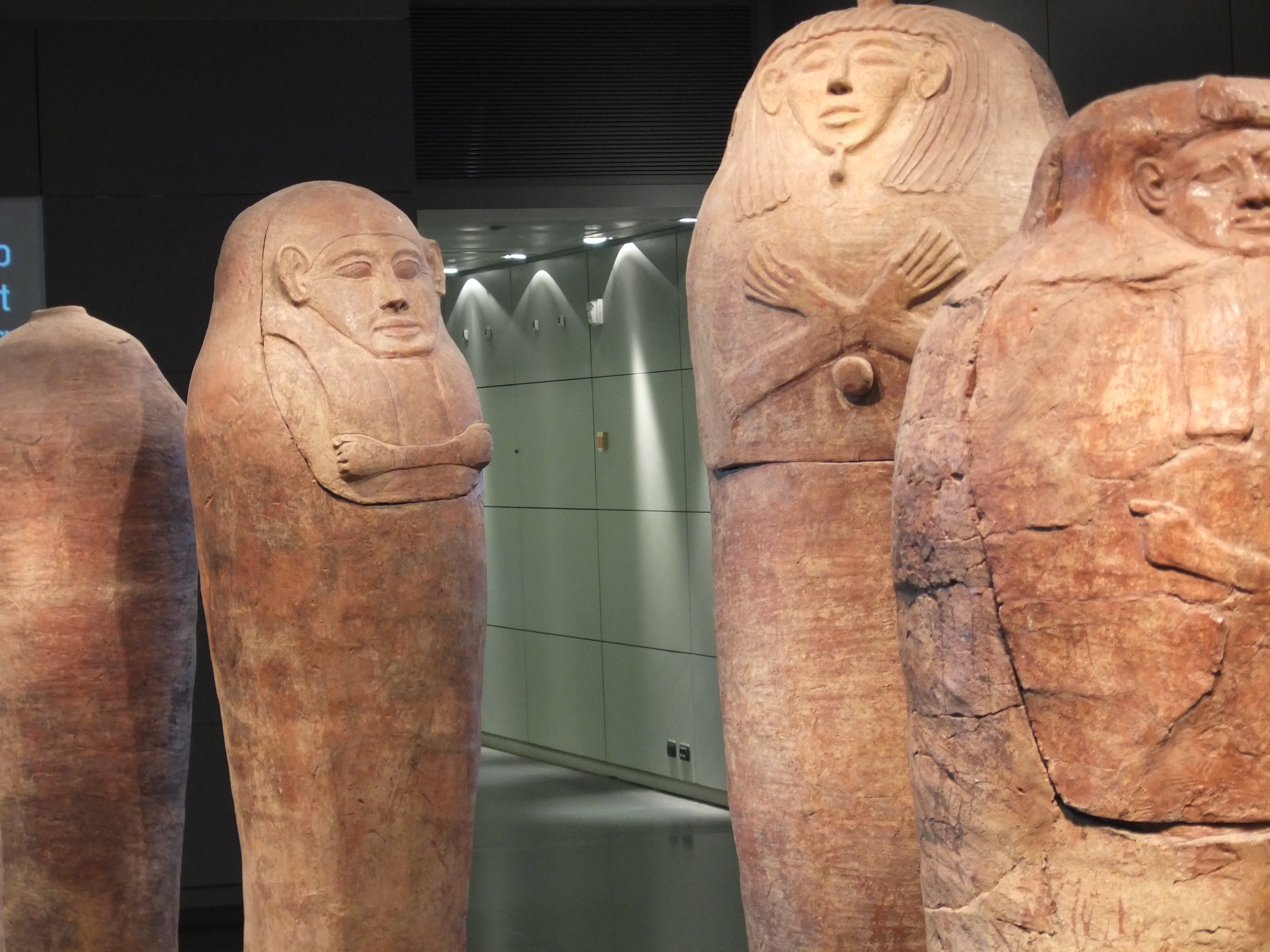
Canaanite sarcophagi from Deir al Balah on display at the Israel Museum in Jerusalem

Several early Iron Age sites near Gaza City have been investigated by archaeologists, yielding incredibly rich finds dated to the Ramessid era, such as the Deir el-Balah sarcophagi, some 14 km to the south. Created locally and influenced by Egyptian styles, many of the coffins were looted by Moshe Dayan in the late 1960s before salvage excavations were conducted in the 1970s and 1980s, and some of the sarcophagi have ended up in the Israel Museum, the Hecht Museum, and the Bible Lands Museum. The practice of using anthropoid sarcophagi for burials began in Egypt and was later adopted by the Philistines.

=== Philistia ===
Philistia in the broader Ancient Near East context at around 1000 BCE

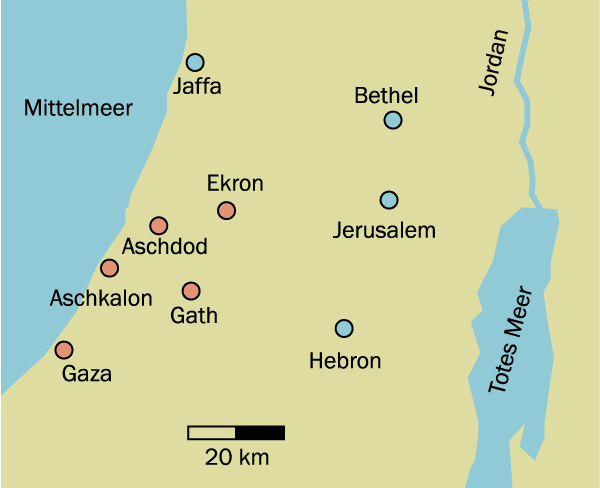
Philistine pentapolis cities shown in red: Gaza, Ashdod, Ashkelon, Ekron, and Gath.

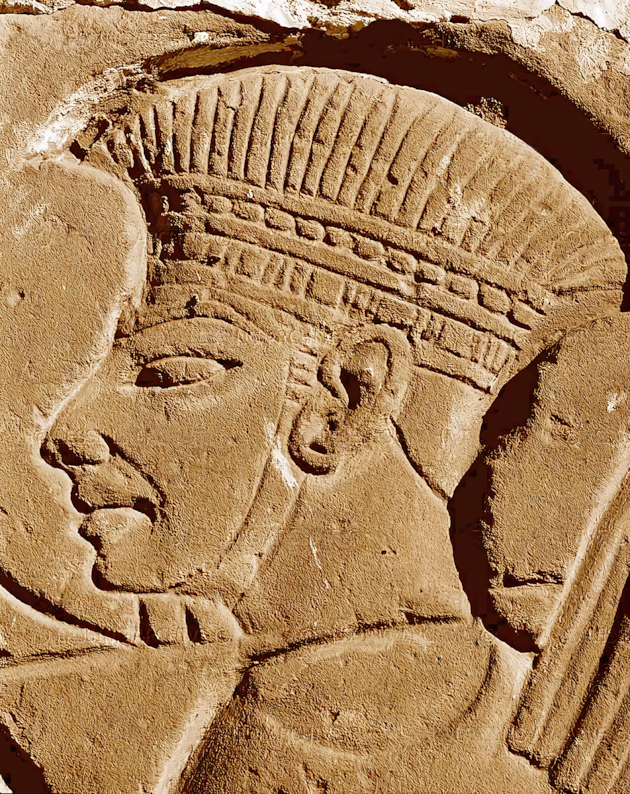
Peleset warrior from the Medinet Habu temple; Peleset are generally identified with the Philistines.

Investigation of the Iron Age activity on the tell upon which the Old City of Gaza itself sits has been hindered by the dense urban fabric and sociopolitical conditions. Excavations at Tell Jemmeh, the closet Philistine city located 12 km to south of Gaza City in the Negev has helped shed more light on the history of the early and late Iron Age period.

What is clear in the historical record is that in this period, Gaza emerged as one of five Philistine city-states, each ruled by a king, and that for some 550 years, this city-centered kingdom exercised some independence, even when subjected to overarching and alternating Egyptian or Assyrian imperial rule.

Gaza is one of three cities mentioned in the Egyptian Onomasticon of Amenope (c. 1100 BCE), along with Isdud (Ashdod) and Asqalan. It is mentioned in association with a people named as Peleshet. Several scholars also see "the Canaan" of "Philistia" mentioned in an inscription (c. 950-800 BCE) on the Padiiset statue as referring to Gaza.

==== In the Hebrew Bible ====
The Hebrew Bible mentions the Avvites occupying an area that extended as far as Gaza, and that these people were dispossessed by the Caphtorites from the island of Caphtor (modern Crete). Some scholars speculate that the Philistines were descendants of the Caphtorites. Gaza is also mentioned in the Hebrew Bible as the place where Samson was imprisoned and met his death. The prophets Amos and Zephaniah are believed to have prophesied that Gaza would be deserted.

According to biblical accounts, Gaza fell to Israelite rule during the reign of King David in the early 11th century BCE, and when the United Monarchy split around 930 BCE, the territory of the Philistines, including Gaza, became part of the Kingdom of Judah. Historians and archaeologists today generally eschew treating the Bible as a historical source and identify these stories about Israelite/Judean rule over Philistia as mythical.

==== Under Assyria and Egypt ====
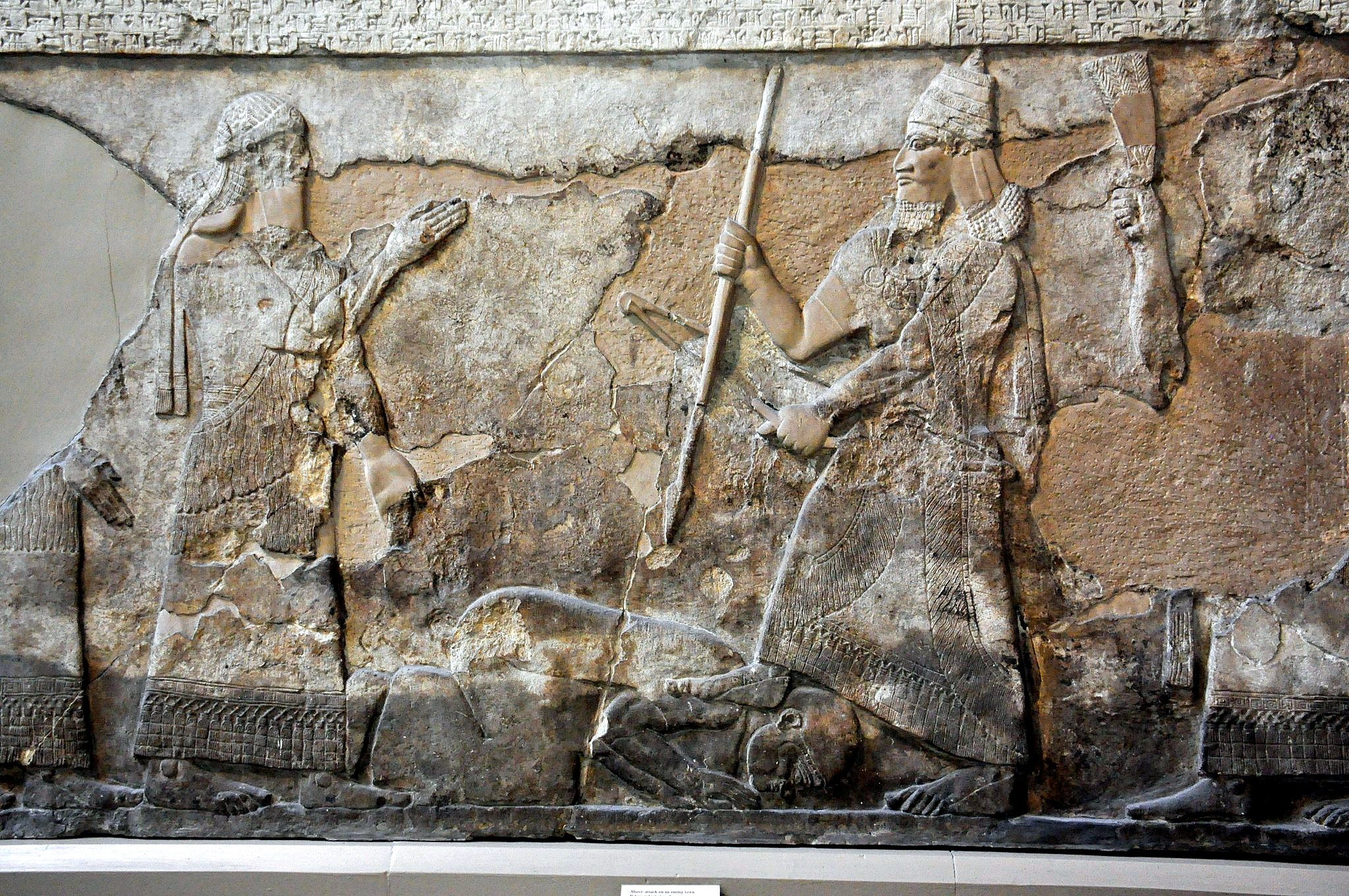
Tiglath-Pileser III trampling an enemy king, sometimes identified as Hanunu, in a relief from his palace in Kalhu. The conquest of Gaza, among other nations, are described in the surrounding inscriptions.

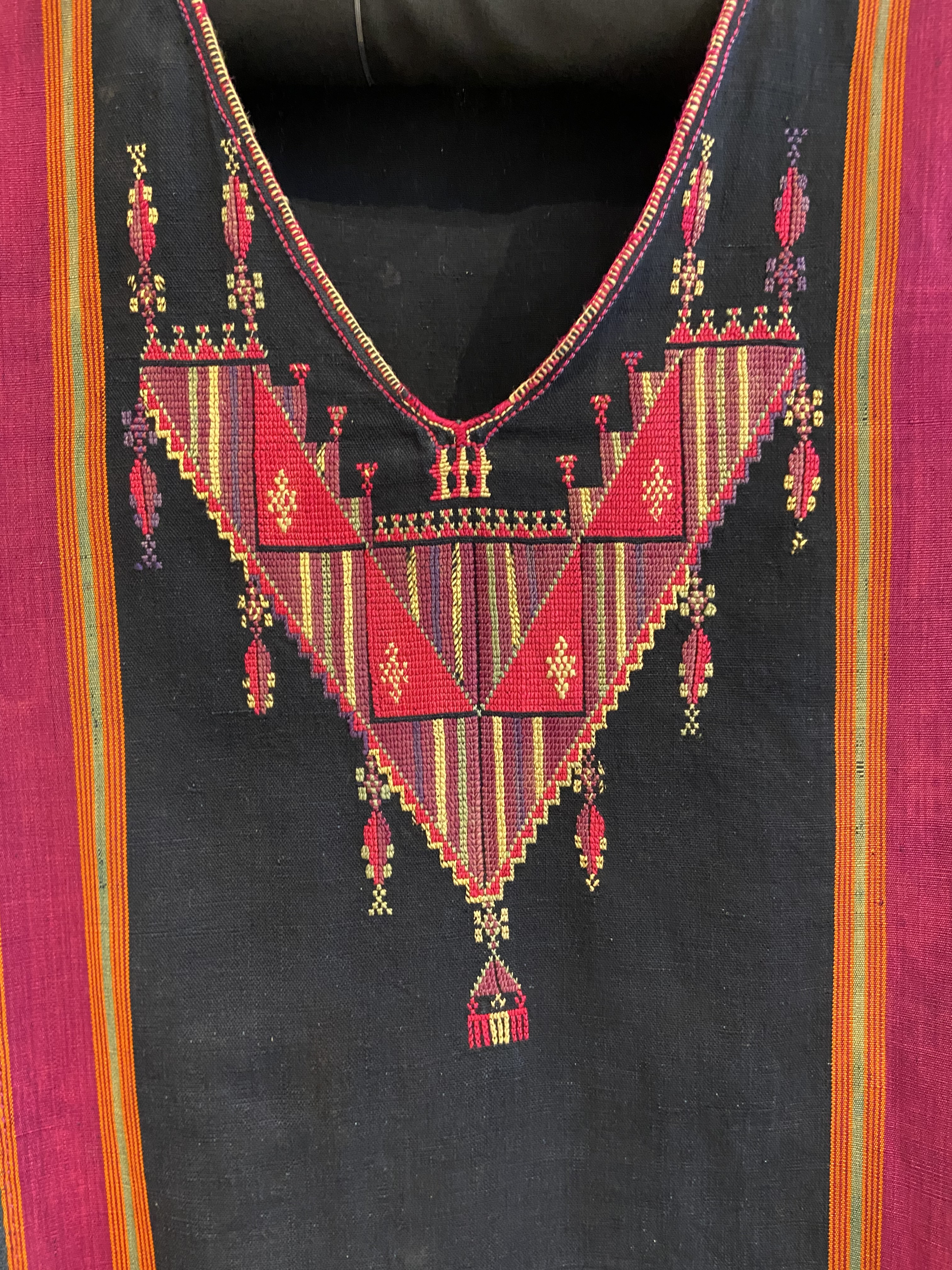
Tatreez, traditional Palestinian embroidery in the Gaza style for the chest panel of a dress

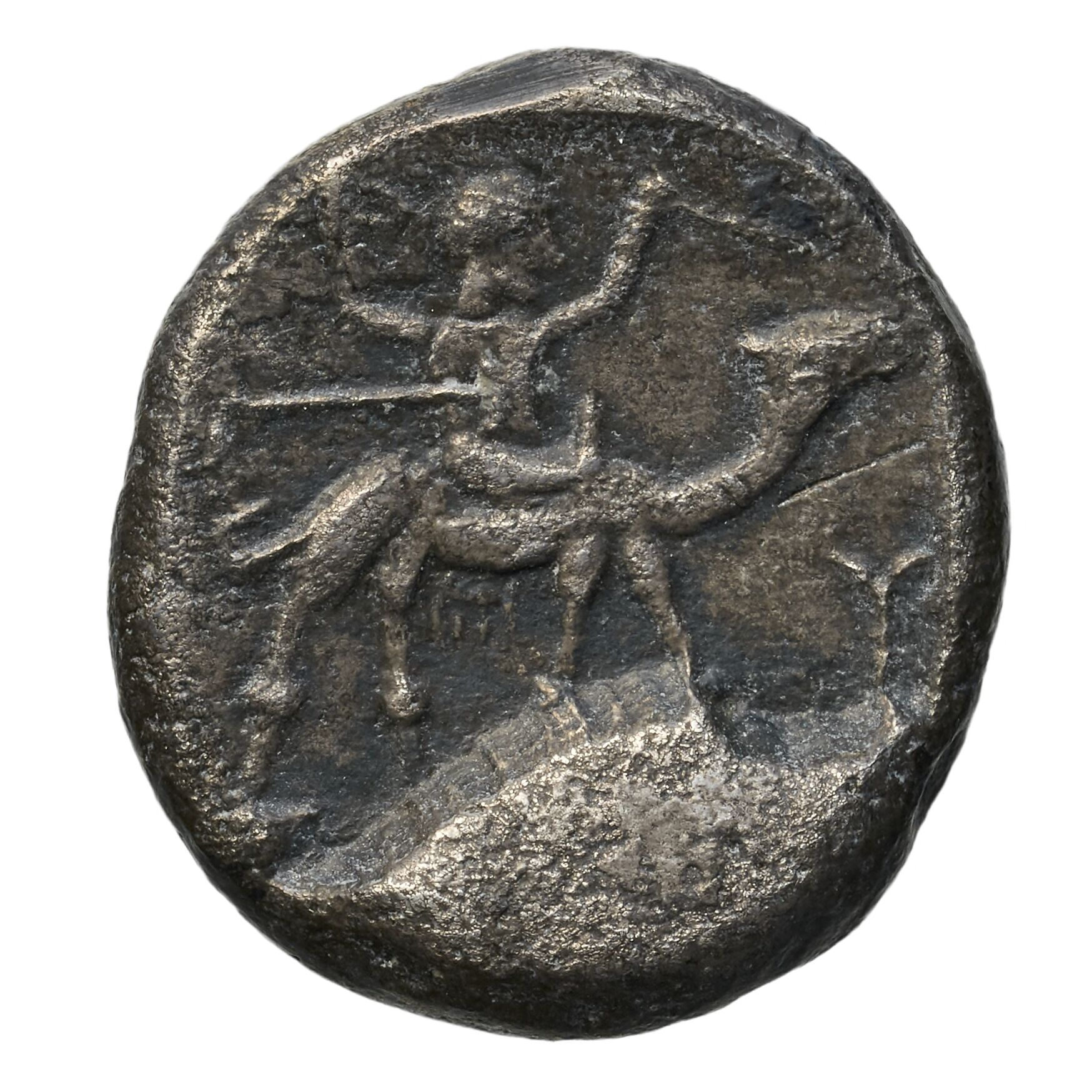
Silver drachma minted in Gaza, Palestine (450-331 BC)

Philistia was of very high importance to the Assyrians, and Gaza in particular, due its proximity to Egypt and being a key node in the trade of the incense route. In 734 BCE, when the Assyrians under Tiglath-Pileser III and Sargon II invaded Gaza, it had already been an established kingdom for centuries. The king of Gaza at the time, named in Assyrian inscriptions as Hanunu, is recorded as having fled to Egypt to escape the onslaught - likely to seek Egyptian support which did not then materialize - but was brought back by the Assyrian empire Gaza to submit to Assyrian imperial rule, and continued to rule as a client king. The relatively soft treatment Hanunu received, was likely due to Gaza's importance.

King Hanunu went on to join a rebellion of some of the kingdoms of Philistia against Assyrian rule under Sargon II in 720 BCE. The rebellions were brutally crushed and ended with the destruction of the city of Isdud (Ashdod) in 712 BCE and Raphia (Rafah) in 713 BCE. Sargon II forcibly exiled more than 9000 people from the region, including King Hanunu of Gaza. Gaza retained its semi-autonomous status as a vassal kingdom, and was not outright annexed, but it was designated an 'Assyrian customs station' (bit kari ga Assur), a status closer to a province than a vassal state.

The name of the king who immediately succeeded Hanunu in Gaza is not recorded, but in 701 BCE Sil-Bel is named as the king of Gaza in descriptions of Sennacherib's campaign in the Levant. Egyptian forces had compelled many of the Palestinian city kingdoms, including Gaza, to participate in their anti-Assyrian campaign, which coincided with the revolt of Hezekiah of Judah against Assyrian rule. Sennacherib and the Assyrian forces put down the revolt and pushed back Egyptian forces. According to Sennacherib's Annals, Sil-Bel, along with his fellow Philistine kings, Mitinti of Ascalon and Padi of Ekron, were given several fortified Judean cities that Sennacherib had conquered during his campaign.

Gaza is also listed in Assyrian tablets from this time as paying tributes to the empire, including materials for the building of Esarhaddon's palace in Nineveh. Other forms of tribute listed include locally produced textiles with multi-colored edges which were worked on warp-weighted looms. This was just one of several local products and industries operating in the city and its vicinity, which enjoyed massive wealth accrued from maritime trade, with dozens of trading posts, customs, and service stations operating there throughout the period of Assyrian and Persian rule.

==== Under Persia and Babylonia ====
During the Persian period (6th–4th centuries BCE) Gaza enjoyed a certain independence and flourished. In 601/600 BCE, Babylonian king Nebuchadnezzar II was defeated by the Egyptian army under pharaoh Necho II at Migdol near Gaza; however, it was captured by Nebuchadnezzar during his second unsuccessful campaign to invade Egypt in 568 BCE.

The minting of coins in Gaza began during its time as part of the fifth Persian satrapy of Philistia ("beyond the river"), along with the other Palestinian coastal cities in 538 BC and the Gaza mint continued producing until Alexander the Great conquered Gaza in 332 BC, with coins minted on the Athens model beginning around 420–410 BCE.

In 529 BCE, Cambyses I unsuccessfully attacked Gaza, which is recalled in Herodotus' 5th century BCE work Histories, where Gaza is referred to as Cadytis, and described as not a lesser city than Sardis. Herodotus notes that the only way to for anyone to enter Egypt by land (from the north) is to pass "from Phoenicia to Cadytis [which] belongs to the Syrians who are called of Palestine." He also writes that Arabs controlled the area from Gaza to Jenissus (Khan Yunis). Gaza itself was designated a free trade zone by the Empire.

Economic activity flourished, with the coastal Arabs of this area, who were probably ruled by a king, considered friends (xeinoi) of the Empire, supplying water to Cambyses' forces in his 525 BCE campaign against Egypt and safeguarding trade routes. Qedarite Arab kings further to the south and east who regularly accessed Gaza's port gave gifts or tributes to the Persians in the amount of 1,000 talents (25,000 kg) of frankincense annually.

== Hellenistic period (330 BCE - 63 BCE) ==
Gaza's name appears in Greek during this period as Γάζα. The exact same word in Greek, an apparently etymologically unrelated Persian loanword, means "treasure". Several literary references to this paronomasia are made in Greek texts during this period, attesting to Gaza's renown (see for example the Bible's New Testament in Acts 8: 26–40).

=== Alexander, Ptolemies and Seleucids ===
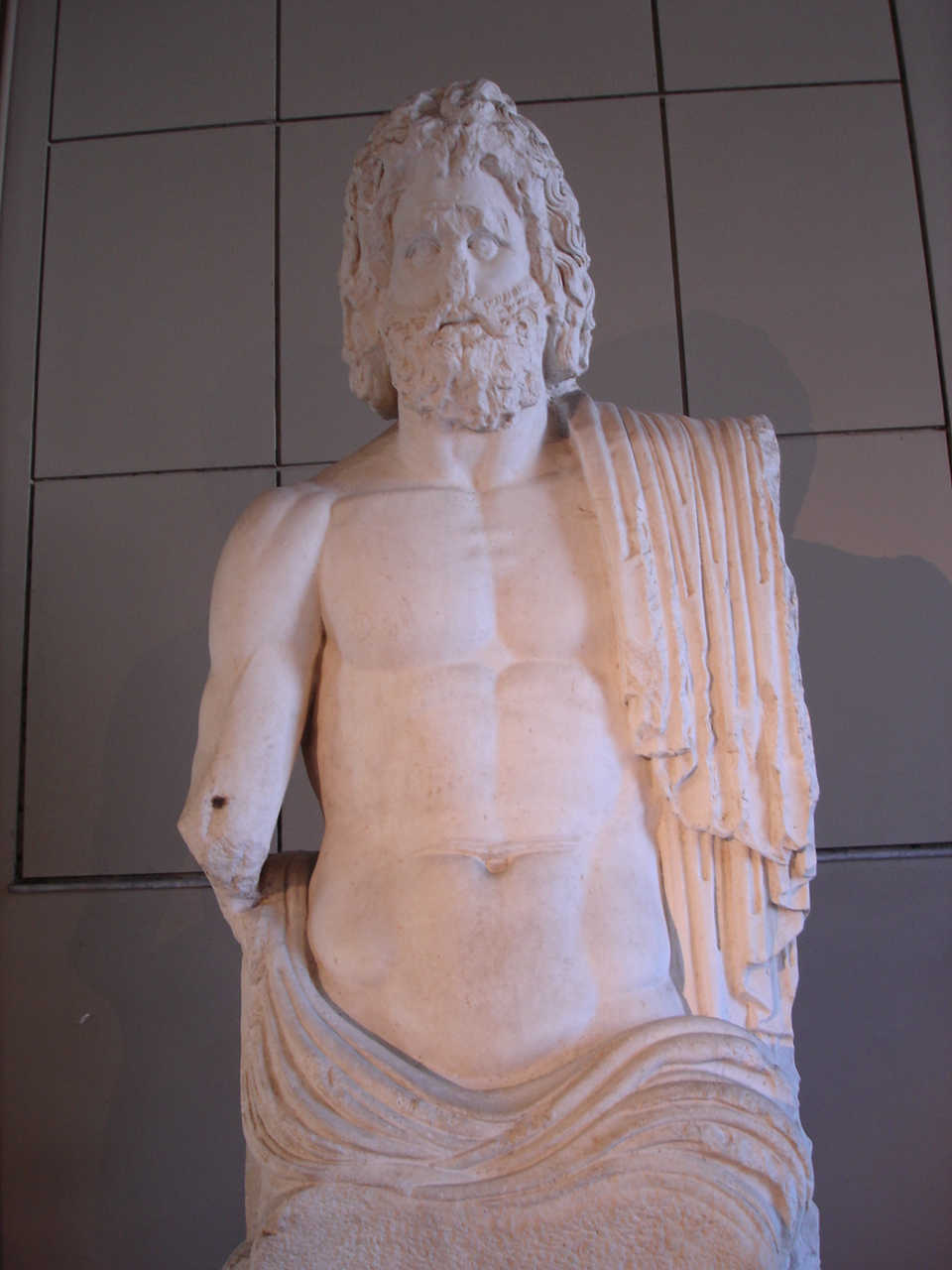
Statue of Dagon/Marnas from Gaza portrayed in the style of Zeus unearthed in Gaza in Tell es-Sanam

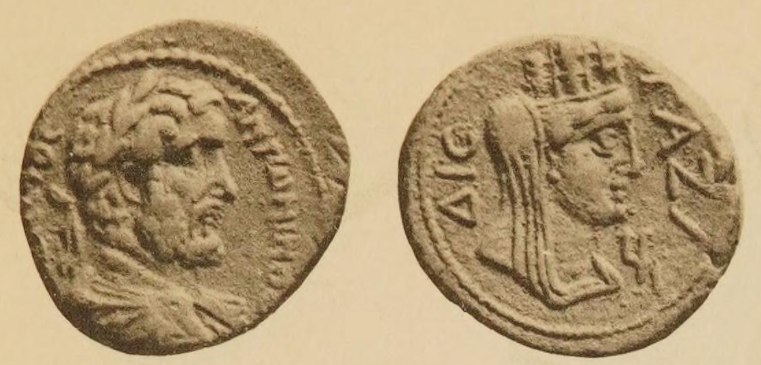
Hellenistic coin from the Gaza mint.

Alexander the Great besieged Gaza—the last city to resist his conquest on his path to Egypt—for five months, finally capturing it in 332 BCE. Led by a Persian commander named Batis and defended by the Persian garrison and local Arab fighters, Gaza withstood the siege for two months, and an Arab pretending to be a deserter nearly managed to kill Alexander. The defenders, mostly local elements, fought to the death, but the city was overtaken, and the women and children were taken as captives. Gaza was then resettled by people from neighbouring tribes who were sympathetic to Alexander's rule.

Alexander organized the city into a polis or "city-state" and Greek culture took root in Gaza which gained a reputation as a flourishing center of Hellenic learning and philosophy. Hieronymus of Cardia mentions Gaza as a part of Syria, whereas Classical geographers assigned its adjacent coastal areas to Arabia. The Ptolemaic kingdom fought the Seleucids for control of Gaza and the Levant in perhaps the largest battle of the Hellenistic world in June of 217 BC, which even involved the use of elephants, known as the Battle of Raphia. The Seleucids lost the battle, and Antiochus III the Great was obliged to surrender personally to Ptolemy IV Philopator at Gaza, securing Ptolemaic rule over the area for a time. The Seleucids did not relent on their ambitions though, and gained control over much of the Levant and Gaza after winning the Battle of Panium much farther north in Banias in 200 BCE.

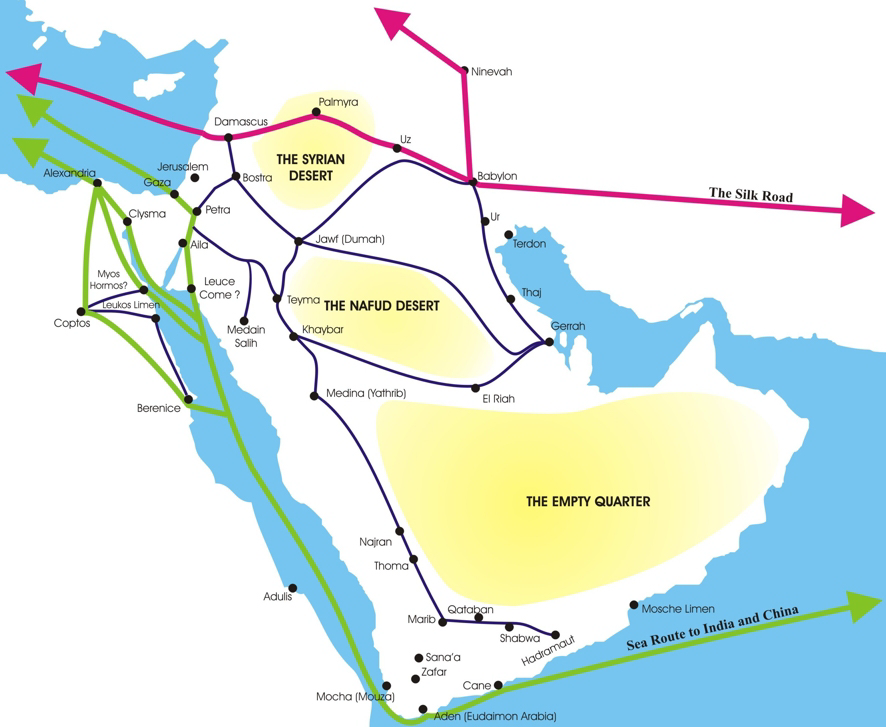
Nabataean trade routes including parts of the Silk Road, the Perfume route and Via Maris

In the second half of the second century BCE, the Gaza mint was again producing its own civic coins, bearing images of Zeus or Tyche, and this time with Greek inscriptions reading: "ΔΗΜΟΥ CΕΛ TWN [sic] EN ΓΑZHC ('of the people of the Seleucians who are in Gaza'), or ΔΗΜΟΥ ΓΑZΑIΩΝ ('of the people of the Gazans'), or ΔΗΜΟΥ ΓΑZΑΙΩΝ ΙΕΡ(ΑΣ) ΑΣY(ΛΟΥ) ('of the people of the sacred and inviolable [city] of the Gazans'". These coins testify to the special status the people in the city of Gaza enjoyed under Seleucid rule.

=== Nabateans and Hasmoneans ===
The Kingdom of Nabataea controlled much of the trade routes in and around Gaza throughout the Hellenistic period including a 170 km stretch of road that ran between Petra and Gaza through the Arabah and other Nabataean cities in the Negev like Oboda and Elusa known as the King's Way (Arabic: ضرب السلطان, romanized: translit, lit. 'darb es-sultan'). Gaza City served as the Mediterranean port of the Nabateans, with caravans arriving also carrying incense from Elath on the Red Sea.

Traditional historical accounts, citing Josephus say that in 96 BCE, the Hasmonean king Alexander Jannaeus besieged Gaza for a year, which had sided with Ptolemy IX Soter against him. According to Josephus, the inhabitants, who had hoped for help from the Nabataean king Aretas II, were killed and their city destroyed by Jannaeus when Aretas did not come to their aid. However, recent numismatic evidence indicates his account of the events may be greatly exaggerated, as several coins with the Gaza mint mark (an Aramaic m) are dated to 95-94 BCE, as well as 78-77 BCE.

== Roman Palestine ==
Josephus says Gaza was rebuilt by consul Aulus Gabinius after it was incorporated into the Roman Empire in 63 BCE, under the command of Pompey Magnus. It was the southernmost city of Roman Syria and Palestine and bordered to the east and south by Arabs not ruled by the empire. Roman rule brought six centuries of relative peace and prosperity to the city - resuming its role as a locus of trade between the Middle East and Africa. Gaza had two major ports; one at Maiuma and the other at Anthedon. Ard-al-Moharbeen necropolis, a cemetery with remains dating between the 1st and 3rd centuries CE discovered in 2022, is thought to have served as the burial place for the latter's inhabitants.

=== Herod; First Roman-Jewish war ===
Gaza was granted to Herod the Great by Roman emperor Augustus in 30 BCE, where it formed a separate unit within his kingdom; and Cosgabar, the governor of Idumea, was in charge of the city's affairs. On the division of Herod's kingdom, it was placed under the proconsul of Syria. After Herod's death in 4 BCE, Augustus annexed it to the province of Syria. In 66 CE, Gaza was burned down by Jews during their rebellion against the Romans. However, it remained an important city; even more so after the destruction of Jerusalem by Titus the following year. Titus passed through Gaza on his march toward to Jerusalem, and again in his return. Following Jerusalem's fall, captives were sold into slavery in Gaza. The establishment of the Roman province of Arabia Petraea in 106 CE restored trade links with Petra and Aila.

=== In the New Testament: Acts ===
In the Acts of the Apostles, Gaza is mentioned as being on the desert route from Jerusalem to Ethiopia. The Christian gospel was explained to an Ethiopian eunuch along this road by Philip the Evangelist, and he was baptised in some nearby water.

=== Culture and administration ===
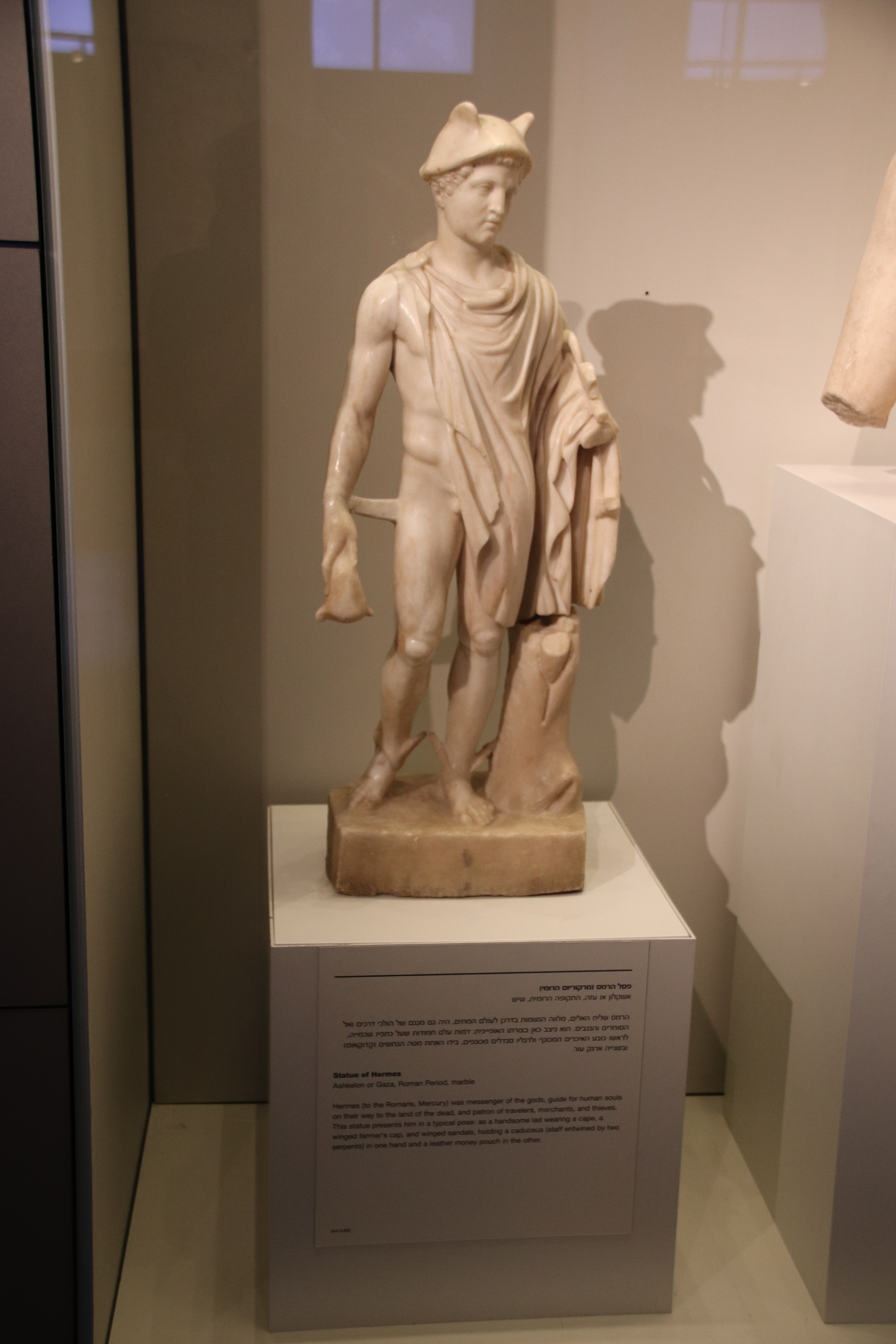
Roman period marble statue of Hermes, from Ashkelon or Gaza, held by the Israel Museum

Throughout the Roman period, Gaza was a prosperous city and received grants and attention from several emperors. It was governed by a diverse 500-member senate. Gaza's mint stamped out coins adorned with the busts of gods and emperors, including Gordian III. During his visit in 130 CE, Emperor Hadrian, who favored Gaza, personally inaugurated wrestling, boxing and oratorical competitions in Gaza's new stadium. The city was adorned with many pagan temples, the main cult being that of Marnas. Other temples were dedicated to Zeus, Helios, Aphrodite, Apollo, Athena, and Tyche. With the suppression of the Bar Kokhba revolt (132–136 CE), Jewish captives were sold as slaves in Gaza.

Gaza was awarded the status of a Roman colony at some point after the reign of Gordian III, possibly under Valerian or Gallienus.

=== Christianisation in Late Roman-Byzantine transition; Gaza and Maiuma ===
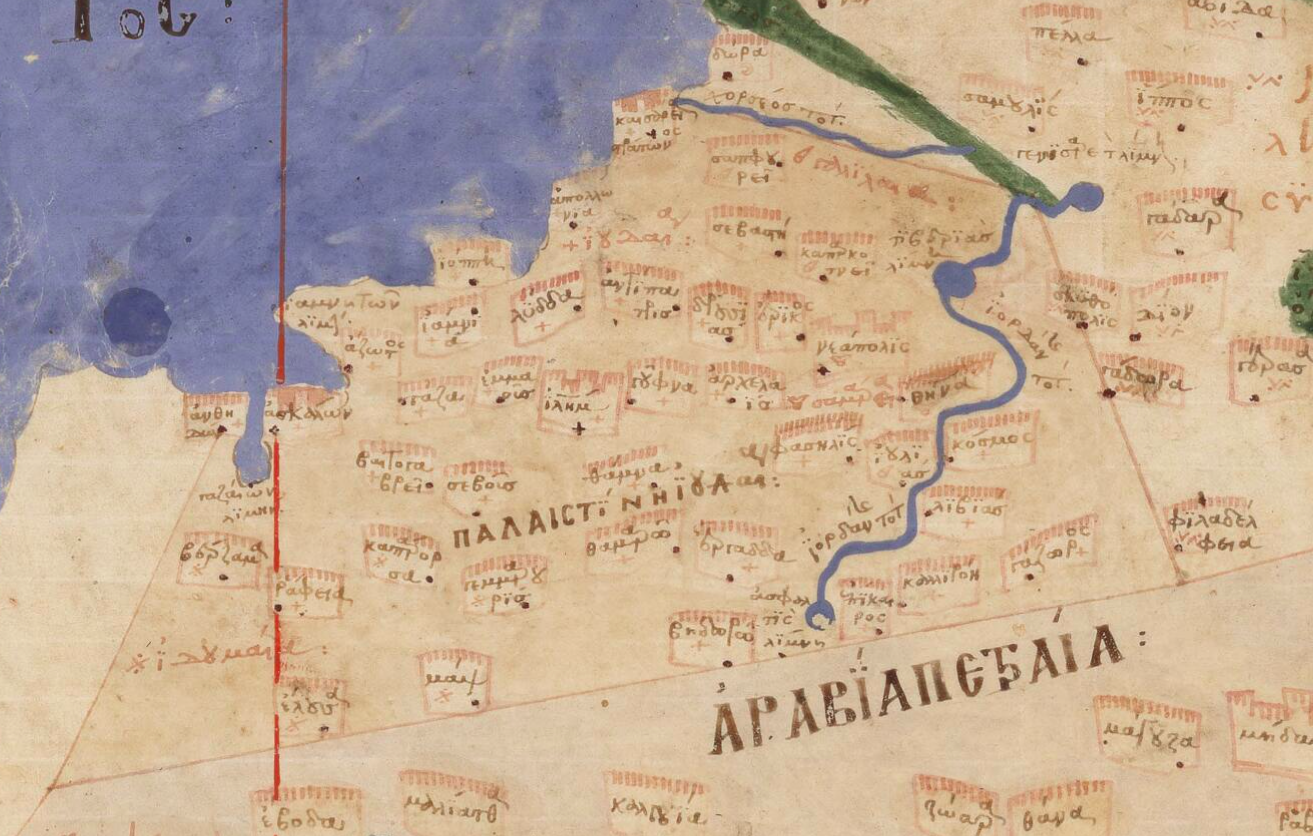
A Byzantine Greek copy of Ptolemy's map of Palestine composed c. 1300. The red line runs through the name of Ascalon and below it a little to the left is Gaza(ion).

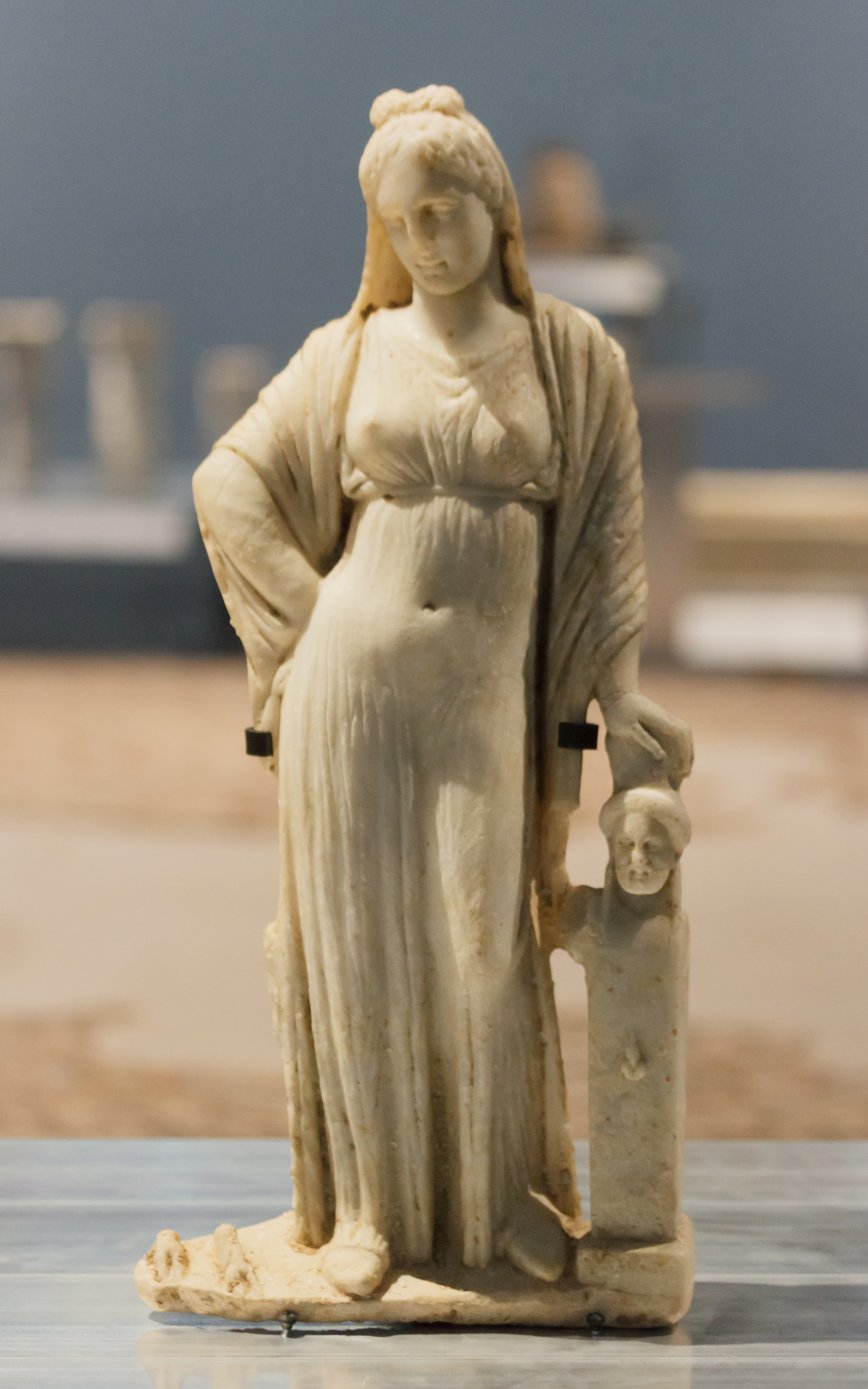
Sculpture of Aphrodite or Hecate found in the Blakhiya Byzantine cemetery near the Hellenistic-Roman era port of Anthedon (exhibited in Saved Treasures of Gaza: 5000 Years of History in 2025)

The spread of Christianity in Gaza was initiated by Philip the Arab around 250 CE; first in the port of Maiuma, but later into the city. The religion faced obstacles as it spread through the inland population because pagan worship was strong.

In 299, an unverified number of local Christians who assembled in Gaza to hear the Christian scriptures read were seized and mutilated by the Romans. Also, its Christians were harshly repressed during the Diocletianic Persecution in 303. The first bishop of Gaza was Philemon, believed to have been one of the 72 disciples, but the first cleric was Saint Silvanus who, during the persecution by Maximinus Daia in 310, was arrested along with about 30 other Christians, and condemned to death.

With reorganization of the Roman provinces under Diocletian, Gaza became part of Palaestina Prima, one of the Late Roman provinces. The official recognition of Christianity by Constantine I did not increase sympathy of the religion in Gaza. Although Gaza was represented by Bishop Asclepas in the First Council of Nicaea in 325, the vast majority of its inhabitants continued to worship the native gods. As the Roman Empire was crumbling at this time, Gaza remained unaffected. Hilarion, the Christian anchorite who had withdrawn to the Sinai desert for some 22 years, returned to the area of Gaza around this time, and the monastery in his name was founded in Deir al-Balah in 340.

At this time, the inhabitants of Maiuma reportedly converted to Christianity en masse. Constantine II decided to separate it from pagan Gaza in 331, giving Maiuma city rights and its own episcopal see independent of the diocese of Gaza. Julian reversed the process during his reign in the latter half of the 4th century. Although Maiuma had its own bishop, clergy, and diocesan territory, it shared its magistrates and administration with Gaza. Upon Julian's death, Maiuma's independence was restored and the rivalry between it and Gaza intensified.

== Byzantine period ==
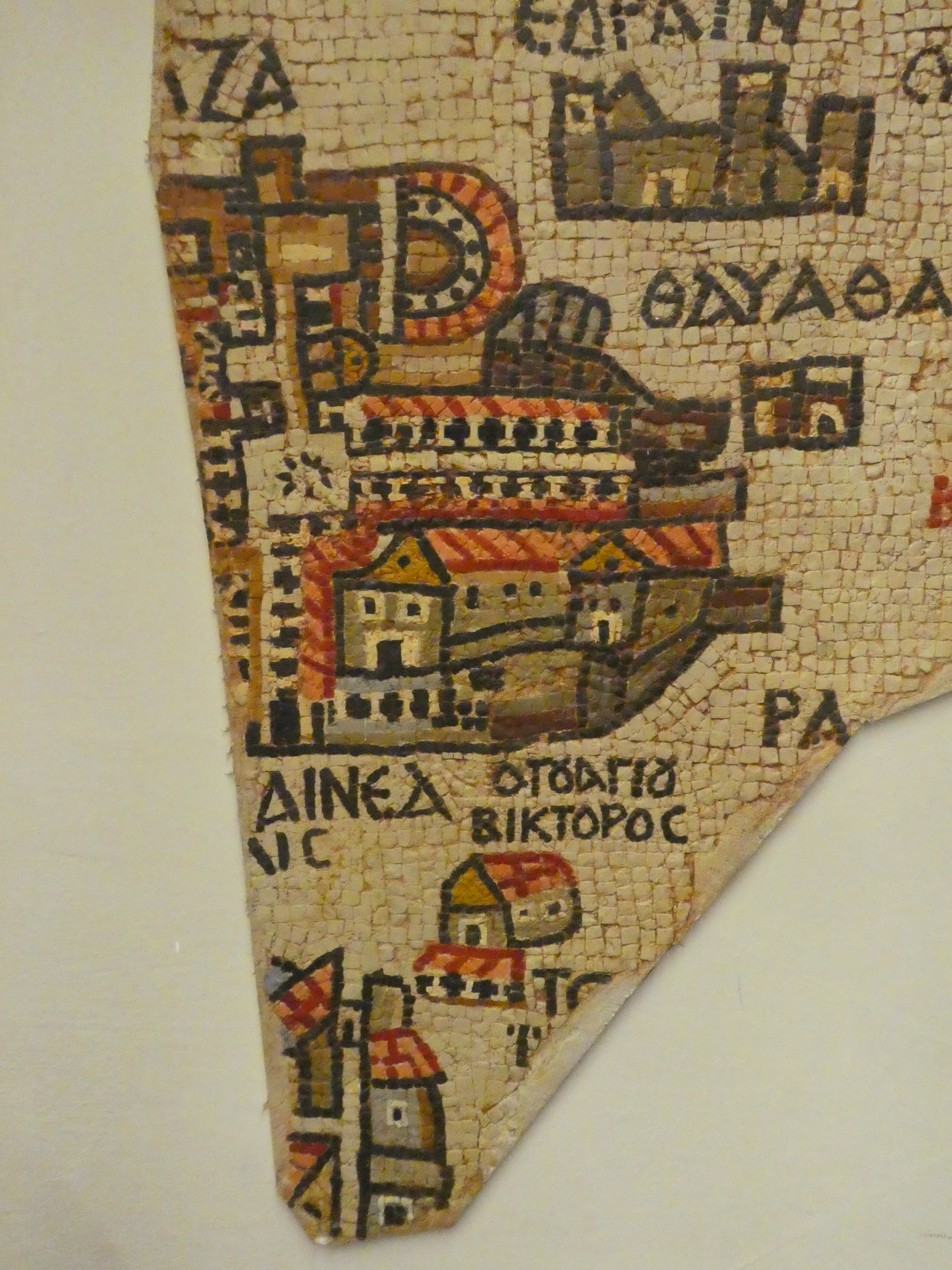
Gaza is depicted in the 6th-century Madaba Map, a mosaic discovered in Madaba, Jordan.

Under Byzantine rule, Egypt and Syria (including Palestine) were the greatest agricultural and industrial provinces, and Gaza (along with Antioch, Alexandria and Beirut) was one of its most important ports. Gaza's importance is reflected in its depiction on the 6th-century mosaic map known as the Madaba Map.

Gaza's northern municipal border in this era was marked by Wadi al-Hesi, just before Ascalon, and its southern boundary is unknown, but Gaza's jurisdiction did not reach Raphia. The towns of Bethelea, Asalea, Gerarit and Kissufim were included in Gaza's territories. Its large representation, approximately half of which is preserved, has yet to be fully documented and studied, mainly because only small tentative excavations have been made there and because (until the 2023 Gaza war) ancient Gaza was covered by the still-inhabited Old City. The discovery of the Blakhiya Byzantine cemetery in Gaza's Beach camp thought to be associated with the port of Anthedon, came during construction works there in 1995. Other Byzantine era sites discovered lie outside the modern boundaries of the city and include the Byzantine Church of Jabalia and Tell Umm Amer in Nuseirat.

Provinces in Byzantine Empire were reorganized and clustered into regional groups called dioceses in the late 4th century; thus, the province of Syria Palaestina and neighboring regions were organized into the provinces Palaestina Prima, Palaestina Secunda, and Palaestina Tertia (First, Second, and Third Palestine). Gaza was made part of Palaestina Prima, its provincial capital in Caesarea Maritima, encompassing the central parts of Palestine, including the coastal plain, Judea, and Samaria.

=== Institutionalization of Christianity ===
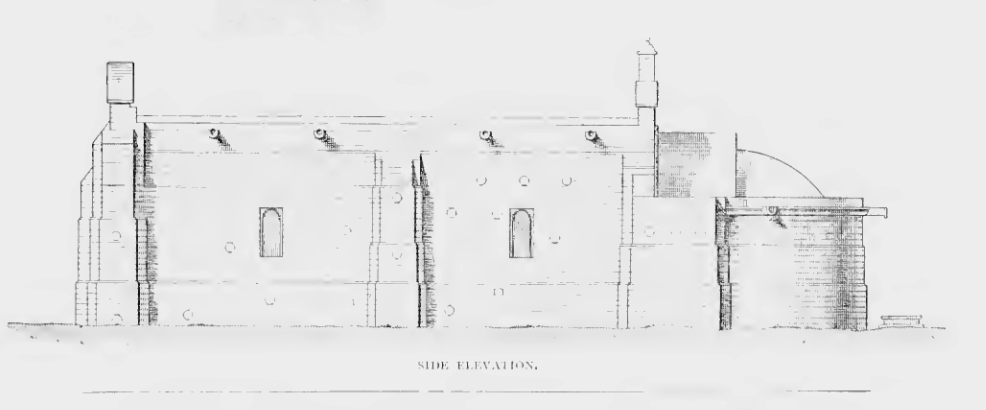
1896 sketch by Charles Simon Clermont-Ganneau of the Church of Saint Porphyrius

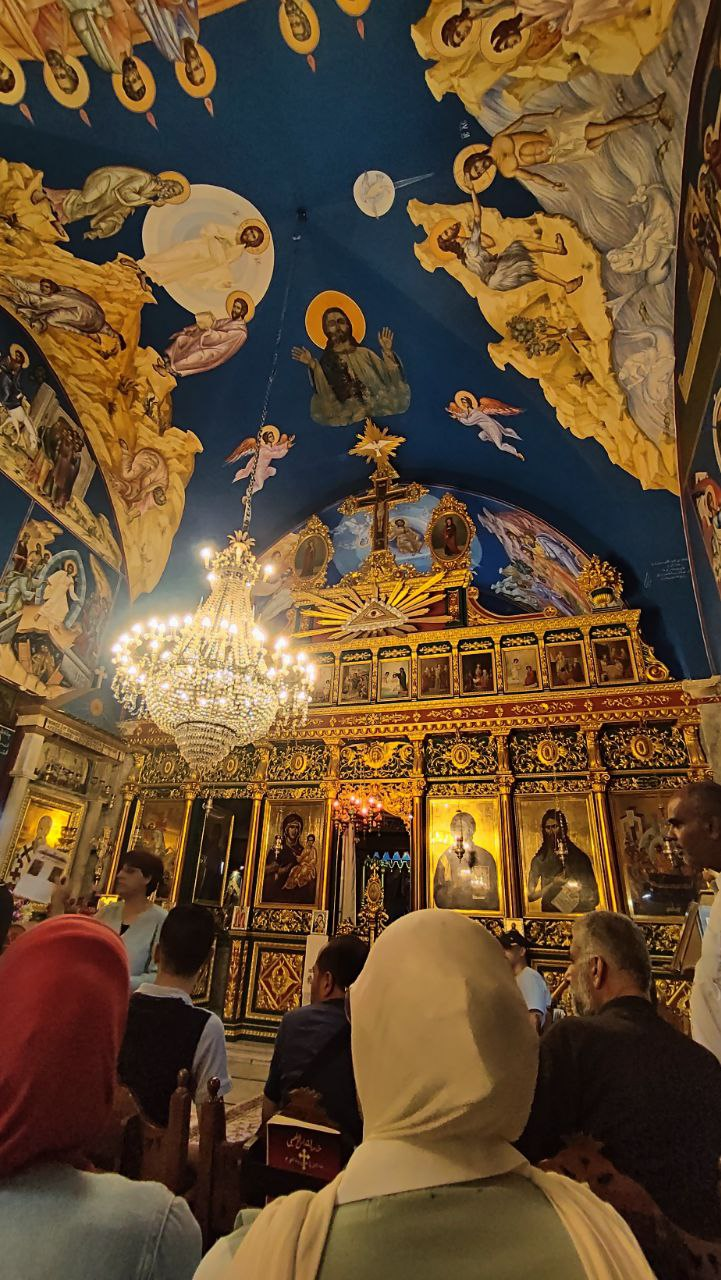
Interior of Church of Saint Porphyrius (2023–2025)

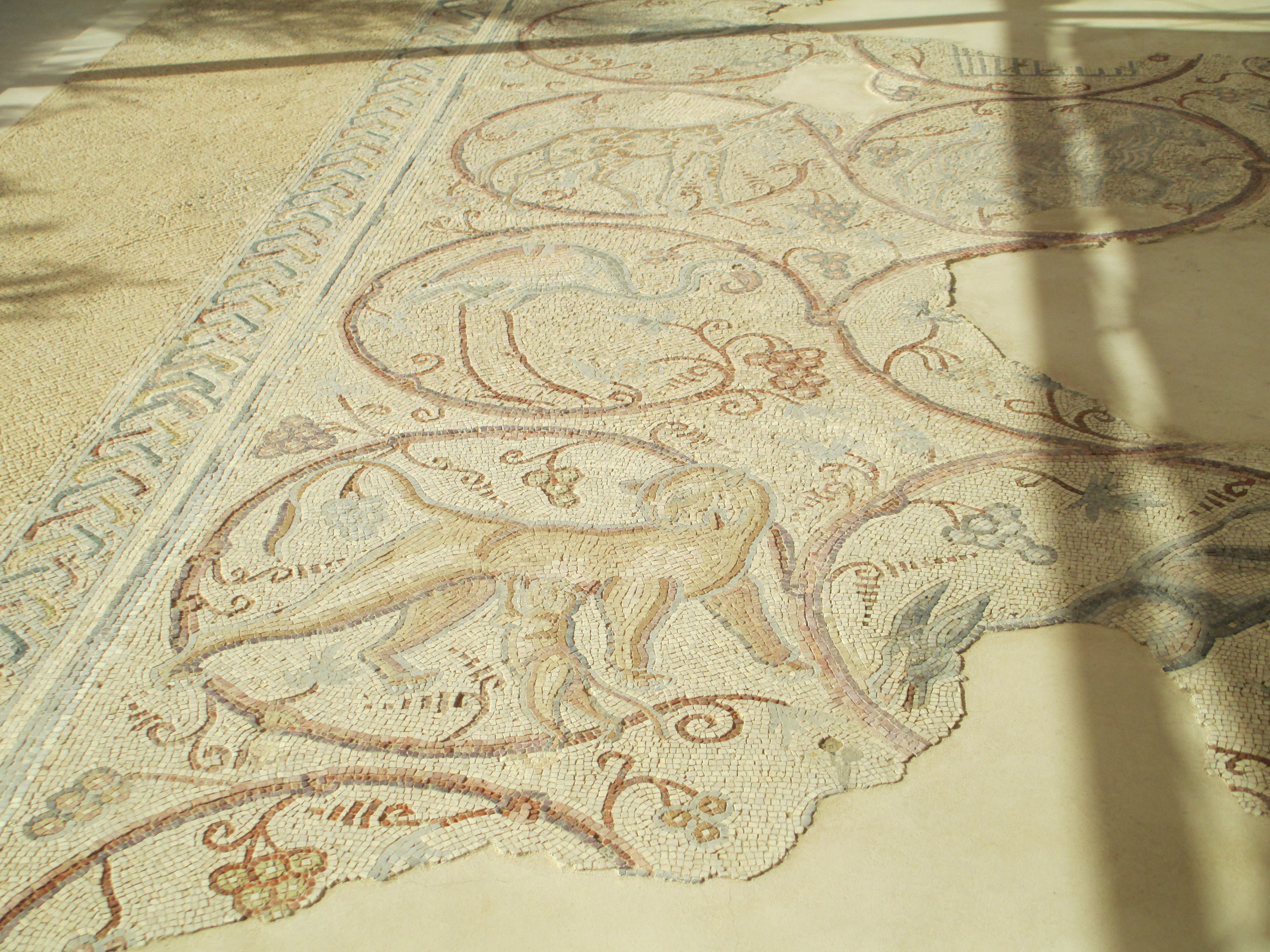
Section of mosaic floor from the Gaza synagogue on display at the Good Samaritan Museum

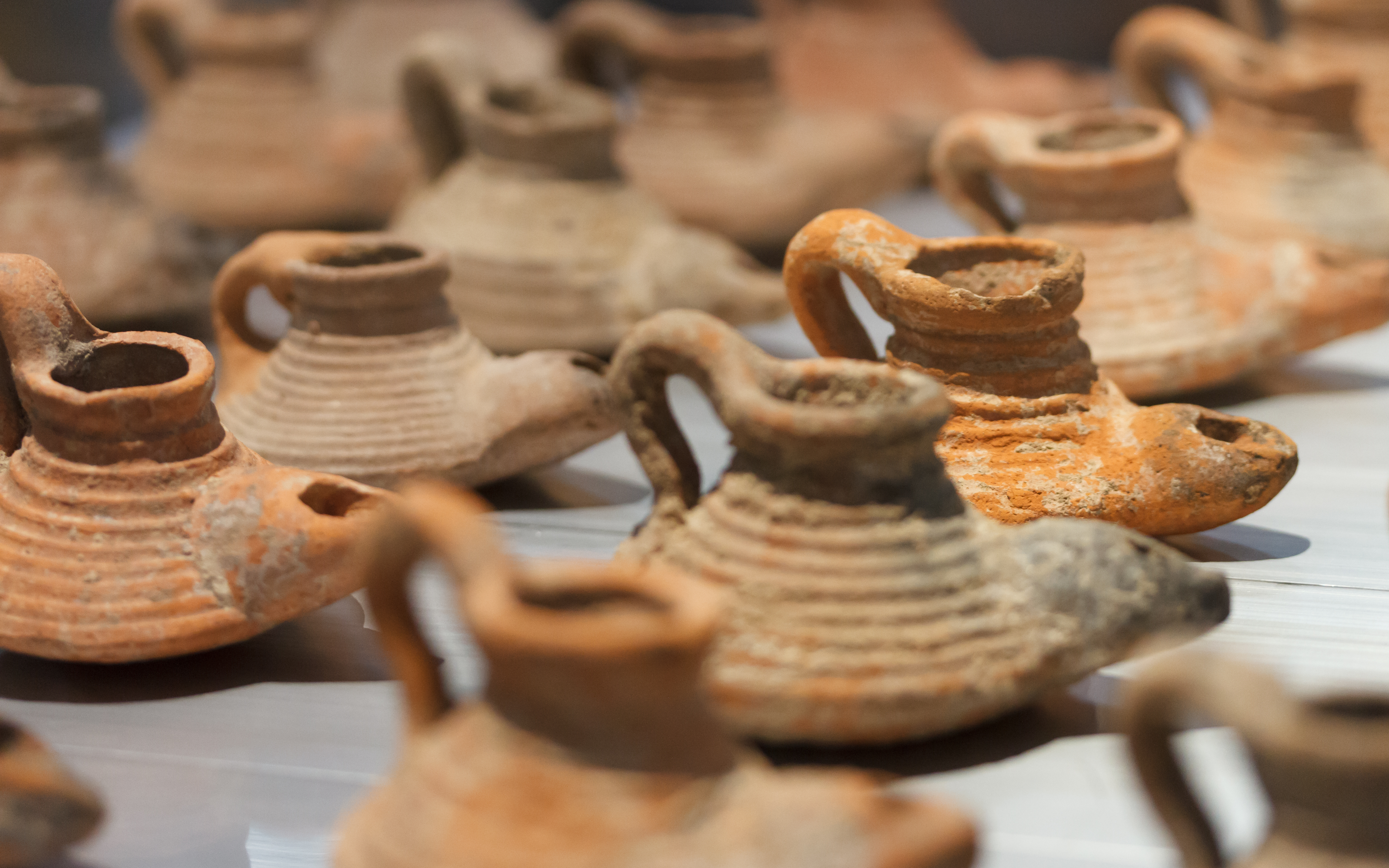
A selection of 6th-century lamps discovered during excavations in Gaza City

During most of the 4th century, the Christian community was small, poor, and carried no influence in the city. The church was insignificant and its members were not allowed to hold political office. During the rule of Julian the Apostate, there was violent persecution and early Christian martyrs include Eusebius, Nestablus, Zeno, and Nestor. Conversion to Christianity in Gaza was spearheaded under Saint Porphyrius between 396 and 420.

The main source for pagan–Christian tensions in Gaza at this time is Porphyrius' biographer, Mark the Deacon. In 402, after obtaining a decree from the emperor Arcadius, all eight of the city's pagan temples were destroyed and non-Christian worship was forbidden by the envoy Cynegius, replacing persecution of the Christians with persecution of pagans in the late Roman Empire. Paganism continued despite persecution, and according to the traditional Christian history, Christians were still persecuted in the city, resulting in Porphyrius undertaking more measures.

As a result of his persuasion, Empress Aelia Eudocia commissioned the construction of a church atop the ruins of the temple of Marnas in 406. Note that according to MacMullen, it is likely that Porphyrius did not even exist. According to traditional Christian history, persecution against Christians did not cease, but it was less harsh and frequent than previously.

While Christianity became the religion of the empire, the discovery of a large 6th-century synagogue with a mosaic tile floor depicting King David indicates it was not hostile to Judaism. An inscription states that the floor was donated in 508–509 CE by two merchant brothers.

=== Christian golden era ===
Around 540, Gaza became the starting point for pilgrimages to the Sinai Peninsula. It was an important city in the early Christian world and many scholars taught at its famous rhetorical school, including Procopius of Gaza or the ecclesiastic historian Zacharias Rhetor. The celebrated Church of Saint Sergius was built in this century among other building projects such as a bath house, stoas and the city wall, that were undertaken by the bishop Marcianus and the provincial governor Stephanus.

At the same time, the region around Gaza became an important monastic center, with Barsanuphius and Dorotheus of Gaza following the earlier example of Hilarion of Gaza, and these greatly influenced Byzantine and Slavic monasticism.

=== Economy; wine and textile production ===
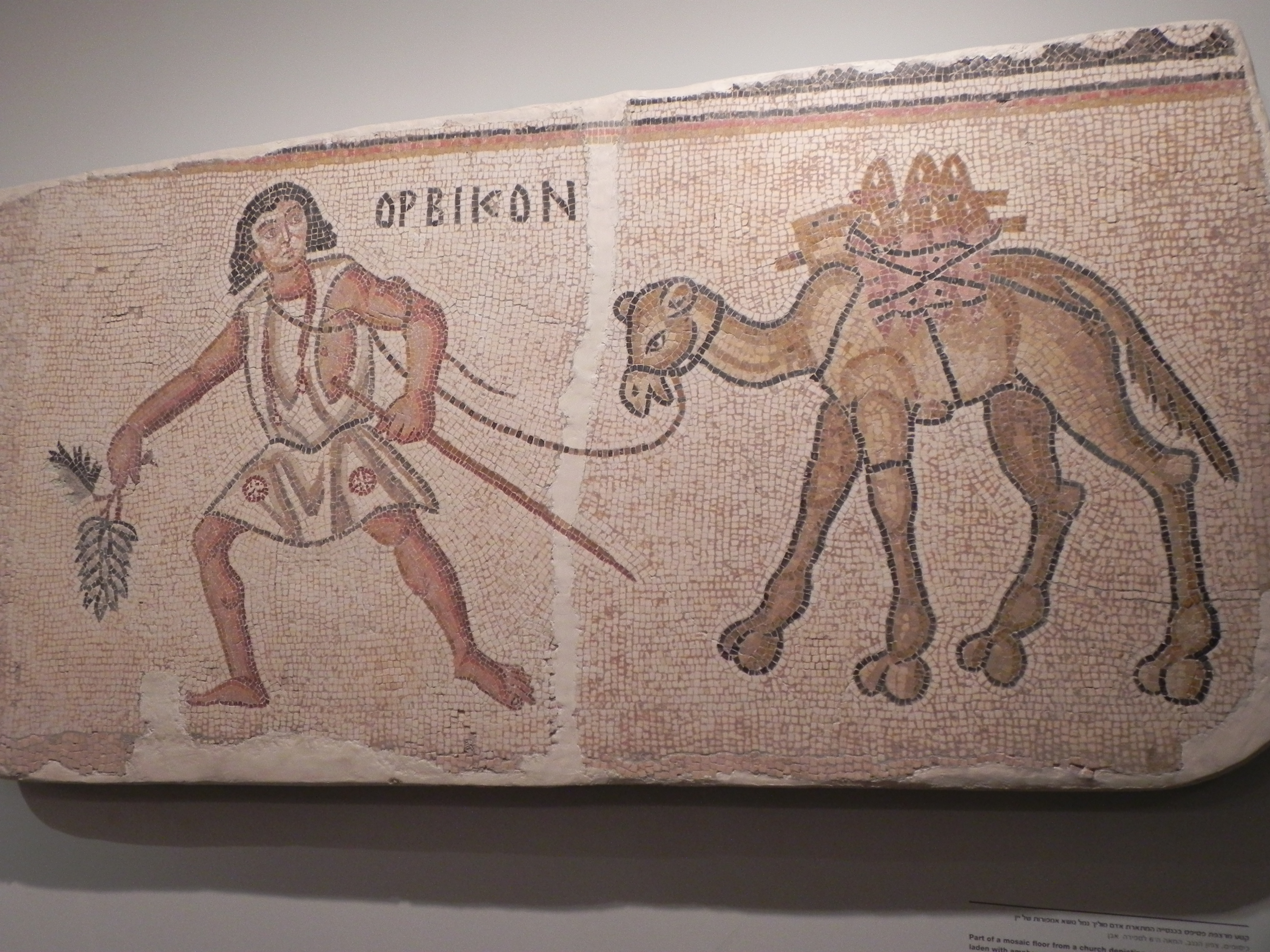
Camel carrying Gaza jars as depicted in a Byzantine era mosaic floor, displayed near Kissufim, northwest Negev (Israel Museum)

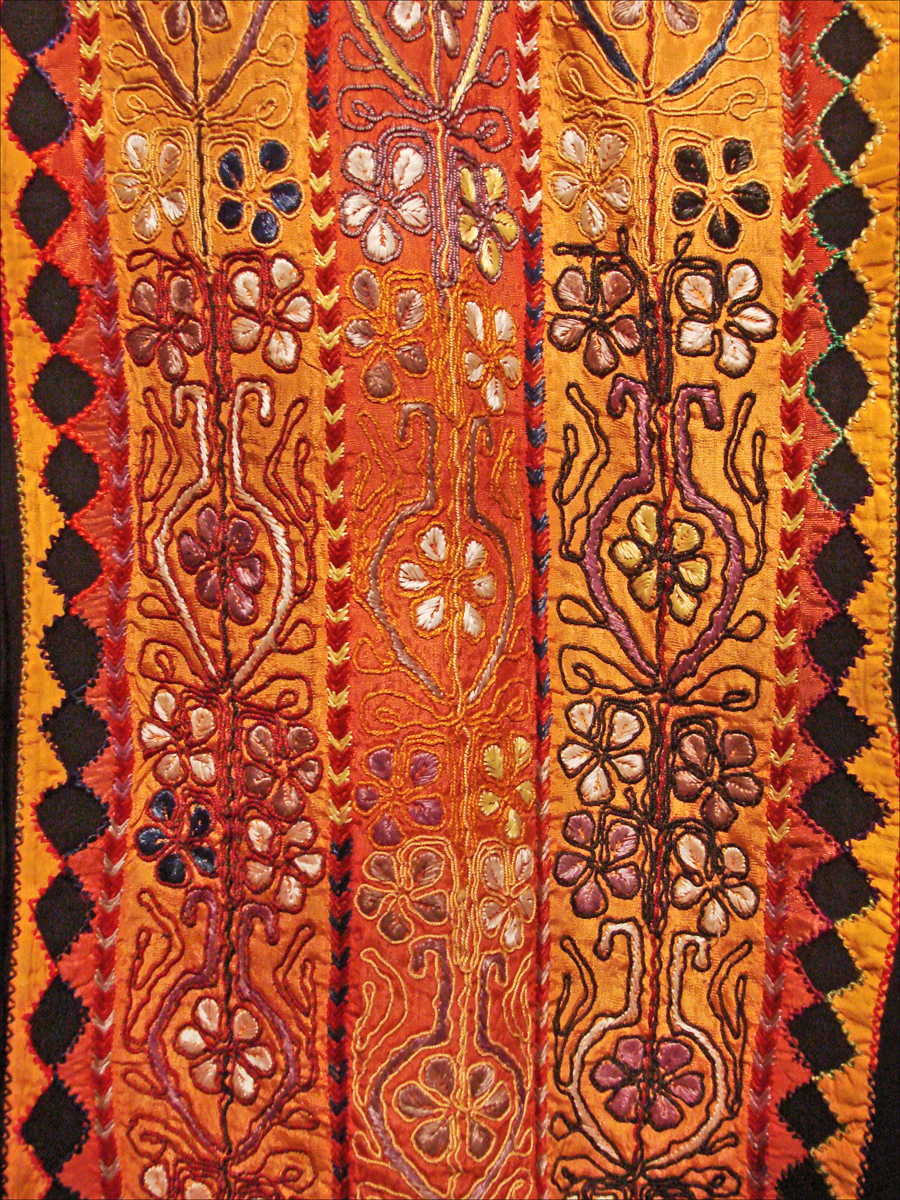
Jellayé style embroidery of Mesmiya, Gaza. Silk thread on cotton fabric from 1920

The depiction on the 6th-century Madaba Map supports the notion that Gaza was the most important political and commercial centre on the southern coast of Palestine. It was one of two terminus points for the Via Odorifera (Perfume or Incense route) within Byzantium, the other being Bostra, and the only one with a port from which goods could be sent out into the Mediterranean to other cities in the Empire. Gaza's port continued to serve as a key maritime node in this period. Timotheus of Gaza reports having seen two giraffes and an elephant, which were transiting through Gaza from Alya on their way to Emperor Anastasius I Dicorus.

One of the goods the city exported between the fourth and seventh century was Gaza wine, grown around the city as far as Yibna, also cultivated by some of the monasteries. Known as gazetum, it was exported around all the Mediterranean in locally produced amphorae identified by archaeologists as the Gaza jar, is and mentioned by writers such as Jerome, Sidonius Apollinaris from Gaul and Isidore of Seville.

Gaza was also one of a handful of cities along the eastern Mediterranean coast that was a center for fine silk weaving, producing "excellent silk textiles", a craft that continued long after Byzantium imperial rule came to an end. Silk production until 542, when sericulture began in the Oriens (Greater Syria), depended on raw silk imports from Persia, along the Silk Road that passed through Mesopotamia, and this was the work of the Ghassanid foederati, who would surely have had a presence in Gaza securing the route to the Gaza port too at this time.

== Early Muslim period ==
=== Rashidun period ===
There were already converts to Islam among the city's Greek-speaking Christian population before Gaza's capitulation to the Muslims. Near the end of the Byzantine era, Gaza had become the home of an increasingly influential group of Arab traders from Mecca, including Umar ibn al-Khattab, who later became the second ruler of the Islamic Caliphate. Muhammad visited the city more than once before being a prophet of Islam.

In 634, Gaza was besieged by the Rashidun army under general 'Amr ibn al-'As, with assistance from Khalid ibn al-Walid, following the Battle of Ajnadayn between the Byzantine Empire and the Rashidun Caliphate in central Palestine. The Muslims' victory at Ajnadayn gave them control over much of Palestine's countryside, but not the major cities with garrisons such as Gaza. With Umar succeeding Abu Bakr as caliph (head of the Caliphate), the Rashidun forces began to make stronger efforts at conquering Byzantine territory. During the three-year siege of Gaza, the city's Jewish community fought alongside the Byzantine garrison. In the summer of 637, Amr's forces broke the siege and captured Gaza, killing its Byzantine garrison, but not attacking its inhabitants. Amr's victory is attributed to a combination of Arab strategy, Byzantine weakness, and the influence of Gaza's Arab residents. Believed to be the site where Muhammad's great-grandfather Hashim ibn Abd Manaf—who also lived as a merchant in Gaza—was buried, the city was not destroyed by the victorious Arab army.

==== Islamisation ====
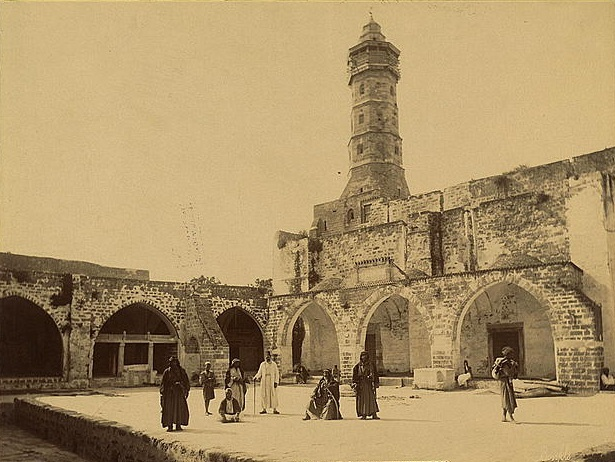
Courtyard, arcades and minaret of the Great Mosque, late 19th century

The arrival of the Muslim Arabs brought great changes to Gaza's religious and urban landscape; its churches were transformed into mosques, including the Cathedral of John the Baptist (previously the Temple of Marnas), which became the Great Mosque of Gaza. Gaza's population adopted Islam as their religion relatively quickly in contrast with the city's countryside. Eventually, Arabic became the official language. The Christian population was reduced to an insignificant minority and the Samaritan residents deposited their property with their high priest and fled the city east upon the Muslim conquest.

=== Administrative district ===
Gaza was placed under the administration of Jund Filastin ("District of Palestine") of Bilad al-Sham province during Rashidun rule, and continued to be part of the district under the successive caliphates of the Umayyads and Abbasids.

=== Umayyad period ===
Under the Umayyads Gaza served as a minor administrative center. In 672 an earthquake struck the city but there are few details of its effects. Under the caliph-appointed governors, Christians and Jews were taxed, though their worship and trade continued, as noted in the writings of bishop Willibald, who visited the city in 723. Nevertheless, exports of wine and olives declined and the overall prosperity of Palestine and Gaza went down.

=== Abbasid period ===
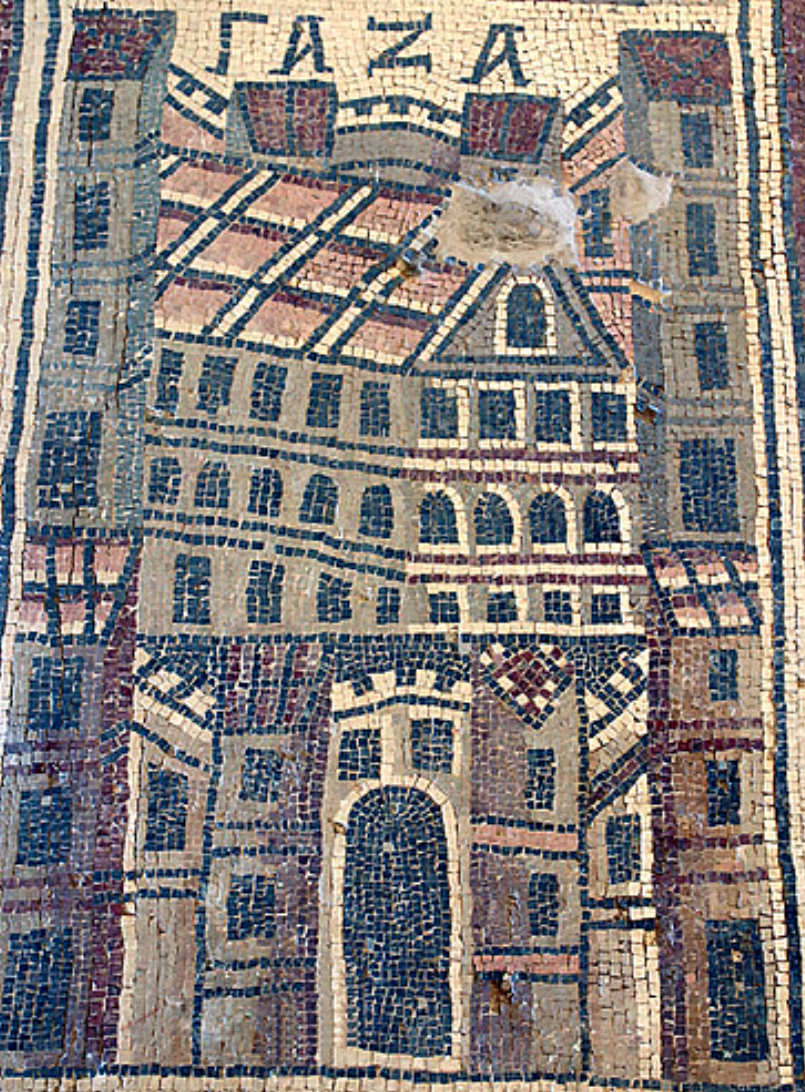
Depiction of a Gaza building in the Byzantine Umm ar-Rasas mosaics, c. 8th century, during the Abbasid Caliphate

The year 750 saw the end of Umayyad rule in Palestine and the arrival of the Abbasids, with Gaza becoming a center for the writing of Islamic law. In 767, Muhammad ibn Idris ash-Shafi'i was born in Gaza and lived his early childhood there; al-Shafi'i founded one of the prominent fiqhs (schools of law) of Sunni Islam, named Shafi'i after him.

In 796 the city was laid waste during a civil war by the Arab tribes of the area. Gaza apparently recovered by the 9th century according to Persian geographer Istakhri who wrote that merchants grew rich there "for this place was a great market for the people of the Hejaz." A Christian writer, writing in 867, described it as "rich in all things". Gaza's port, however, occasionally succumbed to neglect under Arab rule and an overall decline in commerce followed because of infighting among Palestine's rulers and Bedouin bandits who disrupted overland trade routes towards the city.

=== Tulunids and Fatimids ===
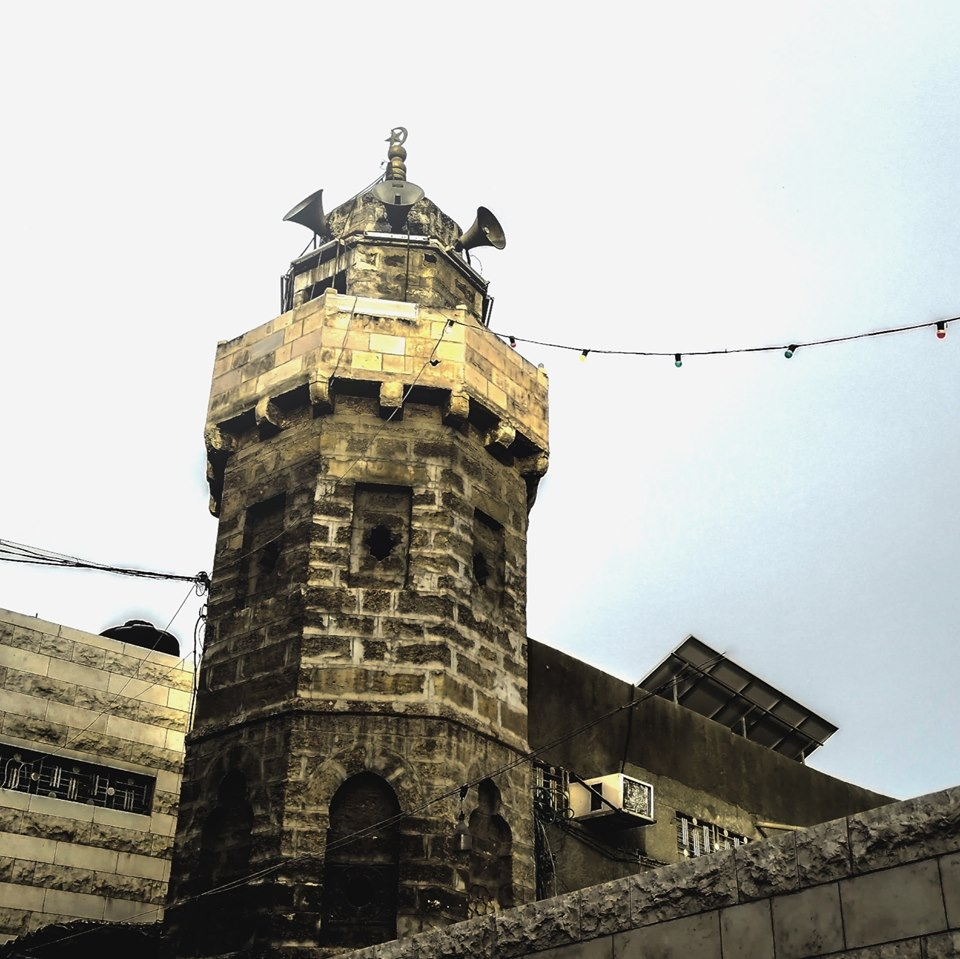
Ibn Marwan Mosque in Gaza's Tuffah neighborhood. Renovated in the early 14th century, date of initial construction unknown

From 868 to 905 the Tulunids ruled Gaza, and around 909, the influence of the Fatimids from Egypt started to grow, leading to a slow decline of the city. The orange was introduced to the area, arriving from India in 943. In 977, the Fatimids established an agreement with the Seljuk Turks, whereby the Fatimids would control Gaza and the land south of it, including Egypt.

By the 985 CE, while under Fatimid rule, the Arab geographer al-Muqaddasi described Gaza as "a large town lying on the highroad to Egypt on the border of the desert. There is here a beautiful mosque, also to be seen is the monument for the Khalif Umar." Al-Maqdisi also shares an anecdote about the watch-towers (ribat) at the various ports of Palestine, including Gaza, where he recounts that Greek galley ships would dock carrying Muslim captives who would be ransomed at a price of 3 for 100 dinars. People would rush down to the coast upon their arrival to contribute what they could, throwing down jewelry of all kinds, until the ransoms of all captives were paid to free them.

The Arabic-language poet Sulayman al-Ghazzi, who later also became bishop of the city, wrote many poems that thematise the hardships Palestinian Christians suffered during the reign of caliph al-Hakim. Another poet, Abu Ishaq Ibrahim al-Ghazzi, was born in the city in 1049.

== Crusader/Ayyubid period ==
The Crusaders wrested control of Gaza from the Fatimids in 1100. According to the chronicler William of Tyre, the Crusaders found it uninhabited and in ruins. Unable to totally refortify the hilltop on which Gaza was built, due to a lack of resources, King Baldwin III built a small castle there in 1149. The possession of Gaza completed the military encirclement of the Fatimid-held city of Ascalon to the north. After the castle's construction, Baldwin granted it and the surrounding region to the Knights Templar. He also had the Great Mosque converted into the Cathedral of Saint John.

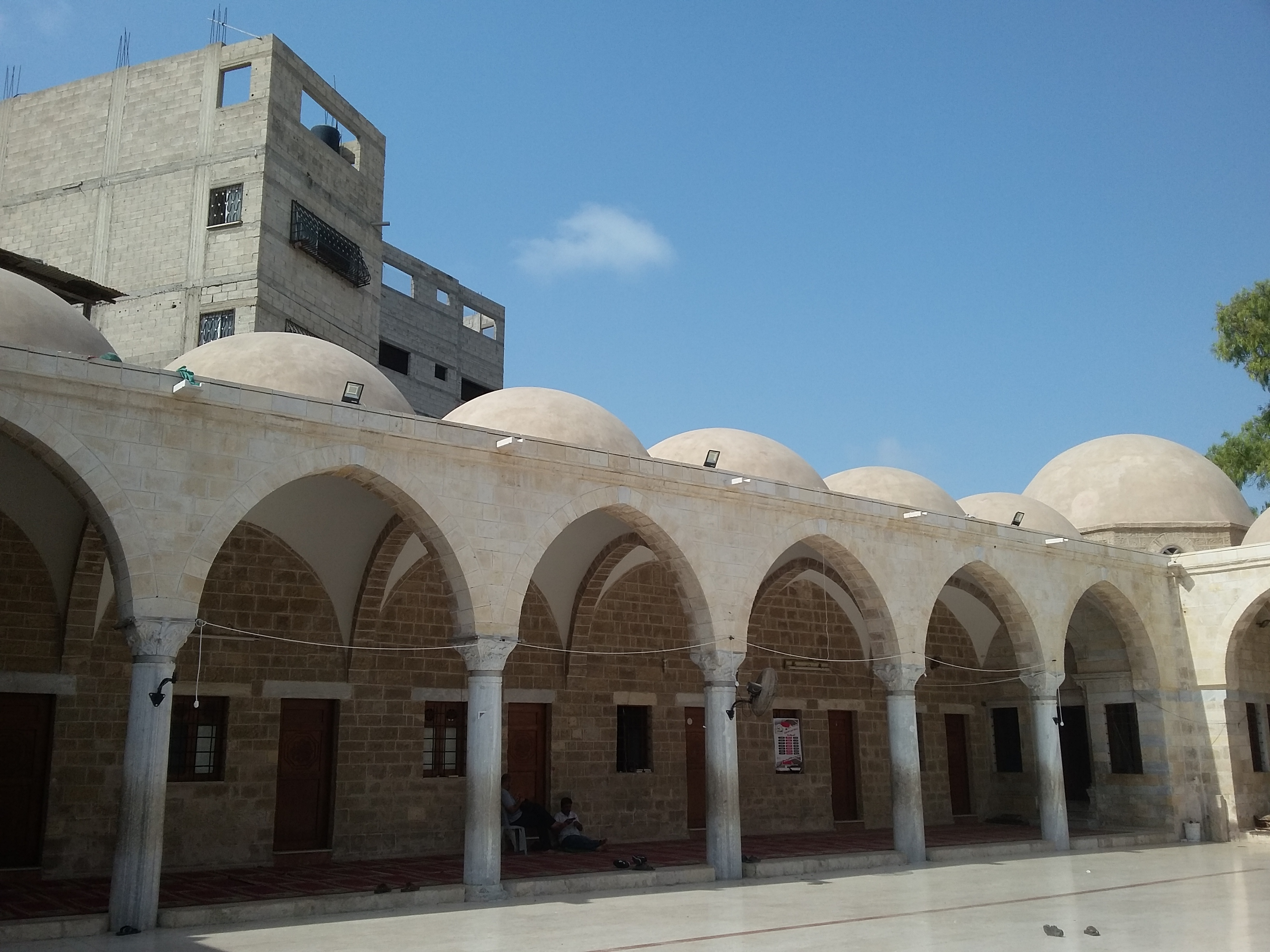
Sayyed Al-Hashim Mosque in Gaza's Old City. First mosque and madrasa in this name were built at this same site in the 12th century, though this structure dated to the 19th century. Destroyed in Israeli bombardment during the Israeli genocide on Gaza.

In 1154, the Arab traveler al-Idrisi wrote Gaza "is today very populous and in the hands of the Crusaders." William of Tyre confirms that in 1170, a civilian population was persuaded to occupy the area outside the castle and establish feeble fortifications and gates surrounding the community. That same year, King Amalric I of Jerusalem withdrew Gaza's Templars to assist him against an Egypt-based Ayyubid force led by Saladin at nearby Darum. However, Saladin evaded the Crusader force and assaulted Gaza instead, destroying the town built outside the castle's walls and killing its inhabitants after they were refused refuge in the castle, managed by Miles of Plancy at the time. Seven years later, the Templars prepared for another defense of Gaza against Saladin, but this time his forces fell on Ascalon. In 1187, following Ascalon's capitulation, the Templars surrendered Gaza in return for the release of their master Gerard of Ridefort. Saladin then ordered the destruction of the city's fortifications in 1191. A year later, after recapturing it, Richard the Lionheart apparently refortified the city, but the walls were dismantled as a result of the Treaty of Ramla agreed upon months later in 1193.

According to geographer Abu al-Fida, Gaza was a medium-sized city, possessing gardens and a seashore in the early 13th century. The Ayyubids constructed the Shuja'iyya neighborhood—the first extension of Gaza beyond the Old City.

== Mamluk period ==
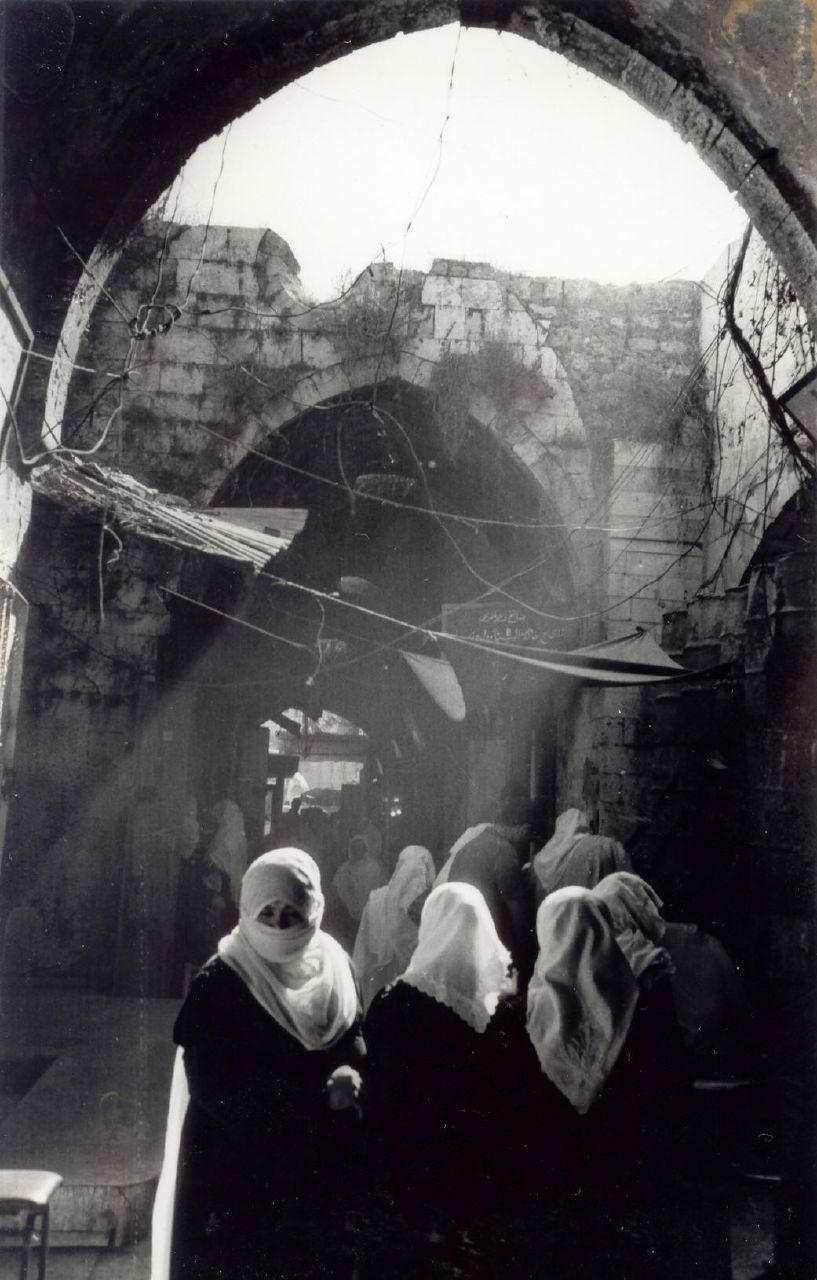
The Gold Market in Gaza dates from the Mamluk period

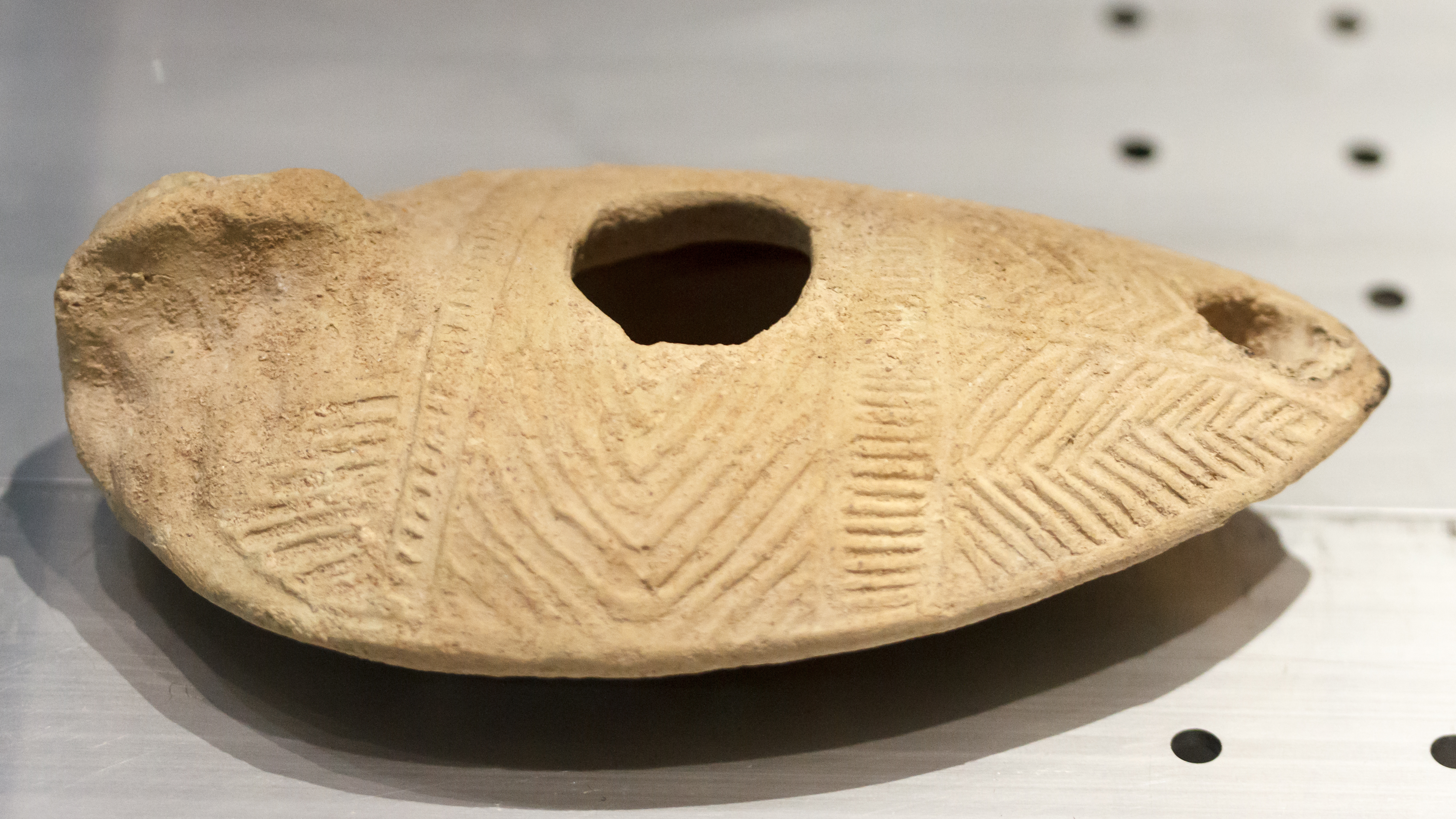
A 13th- or 14th-century slipper lamp discovered at Tell Umm el-'Amr, Nuseirat

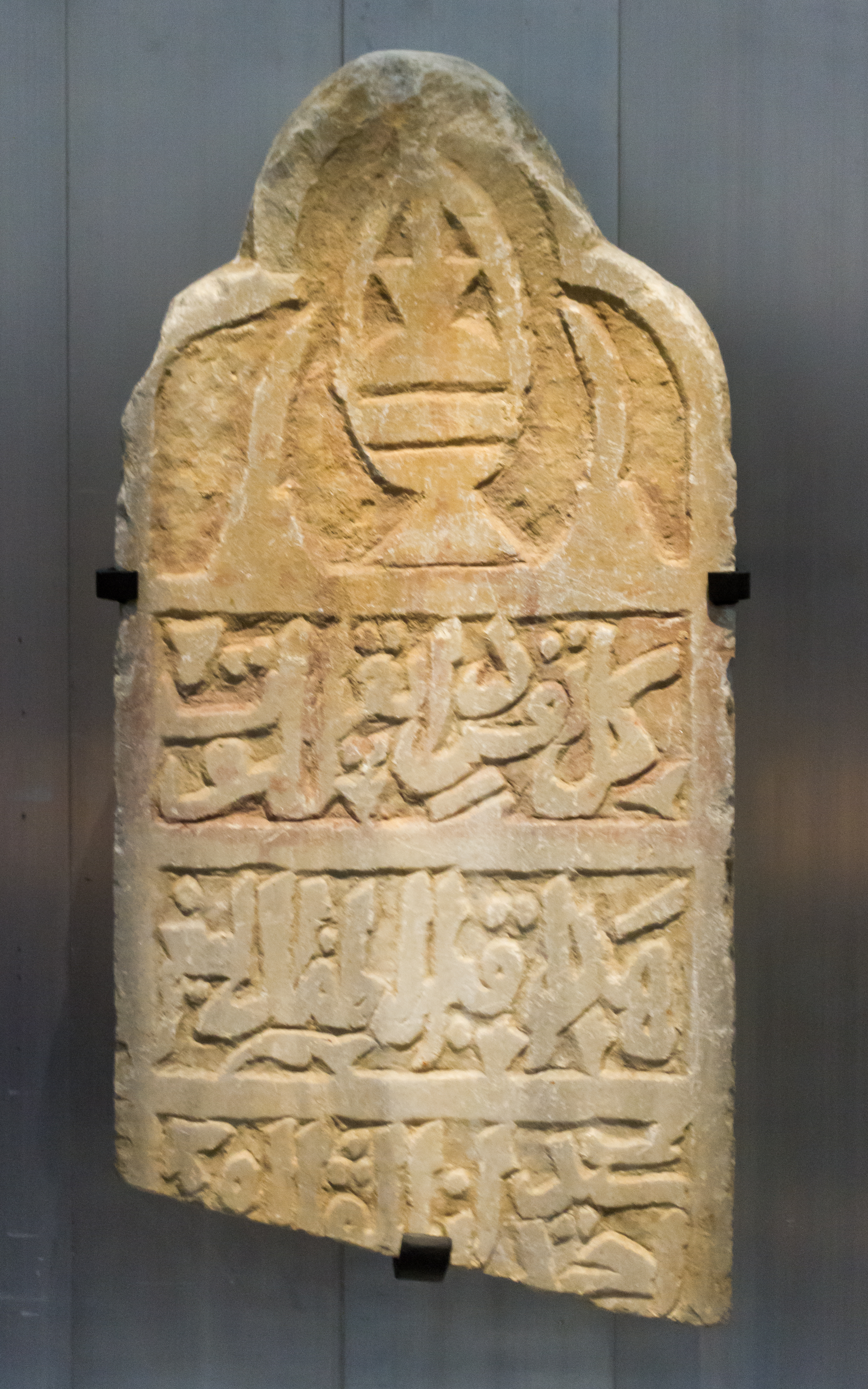
Funerary stele in Arabic script dated to 13th-16th centuries

Ayyubid rule virtually ended in 1260, after the Mongols under Hulagu Khan completely destroyed Gaza—Hulagu's southernmost point of conquest. Hulagu left his army in Gaza after being recalled due to the death of the Mongol emperor, and Mamluk general az-Zahir Baybars subsequently drove the Mongols out of the city and again defeated them at Ain Jalut in the Harod Valley near Baysan in 1260. He was proclaimed sultan of Egypt on his way back from the battlefield after the assassination of Sultan Qutuz. Baibars passed through Gaza six times during his expeditions against the remnants of the Crusader states and the Mongols between 1263 and 1269.

Mamluk domination started in 1277, with Gaza initially being a small village in the territory of Ramla. In 1279, Sultan al-Mansur Qalawun encamped in Gaza for fifty days while on a march against the Mongols.

=== Gaza Governorate (est. 1293) ===
In 1293, Qalawun's son an-Nasir Muhammad instituted Gaza as the capital of the province that bore its name, Mamlakat Ghazzah, lit. the Governorate of Gaza. This province covered the coastal plain from Rafah in the south, extending in the east to the western slopes of Samaria and the Hebron Hills; its major towns to the north were Qaqun, Ludd, and Ramla.

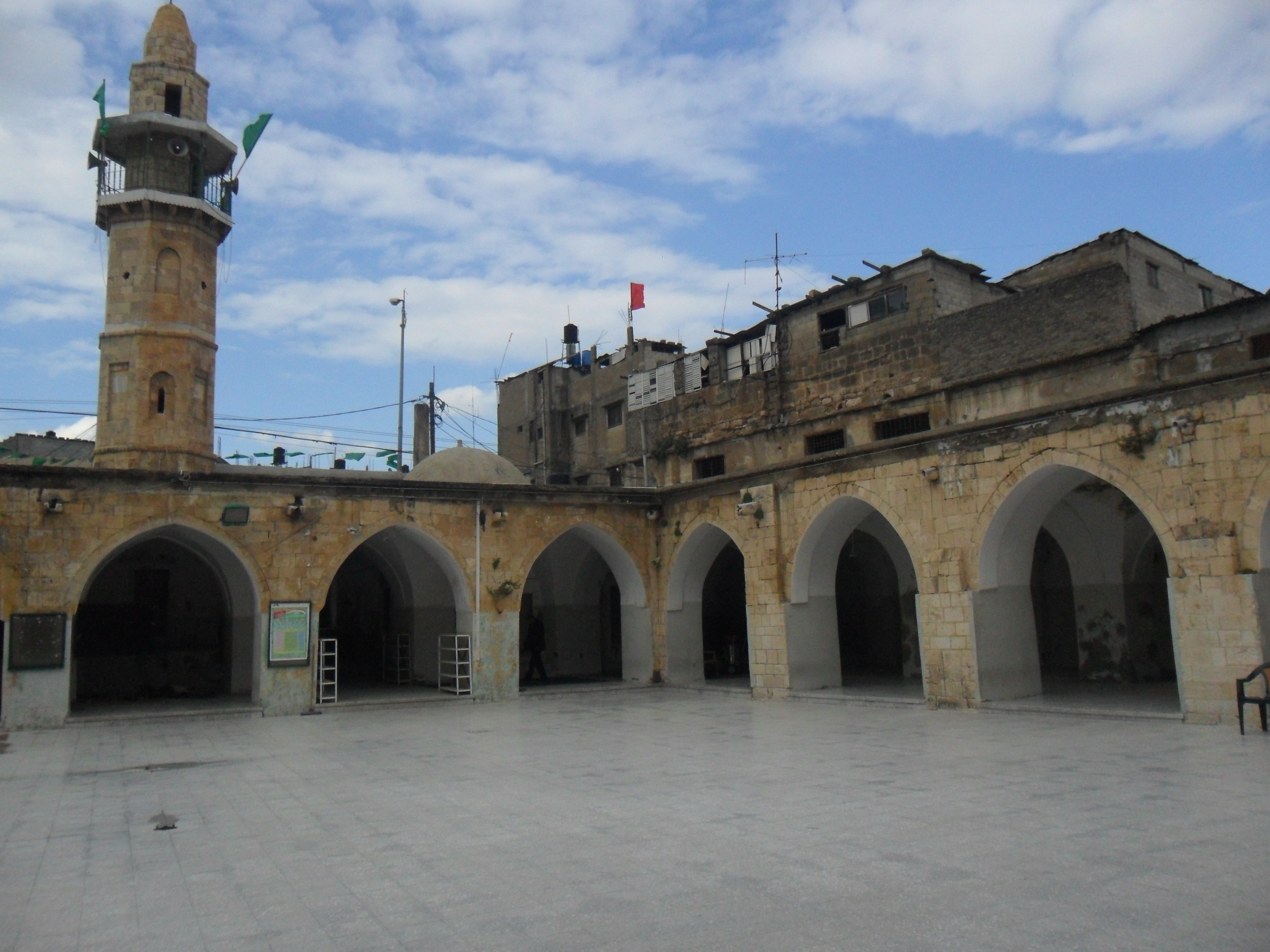
Ibn Uthman mosque, constructed in the late 14th century in Gaza's Shuja'iyya neighborhood

In 1294, an earthquake devastated Gaza, and five years later the Mongols again destroyed all that was restored by the Mamluks. That same year, Gaza was the center of a conspiracy against Sultan al-Adil Kitbugha, but the plot was detected and crushed before being carried out.

The Syrian geographer al-Dimashqi accounted to Gaza the cities and towns of Ascalon, Jaffa, Caesarea and Arsuf to the north; Deir al-Balah and al-Arish (in north-central the Sinai) to the south; Bayt Jibrin, Karatiyya, Hebron and Jerusalem to the east—all of which had their own sub-governors. He further described Gaza in 1300 as "so rich in trees it looks like a cloth of brocade spread out upon the land".

Emir Baibars al-Ala'i ruled Mamlakat Ghazzah between 1307 and 1310, during the second reign of an-Nasir Muhammad until the latter was briefly overthrown by Baybars al-Jashnakir. Gaza was one of the places that returned to the allegiance of the exiled sultan; in 1310, an-Nasir Muhammad defeated Sultan Baybars in Gaza, forcing the latter to surrender his throne to him. Baybars was imprisoned in the city.

Emir Sanjar al-Jawli acquired the governorship of Gaza and central Palestine in 1311. He highly favored Gaza and transformed it into a flourishing city, having built in it a horse-race course, a madrasa (college), a mosque, a khan (caravansary), a maristan (hospital), and a castle. In late 1332, coinciding with the appointment of Emir Taynal al-Ashrafi as governor, some of the provincial privileges of Gaza, such as the governor's direct subordination to the sultan in Cairo, were removed by an-Nasir Muhammad's decree. From then, and until 1341, when Sanjar al-Jawli served a second term as governor, Gaza became subordinate to the na'ib as-saltana (viceroy) of Syria, Emir Tankiz al-Husami.

In 1348, the bubonic plague spread to the city, killing the majority of its inhabitants, and in 1352, Gaza suffered a destructive flood—which was rare in that arid part of Palestine. However, by 1355, the Berber traveller Ibn Battuta visited the city and noted that it was "large and populous, and has many mosques. But there were no walls round it. There was here of old a fine Jami' Mosque (the Great Mosque), but the one present[ly] used was built by Amir Jawli [Sanjar al-Jawli]."

In the early 1380s, the governor of Gaza, Akbugha as-Safawi, plotted to commit treason against Sultan az-Zahir Barquq. The plot was detected, Safawi was exiled to al-Karak, and replaced by Husam al-Din ibn Bakish. Soon after, the city fell into the hands of Emir Yalbugha al-Umari who revolted against Barquq. Gaza was retaken without violence, and Ibn Bakish met Yalbugha at its gates with gifts and proposals of peace. The unseated Barquq regained his throne in 1389, and retook Gaza the next year. Barquq Castle, a fortified khan was constructed by Yunis al-Nawruzi, a dawadar of the Mamluk Circassian sultan Barquq at this time to the south of Gaza City, in Khan Yunis.

In 1401 a swarm of locusts destroyed Gaza's crops. A battle between the rival Mamluk emirs Akbirdi and Qansuwa Khamsiyah occurred in Gaza; Khamsiyah had failed in usurping the Mamluk throne and fled to Gaza where he made his unsuccessful last stand. Between 1428 and 1433, Gaza was governed by Emir Sayf ad-Din Inal, who would later become sultan in 1453. During his sultanate, in 1455, Inal's dawadar (executive secretary) had the Madrasa of Birdibak built in the Shuja'iyya neighborhood.

== Ottoman period ==
1573 map of Palestine by Abraham Ortelius showing the city of Gaza on the coast between Maionia and Anthedon

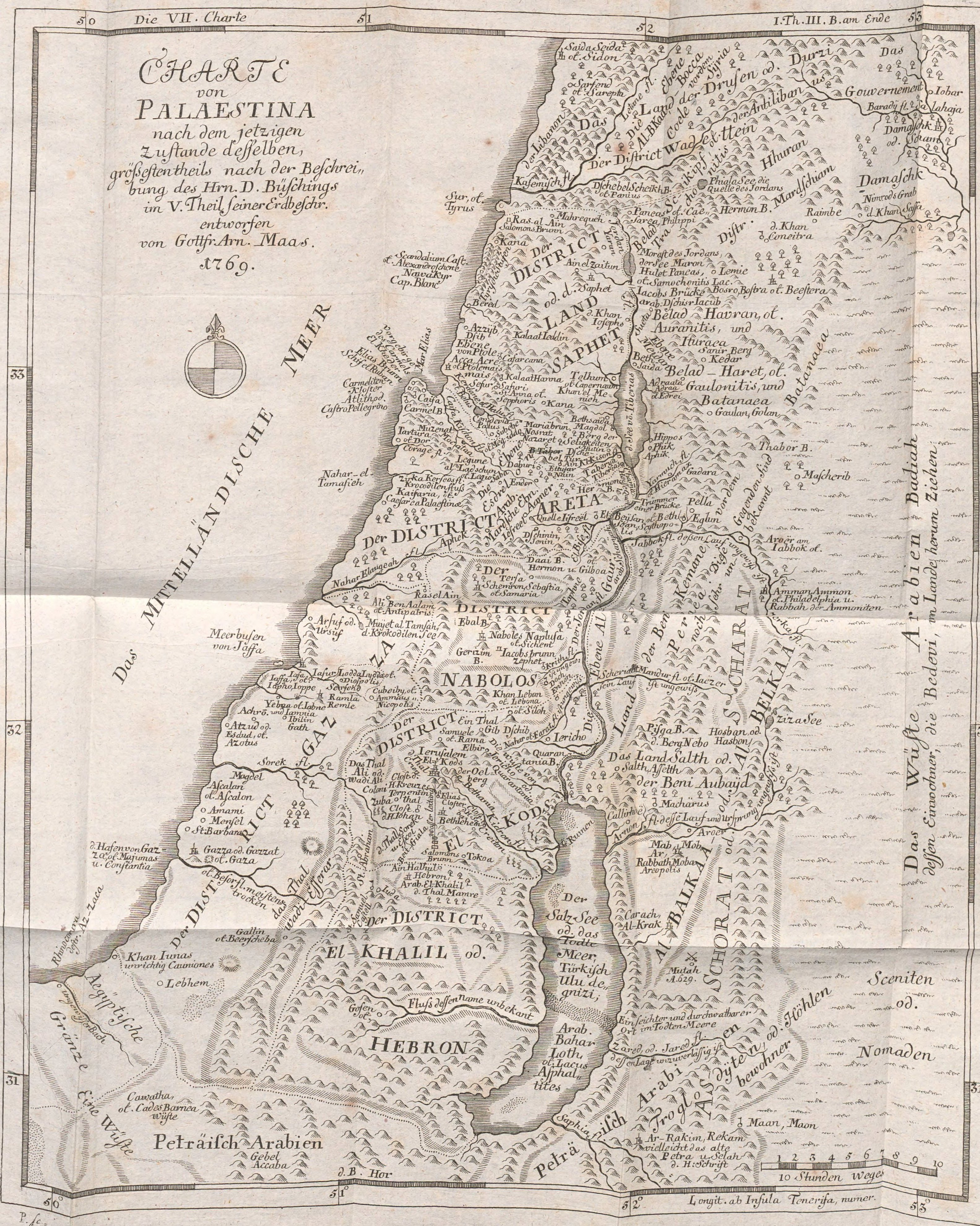
Map of Palestine dated to 1769 demarcating the district of Gaza under Ottoman rule

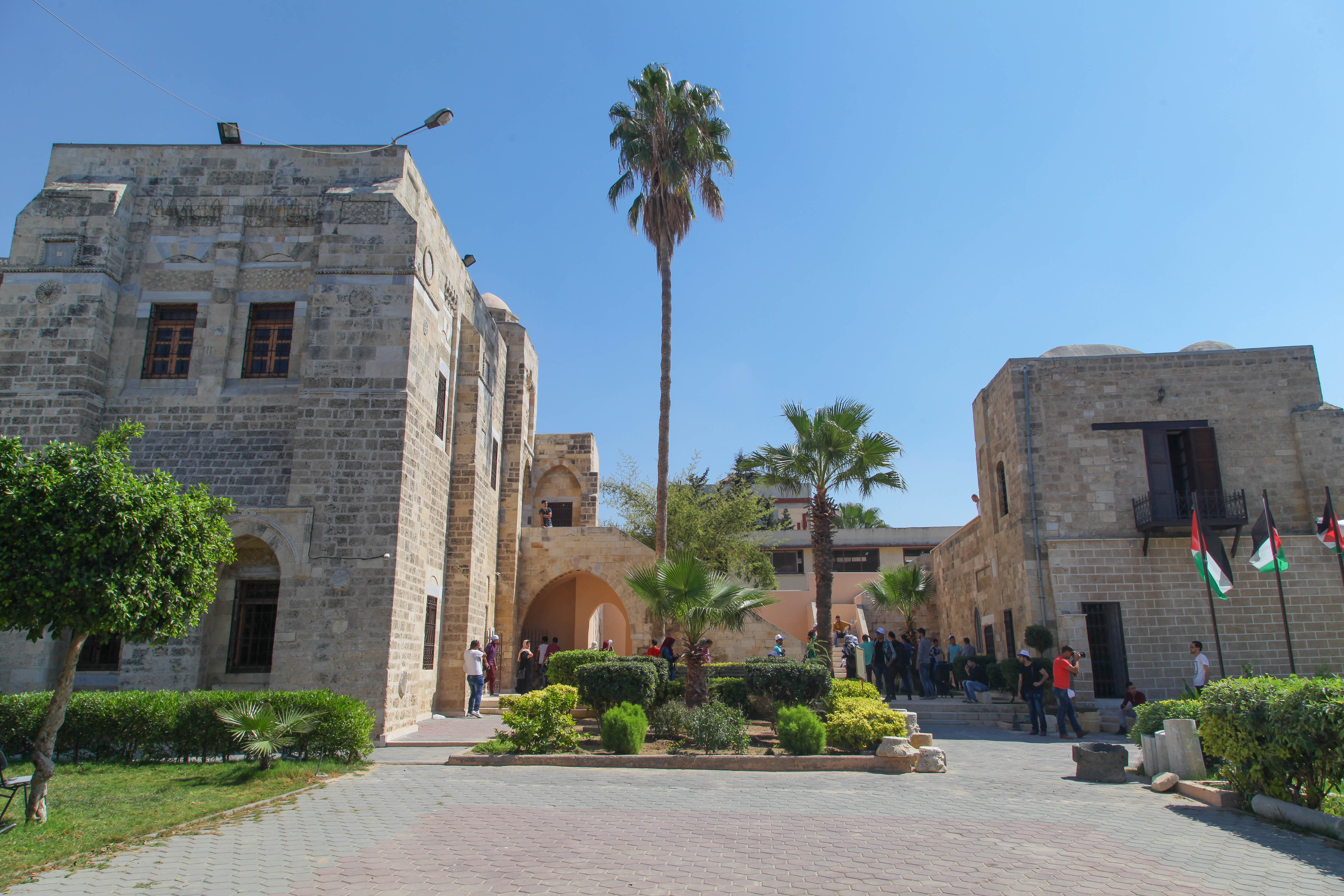
Qasr al-Basha, also known as the Qasr of the Ridwan family

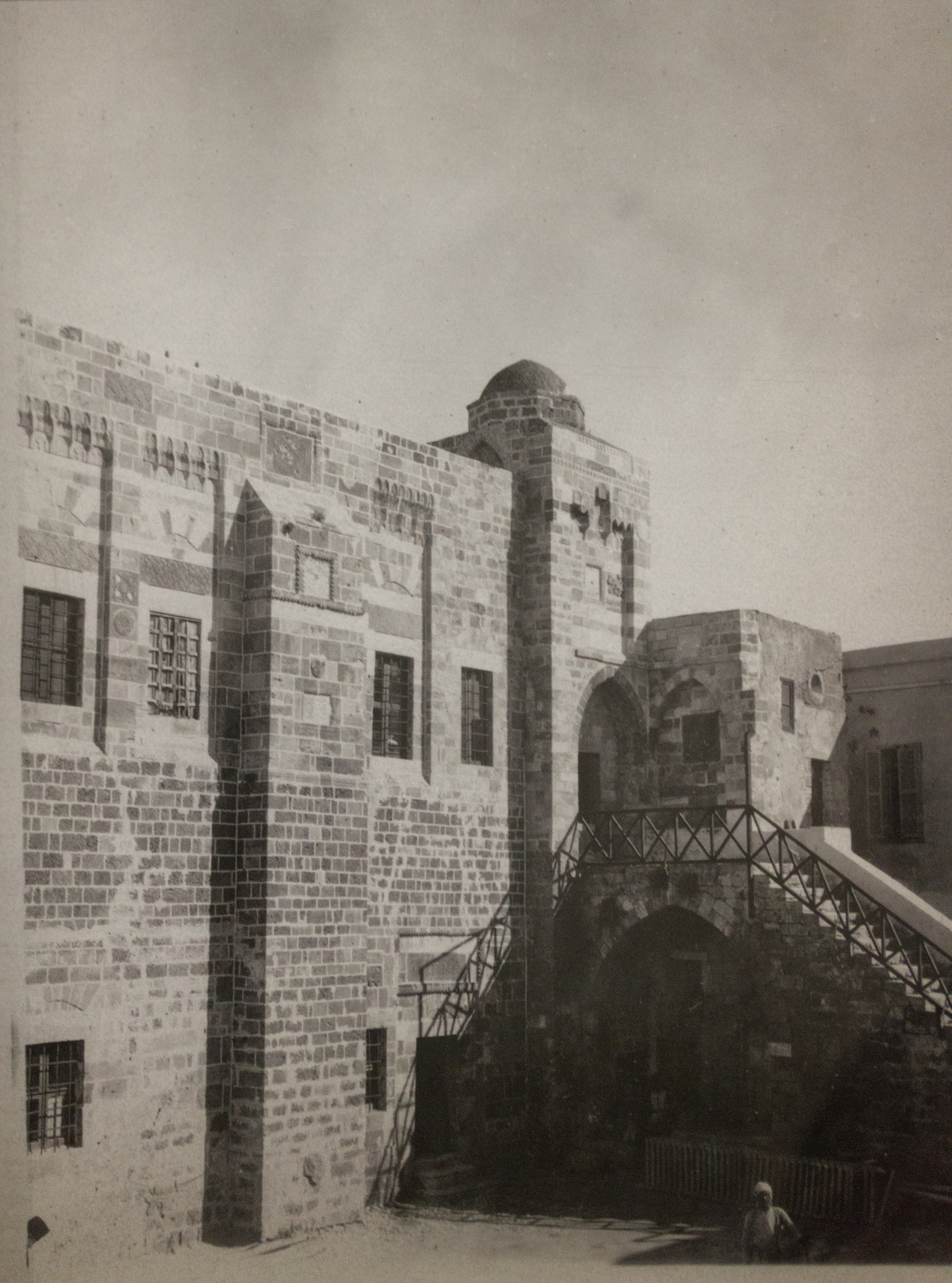
Inside the courtyard of Qasr al-Basha in 1922

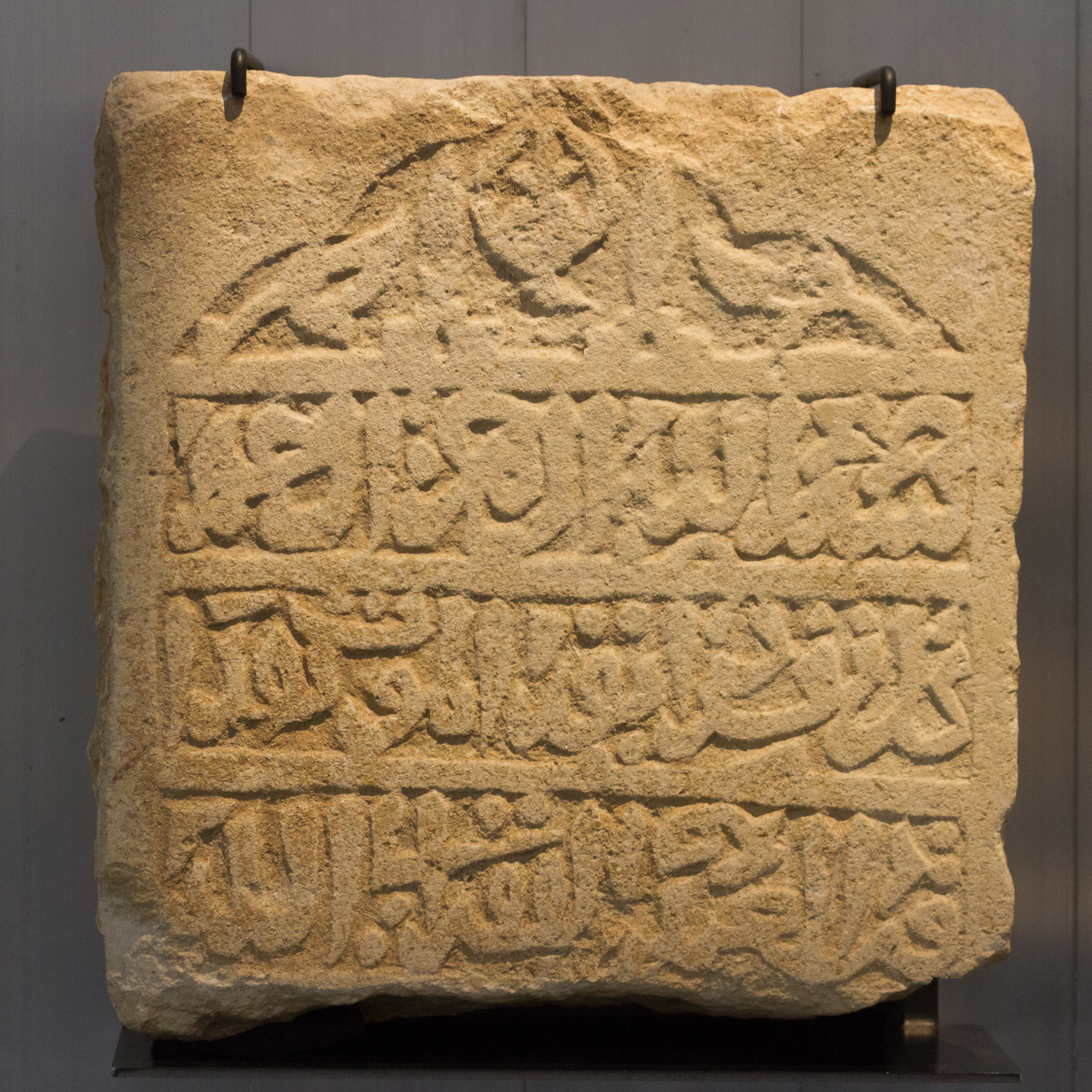
Funerary stele in the Arabic Naskh script (c. 17th-19th centuries). It reads: "In the name of God, the most merciful and compassionate, Every soul tastes death. Here lies the soul of your humble servant whose hope is in God."

=== Early Ottoman rule and the Ridwan dynasty ===
In 1516, Gaza—by now a small town with an inactive port, ruined buildings and reduced trade—was incorporated into the Ottoman Empire. The Ottoman army quickly and efficiently crushed a small-scale uprising, and much of the local population generally welcomed them as fellow Sunni Muslims. There were still Christians and even a small Samaritan community in Gaza, the last of the latter known to have still lived in this city until 1726.

Shortly after Palestine's quick submission to the Ottomans, it was divided into six districts, including the Gaza Sanjak (District of Gaza), which stretched from Jaffa in the north to Bayt Jibrin in the east and Rafah in the south. The sanjak was a part of the larger Damascus Eyalet or the "Province of Damascus". In that time, the majority of the Christian population of Shoubak migrated to Gaza, making it the largest Christian center of Palestine and an important source of support for the monastery of St. Catherine on the Sinai.

An early governor of Gaza Sanjak was Kara Shahin Mustafa, a former jannissary (member of a military corps) who rose to become an elite military officer and state minister and eventually a vizier and trusted aide of Sultan Suleiman the Magnificent. He received the governorship of Gaza apparently as an interim appointment before he was appointed Governor of Egypt, although he was deposed three years later by Sultan Selim II. Mustafa died a short while later and his son Ridwan Pasha, who was the treasurer of Yemen, became governor shortly before Mustafa's death. The Ridwan dynasty, which would rule Gaza for over a century, derives its name from Ridwan Pasha. He was later appointed Governor of Yemen, but was deposed two years later and returned to the governorship of Gaza. After becoming governor of Ethiopia, Basra, and Diyarbakır in that order, he successfully led an Ottoman contingent against Safavid Persia in 1579. The sultan then awarded him the province of Anatolia, where he died in 1585.

Although no explanation is provided in the biographies of the Ridwan family, it is evident they chose Gaza as their home and built there their residence, known as Qasr al-Basha, 'the Pasha's castle'. Ridwan Pasha's son Ahmad Pasha succeeded him and governed Gaza for thirty years, sometimes incorporating the sanjaks of Nablus and Jerusalem. He became Governor of Damascus Eyalet in 1601 after bribing several viziers and bureaucrats in Istanbul. He died in 1607. Next in line was Hasan Pasha ibn Ahmad who became known 'Arab Hasan ("Hasan the Bedouin") because by then, the Ridwans were identified with being well-versed with the Bedouin and controlling them. He successfully led his pro-Ottoman Bedouin troops against the army of the rebel Druze emir, Fakhr ad-Din, in a series of battles. He was later appointed Governor of Tripoli in today's Lebanon, but he was deposed in 1644. 'Arab Hasan had many wives and concubines, who bore him 85 children. He led the Ridwans successfully militarily, however, he burdened the dynasty with heavy debt.

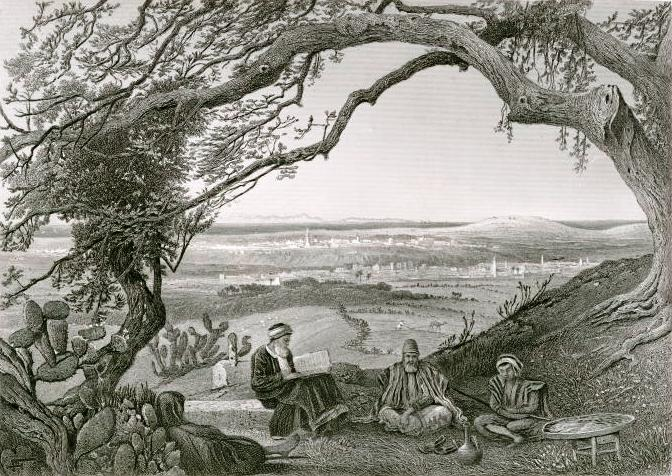
Muslims studying the Qur'an with Gaza in the background, painting by Harry Fenn

'Arab Hasan's son Husayn Pasha was governor of Nablus and Jerusalem, and inherited the impoverished governorship of Gaza when his father died. He borrowed a large sum from the French in order to meet the heavy taxes imposed on the city by Hassan Aga, governor Sidon Eyalet—the province that Gaza briefly belonged to. Husayn's period in office was peaceful and prosperous for the city, and he gained a good reputation for considerably reducing the strife between the nearby Bedouin and the settled population. He appointed his son Ibrahim to be governor of the Gaza and Jerusalem sanjaks, but when Ibrahim was killed during an expedition against the Druze in Mount Lebanon in 1660, Husayn resumed control of Gaza. The city began to recover and thrive, being described as the "capitol of Palestine" due to its status. The Great Mosque was restored, and six other mosques constructed, while hammams and market stalls proliferated. Anonymous petitions from Damascus sent to Istanbul complaining about Husayn's failure to protect the hajj caravan and his alleged pro-Christian tendencies, however, served as an excuse for the Ottoman government to depose him. He was soon imprisoned in Damascus and his assets confiscated by provincial authorities. He was later sent to Istanbul and died in prison there in 1663.

Husayn's brother Musa Pasha then governed Gaza into the early 1670s, implementing an anti-French and anti-Christian regime to appease the Ottoman government. Soon after his reign ended, Ottomans officials were appointed to govern. The Ridwan period is considered Gaza's last golden age during Ottoman rule and the city gradually dwindled after they were removed from office.

=== After the Ridwans ===
In 1723, the Ottomans appointed Salih Pasha Tuqan of the Nablus-based Tuqan family to govern Gaza and two other sanjaks until his death in 1742. In the 1750s, local Bedouin tribes disposed of the plunder from a Meccan caravan, consisting of 13,000 camel-loads of goods, into Gaza's markets, boosting the city's wealth. The attack on the caravan was a reprisal to the Ottomans who had recently replaced the governor of Damascus. In 1763, there was a revolt in Gaza against the Ottomans. Then, in November 1770, Ali Bey al-Kabir, the rebellious Mamluk sultan of Egypt, sent troops to Gaza to aid Zahir al-Umar in the Galilee, helping him check the power of the Ottomans in the Levant. Gaza was briefly occupied by the French Army under Napoleon Bonaparte, who referred to it as "the outpost of Africa, the door to Asia", in 1799. Most of its inhabitants fled as a result. His forces easily razed the remains of the city walls (which had not been rebuilt since their destruction by Saladin), but abandoned the city after their failed siege of Acre that same year. The duration of French influence in Gaza was too short to have a palpable effect.

=== Egyptian rule and Ottoman revival ===
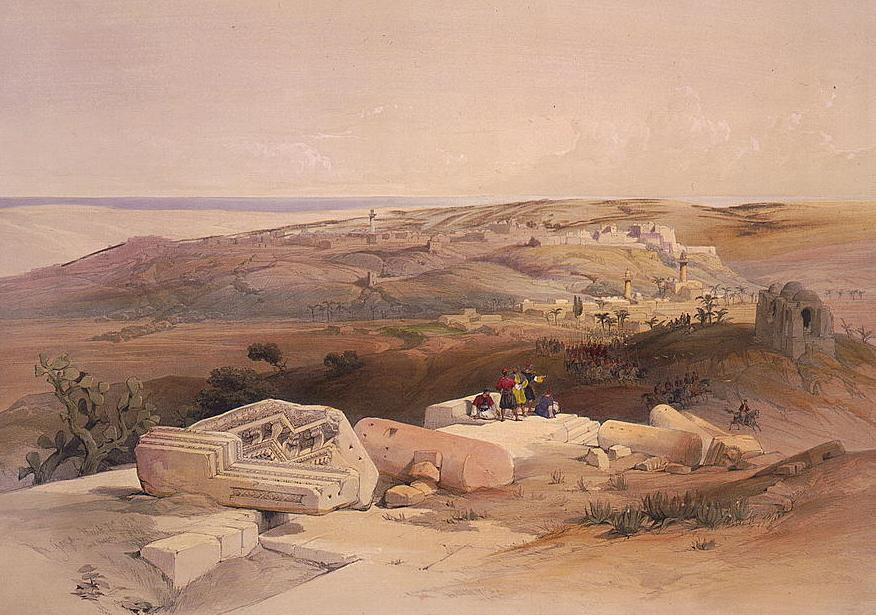
Painting of Gaza by David Roberts, 1839, in The Holy Land, Syria, Idumea, Arabia, Egypt, and Nubia

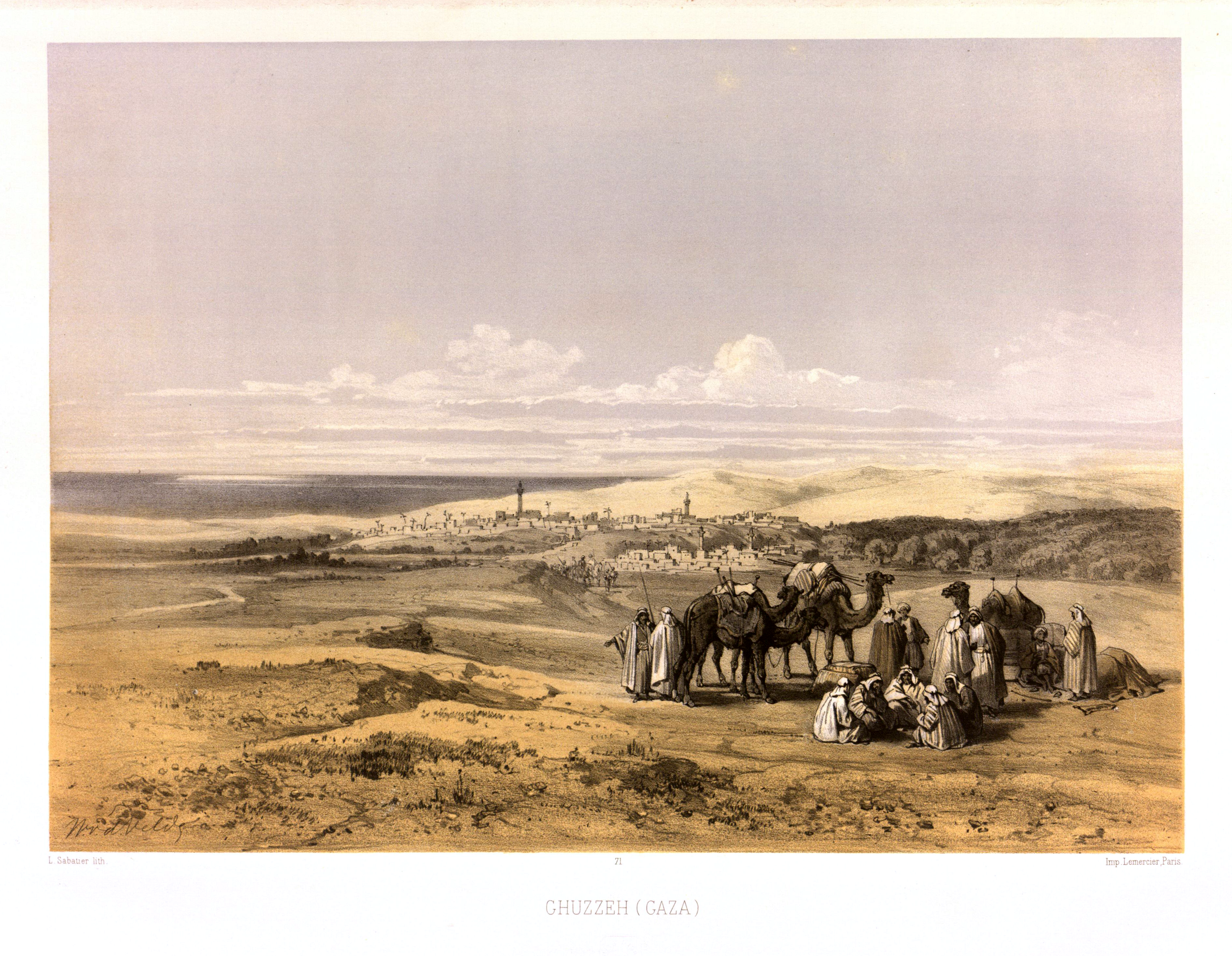
Ghuzzeh (Gaza), painting by Charles van de Velde

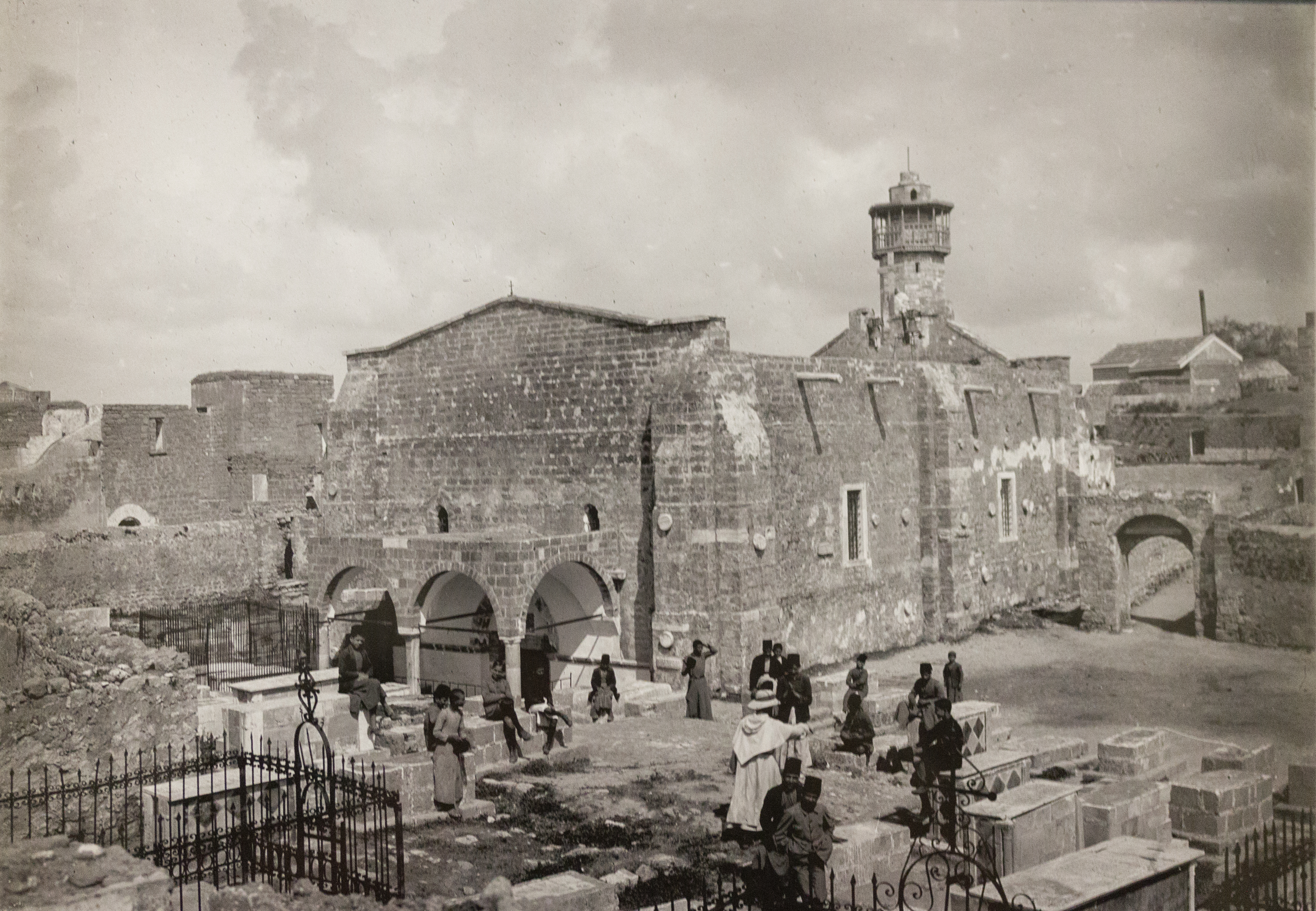
Church of Saint Porphyrius in 1922

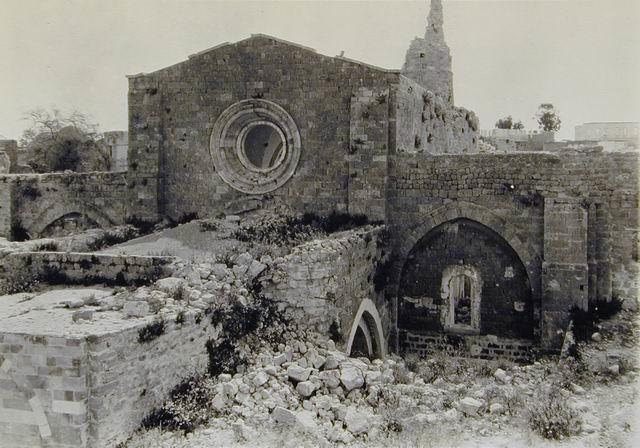
The Great Mosque of Gaza was heavily damaged by British artillery during World War I

Gaza was culturally dominated by neighboring Egypt from the early 19th century; Muhammad Ali of Egypt conquered it and most of Palestine in 1832. Strangely, in 1833, Muhammad Ali instructed his son Ibrahim Pasha not to purchase Gaza's cotton harvest (cotton production was Ali's main source of wealth and Egypt's production was low that year), instead allowing its residents to dispose of it how they wished.

American scholar Edward Robinson visited Gaza in 1838, describing it as a "thickly populated" town larger than Jerusalem, with its Old City lying upon a hilltop, while its suburbs laid on the nearby plain. He further stated that its soil was rich and supported groves of "delicious and abundant" apricots and mulberries. Although Gaza's port was by then inactive, it benefited from trade and commerce because of its position on the caravan route between Egypt and Syria, as well as from the production of soap and cotton for trade with the Bedouin. The governor of Gaza at the time was Sheikh Sa'id. Robinson noted that virtually all of Gaza's vestiges of ancient history and antiquity had disappeared due to constant conflict and occupation.

The bubonic plague struck again in 1839 and the city stagnated, as it lacked political and economic stability. In 1840, Egyptian and Ottoman troops battled outside of Gaza, with the Ottomans emerging victorious, effectively ending Egyptian rule over Palestine. The battles brought about more death and destruction, just barely after the city began to recover from the plague. The Church of Saint Porphyrius was renovated in 1856, and in 1874, French orientalist Charles Clermont-Ganneau visited Gaza, gathering and cataloging a sizable collection of Byzantine inscriptions and describing the city's Great Mosque in detail. Sultan Abdul Hamid II had the wells of Gaza restored in 1893.

Although the first municipal council of Gaza was formed in 1893 under the chairmanship of Ali Khalil Shawa, modern mayorship began in 1906 with his son Said al-Shawa, who was appointed mayor by Ottoman authorities. Like other regions and cities in Palestine at the time, Gaza was economically and politically dominated by a number of powerful clans, particularly the Shawa, Husseini, and Sourani families. Two destructive earthquakes occurred in 1903 and 1914.

When World War I erupted in 1917, British forces were defeated by the Ottomans in the first and second Battle of Gaza. General Edmund Allenby, leading the Allied Forces, finally conquered Gaza in a third battle.

== British Mandate ==
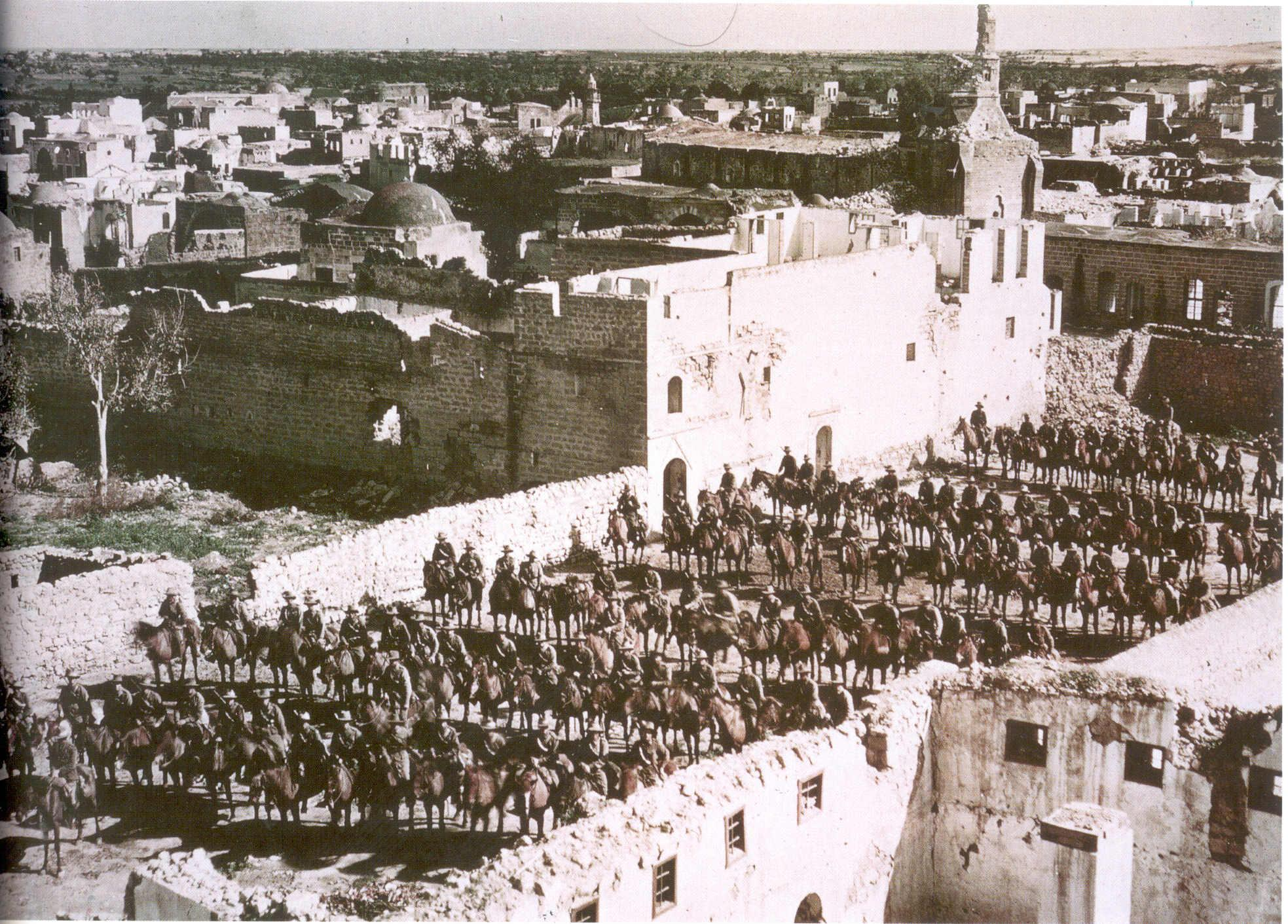
Gaza after surrender to British forces, 1918

After the First World War, the League of Nations granted quasi-colonial authority over former Ottoman territories to Great Britain and France, with Gaza becoming part of the British Mandate of Palestine.

During the 1929 Palestine riots, the Jewish Quarter of Gaza was destroyed and most of Gaza's fifty Jewish families fled the city. In the 1930s and 1940s, Gaza underwent major expansion, with new neighborhoods, such as Rimal and Zeitoun being built along the coast, and the southern and eastern plains. Areas damaged in the riots underwent reconstruction. Most of the funding for these developments came from international organizations and missionary groups.

Gaza War Cemetery, one of the world's many Commonwealth war cemeteries, contains the graves of soldiers from the British Empire and Commonwealth dating back as far as World War One. The majority of the graves (3082 of 3691) are British, but there are also the graves of 263 Australians, 50 Indians, 23 New Zealanders, 23 Canadians, 36 Poles, and 184 Ottoman-era Turkish graves, plus small numbers of South African, Greek, Egyptian, German, French and Yugoslav soldiers.

== Egyptian control ==
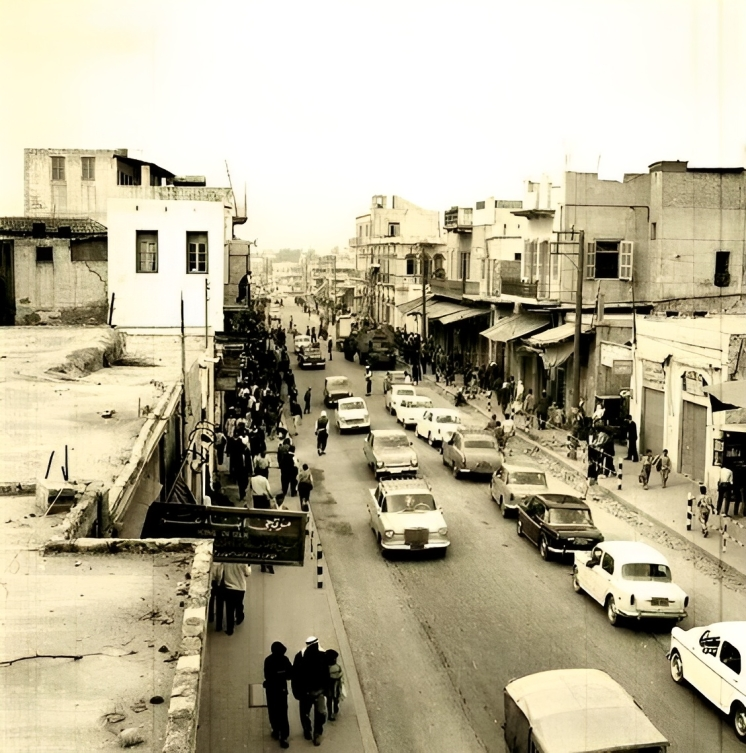
Omar Al-Mukhtar Street in Gaza in 1964

An UNRWA classroom for children of Palestinian refugees in Gaza in 1965

At the conclusion of the 1948 Arab–Israeli War, Egypt was in control of Gaza and the surrounding area, that came to be called the Gaza Strip. Gaza's growing population was augmented by an influx of refugees fleeing nearby cities, towns and villages that were captured by Israel. From 1948 until 1959, Gaza was nominally under the jurisdiction of the All-Palestine Government, an entity established by the Arab League during the 1948 Arab–Israeli War, purportedly as the government for a liberated Palestine. However, the government was ineffective with little or no influence over events in Gaza and was dissolved by Cairo in 1959. Egyptian occupation of the Gaza Strip was broken for four months during the 1956 Suez Crisis.

Upon the withdrawal of Israeli forces, Egyptian president Gamal Abdel Nasser issued several reforms in Gaza, including the expansion of educational opportunities and civil services, provision of housing and the establishment of local security forces. As in Egypt, political activity in Gaza was severely curtailed, but the government-sponsored Arab National Union was established in place of the All-Palestine Government that Nasser abolished in 1959, which gave the city's citizens a greater voice in national politics. In 1959, with the abolishment of the All-Palestine Government, Gaza officially became a part of the United Arab Republic, a union of Syria and Egypt, under the pan-Arab policy of Nasser. In reality, however, Gaza was under direct Egyptian military governorship, which also continued upon the withdrawal of Syria from the UAR shortly afterwards. When the Palestine Liberation Organization (PLO) was founded in 1964, Nasser formally, but not practically, proclaimed that it would hold authority over Gaza, and a year later, conscription was instituted for the Palestinian Liberation Army.

== Israeli control ==
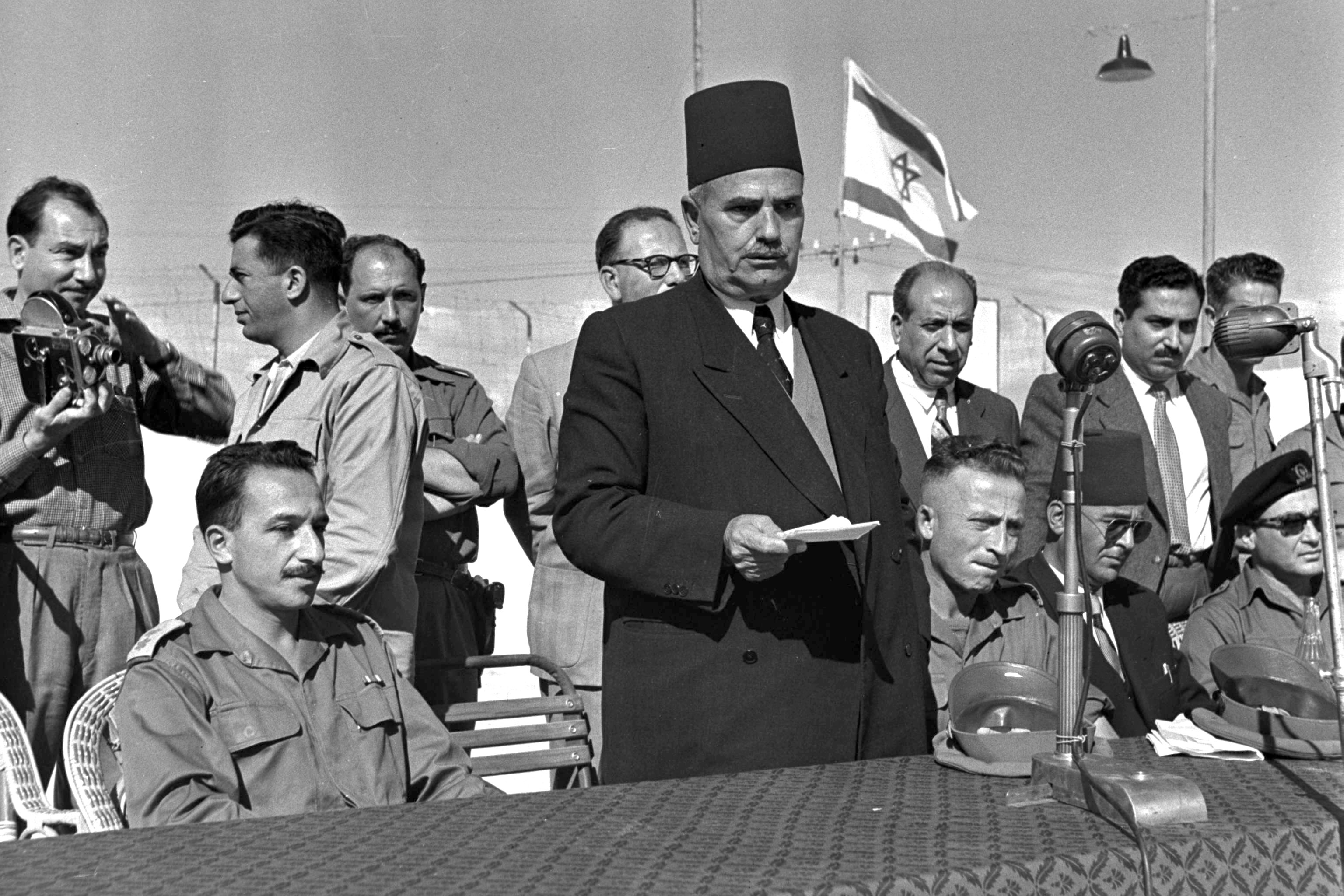
The newly appointed mayor of Gaza, Rushdi al-Shawwa, speaking at the inauguration ceremony of the Gaza municipal council, 26 November 1956

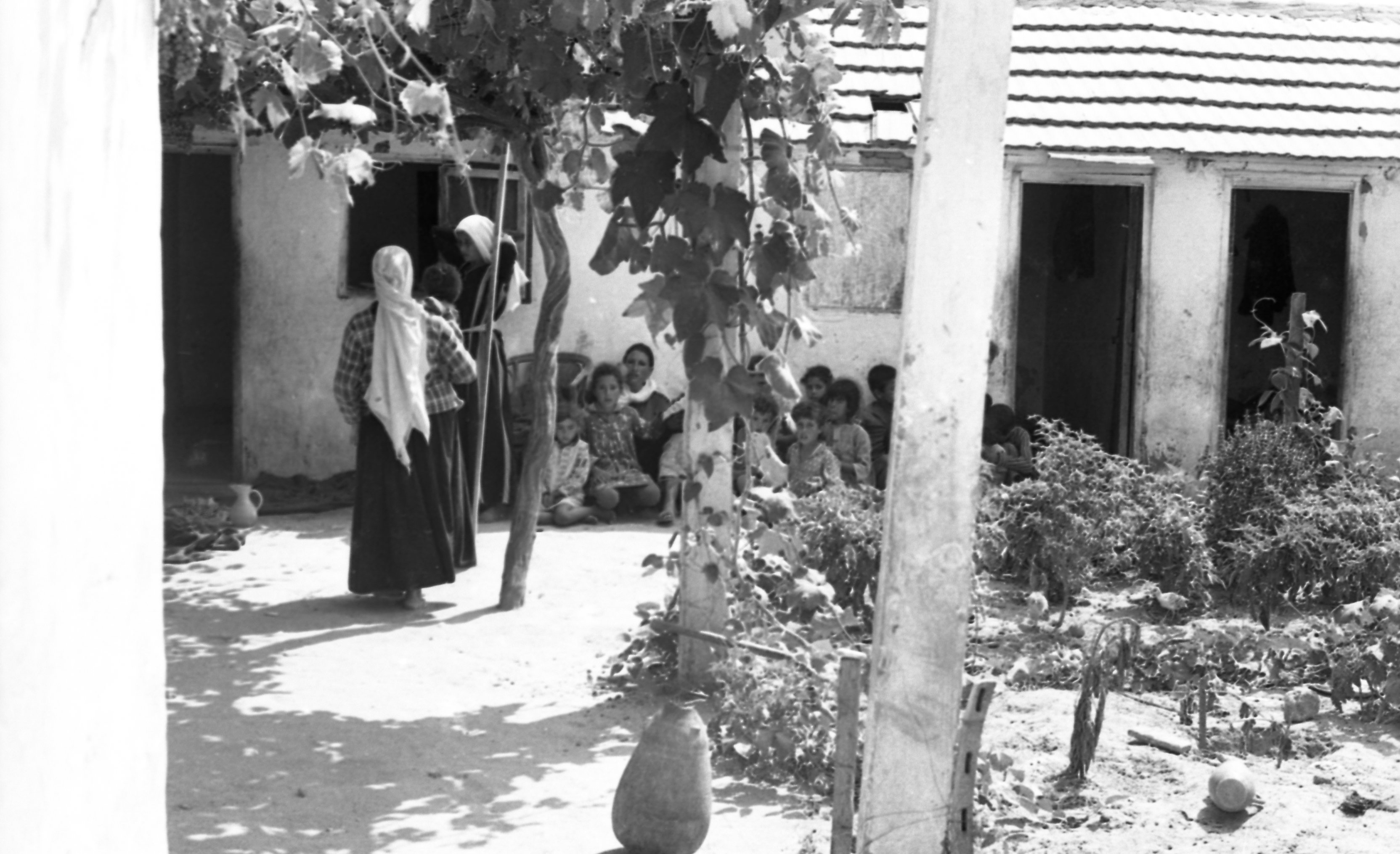
Photo from the Israel Press and Photo Agency dated 1971. It shows women and children gathered in the interior courtyard of a typical home in Gaza. The file name is "IDF soldiers patrolling Gaza City. Some were arrested on suspicion of terrorist activity (FL61548956)"

Gaza was invaded and occupied by Israel in 1967 following the Six-Day War. Israel created the Israeli Military Governorate to administrate territories it captured, including Gaza. Israeli settlements began to be established in the Gaza Strip.

Organized armed struggle against Israel in Gaza peaked between 1969 and 1971, but was largely crushed by the Israel Defense Forces (IDF) under the command of Ariel Sharon. Militants targeted Arabs working at Israeli companies, and in one instance, killed a Jewish family. In response, Sharon conducted a year long operation, authorized by Shlomo Gazit, involving the demolition of homes and the employment of special assassination teams that killed suspects. Israel also began to set up detainment camps, arresting families of suspected suspects, and some Gazan youths who weren't accused of anything. The purpose was to dissuade other families from allowing their sons to join Fatah. The camps were located in remote desert areas, holding as many as 50 people. The Red Cross described detainees' treatment there as 'merciless'.

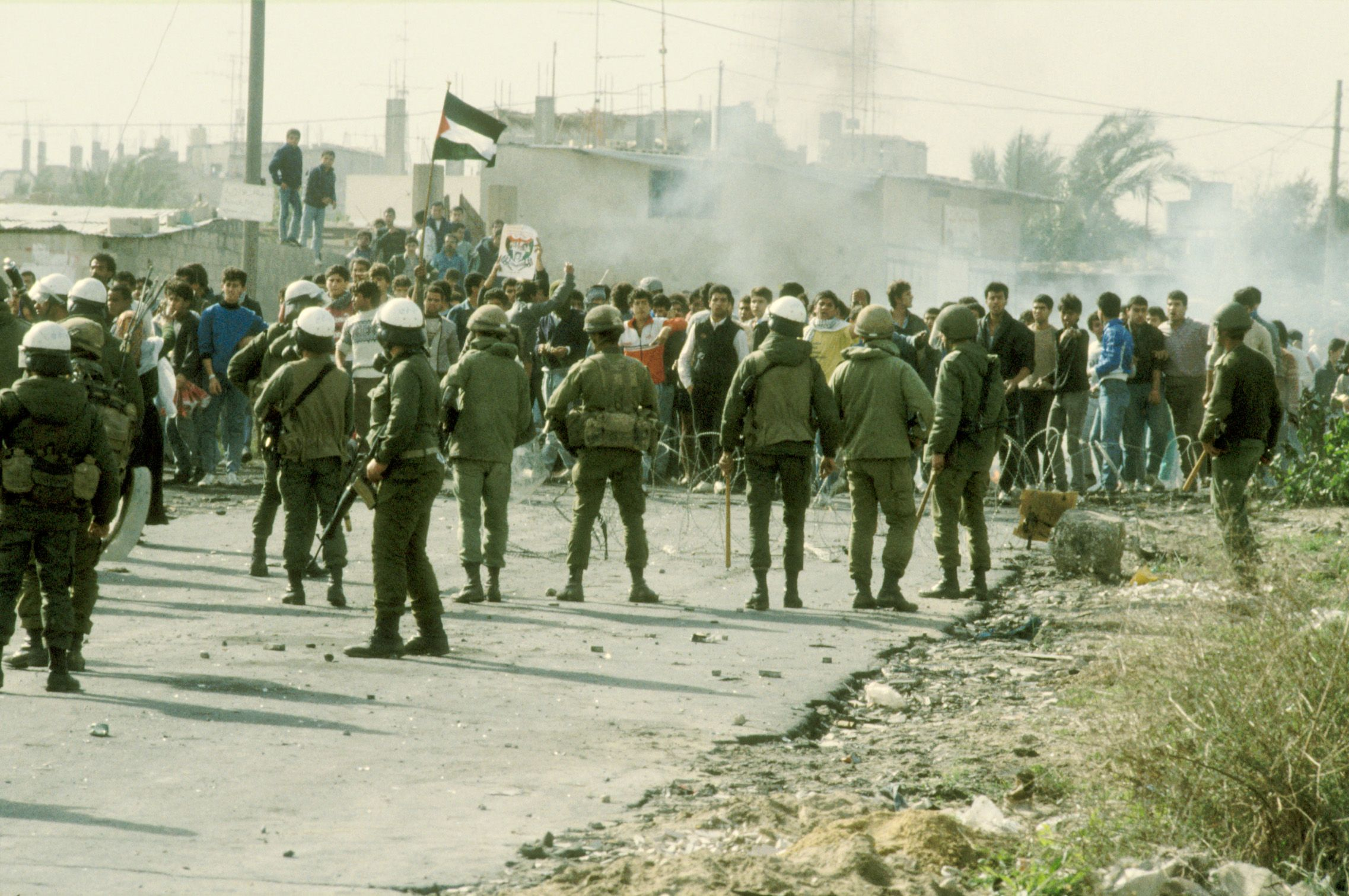
Israeli soldiers and Palestinian protesters in Gaza during the First Intifada, 1987

In 1971, the IDF destroyed parts of the Al-Shati refugee camp to widen roads for security reasons. Israel developed new housing schemes nearby that resulted in the establishment of the northern Sheikh Radwan district. The United Nations Relief and Works Agency and the Palestine Liberation Organization were vociferous in their opposition to the move, claiming it was forced resettlement. In 1972, Gaza's military governor dismissed the city's mayor, Rashad al-Shawwa, for refusing to annex al-Shati camp to the municipality of Gaza. Frequent conflicts erupted between Palestinians and the Israeli authorities in the city after the 1970s.

In December 1987, an uprising began in the occupied territories, called the First Intifada. Gaza became a center of confrontation during this uprising, resulting in a 142 deaths and a damaged economy.

== Palestinian administration ==
=== Palestinian Authority ===
In September 1993, after the First Intifada, leaders of Israel and the PLO signed the Oslo Accords, allowing Palestinian administration of the Gaza Strip and the West Bank town of Jericho. This was implemented in 1994, and Israeli forces withdrew from Gaza, leaving the new Palestinian Authority (PA) to administer and police the city. Led by Yasser Arafat, the PA chose Gaza as its first provincial headquarters. The newly established Palestinian National Council held its inaugural session in Gaza in March 1996.

In 2000, following the failure of the 2000 Camp David Summit, another Palestinian uprising was launched, called the Second Intifada. Gaza again became an area of confrontation.

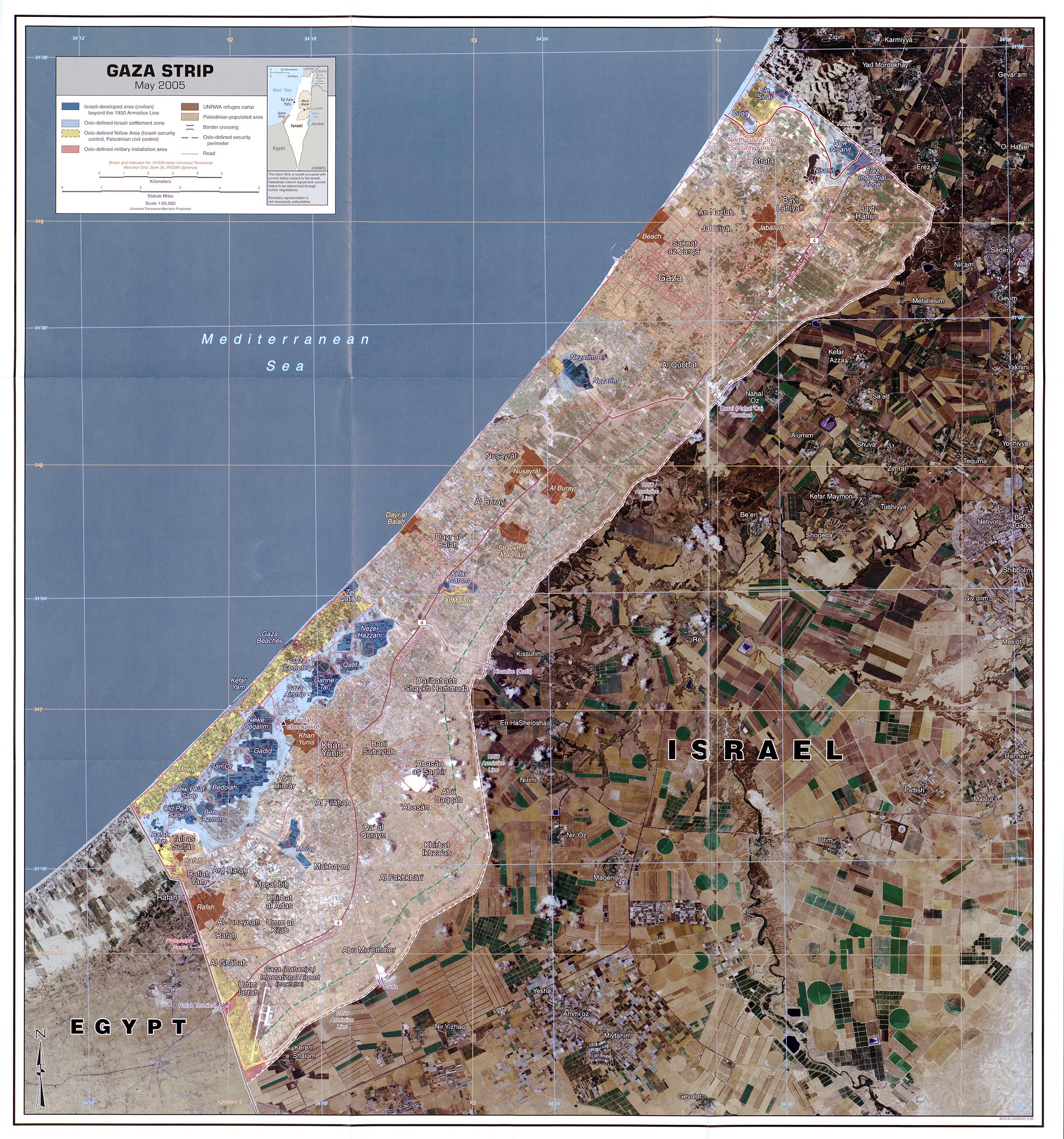
Map of the Gaza Strip in May 2005. Major settlement blocs shaded in blue.

In 2005, Israel implemented its unilateral disengagement plan under which it completely withdrew Israeli armed forces and settlements from the Gaza Strip. Violence during the Second Intifada contributed to the decision.

In 2006, Sunni-Islamist group Hamas won the Palestinian legislative election against Fatah, resulting in a government led by the group. Tensions between the groups led to a power-sharing agreement signed in Mecca. However, these tensions continued, and culminated in a brief civil war which saw Hamas take control of the Gaza Strip. Hamas was ousted from the PA, which retained control of the West Bank.

=== Hamas takeover and conflict with Israel ===
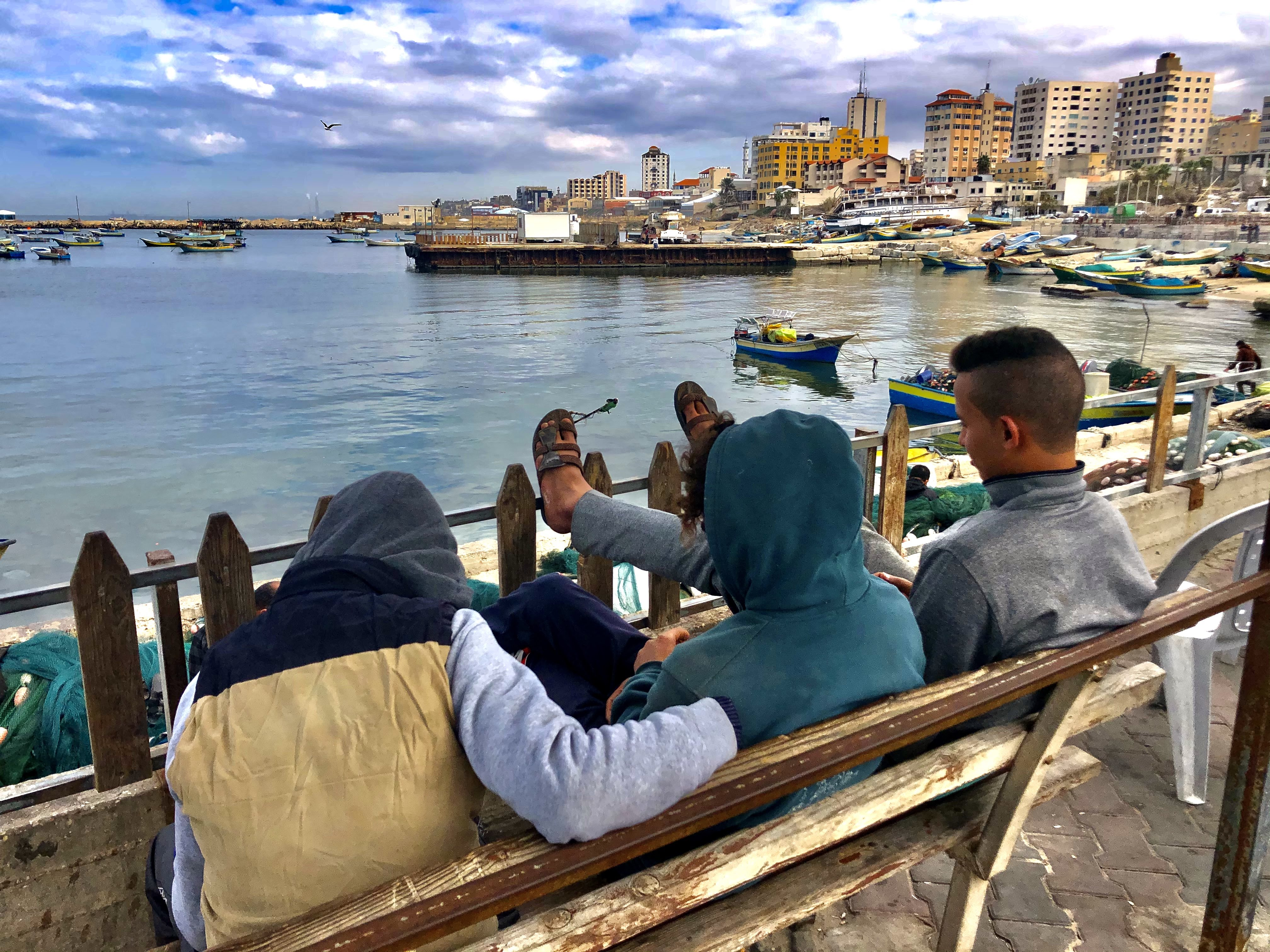
Gaza's sea port in 2020 (Photographer: Mounir Kleibo)

After Hamas' takeover, Israel blockaded the Gaza Strip and implemented restrictions on movement. These policies led to further poverty and lessened resources in the city. Hamas conducted rocket attacks on Israel, as to pressure it to lift the blockade.

In late 2008, Israel raided part of the Gaza Strip to destroy Hamas tunnels, leading to clashes and a short war. Israel surrounded and invaded Gaza, heavily bombing the city. Early in 2009, a ceasefire was reached and Israel withdrew from the Strip. The war resulted in more than 1,000 Gazan deaths.

In 2014, Israel initiated a war against Hamas, aiming to stop its rocket fire. Israel bombed the Strip and city, and eventually invaded it. Israel entered the Shuja'iyya neighborhood, resulting in a battle with heavy civilian casualties. After Israel destroyed a large amount of Hamas tunnels, it withdrew from the Gaza Strip, and a ceasefire was implemented soon after. 2,251 Gazans were killed in the war, 65 percent of which were civilians, according to the UN.

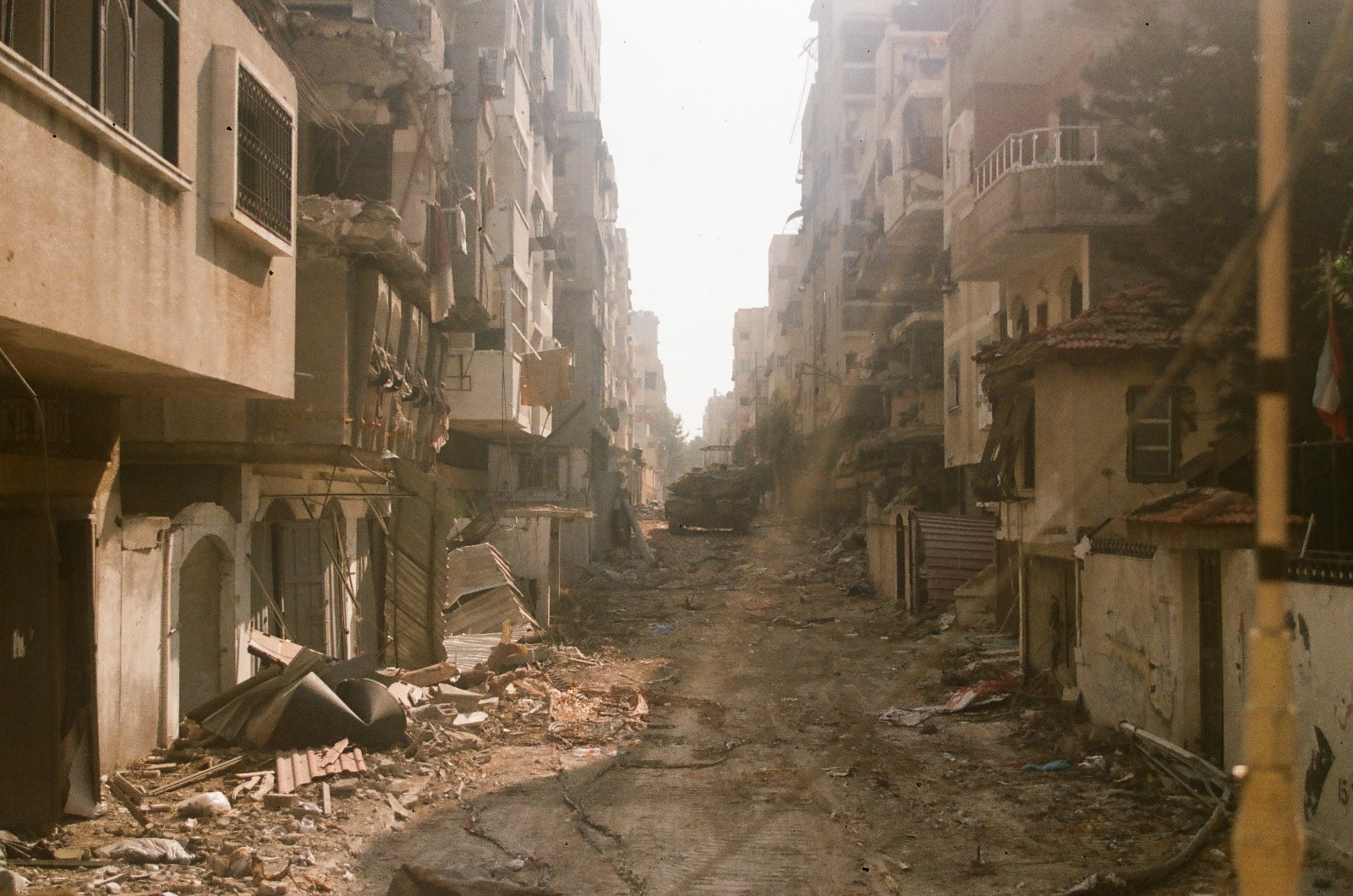
During the Gaza war, 1.9 million people were internally displaced within Gaza, 46,000 Palestinians had been killed, and nearly 70% of buildings in the Gaza Strip had been damaged or destroyed.

On 7 October 2023, the Al-Qassam Brigades, Hamas' military wing, invaded southern Israel and killed about 1,200 people including more than 800 civilians, and took 251 hostages. Israel retaliated heavily, imposing a total blockade on the Gaza Strip and bombing it. In preparation for a ground invasion, Israel ordered the evacuation of 1.1 million people in the northern Gaza Strip. Soon after, Israel surrounded and invaded the city, occupying it for eight months.

Northern Gaza was heavily depopulated due to forces evacuation orders issued by the Israeli military, with about only 300,000 people remaining in the region. The remaining population was subjected to a humanitarian crisis and starvation brought on by the war. 70 percent of the city was destroyed by airstrikes, and more than 40,000 people were killed in the Strip. Israel was accused of committing a genocide of Palestinians in Gaza during the war, with South Africa initiating proceedings at the International Court of Justice against Israel. Following the ceasefire of October 2025, hundreds of thousands of people returned to Gaza City and the north of the Strip, the vast majority of them living in makeshift shelters or the ruins of their homes.

== Chronology of the sovereignty over Gaza ==
The red bars in the chronology below indicate periods during which the indicated group had limited self-rule, and not sovereignty.

== See also ==
- History of Palestine
- List of archaeological sites in the Gaza Strip
- List of rulers of Gaza
- History of the Jews in Gaza City
- Saved Treasures of Gaza: 5000 Years of History

== Sources ==
- Abu Khalaf, Marwan F. (1983). "Khan Yunus and the Khans of Palestine". Levant. 15 (1): 178–186. doi:10.1179/lev.1983.15.1.178.
- Abu-Lughod, J.; Dumper, Michael (2007). Cities of the Middle East and North Africa: A Historical Encyclopedia. ABC-CLIO. ISBN 978-1-57607-919-5.
- Bassir, H. (2017). "The Egyptian expansion in the near east in the Saite period" (PDF). The Journal of Faculty of Arts Alexandria University. 67 (89): 1–44.
- Bitton-Askeloni, Bruria; Kofsky, Arieh (2004). Christian Gaza In Late Antiquity. BRILL. ISBN 978-90-04-13868-1.
- Dothan, T. (1978). Excavations at the cemetery of Deir el-Balah. Qedem. Vol. 10. Institute of Archaeology, Hebrew University of Jerusalem. JSTOR 43587093.
- Doumani, B. (1995). Rediscovering Palestine: Merchants and Peasants in Jabal Nablus, 1700-1900. University of California Press. ISBN 0-520-20370-4.
- Dowling, T.E. (1913). Gaza: A City of Many Battles (from the family of Noah to the Present Day). S.P.C.K.
- Dumper, Michael; Stanley, Bruce E.; Abu-Lughod, Janet L. (2007). Cities of the Middle East and North Africa: A Historical Encyclopedia. ABC-CLIO. ISBN 978-1-57607-919-5.. ISBN 9781576079195 (13).
- Elayi, J. (2017). Sargon II, King of Assyria. Atlanta: Society of Biblical Literature Press. ISBN 978-1-62837-177-2.
- Feldman, Ilana (2008). Governing Gaza: Bureaucracy, Authority, and the Work of Rule, 1917-1967. Duke University Press. ISBN 978-0-8223-4240-3.
- Farhi, Yoav (2015). "Cleopatra in Gaza(?): A Hitherto Unpublished Coin Type from Gaza and the First Year of Coinage in Gaza under Roman Rule". American Journal of Numismatics (1989-). 27. American Numismatic Society: 141–154. JSTOR 90017065.
- Filiu, J.-P. (2014). Gaza: A History. Oxford University Press. ISBN 9780190201890.
- Gil, Moshe (1997) [1983]. A History of Palestine, 634–1099. Translated by Ethel Broido. Cambridge: Cambridge University Press. ISBN 0-521-59984-9.
- Graf, D. F. (1 January 2003). Sartre, Maurice (ed.). "Arabs in Syria: Demography and epigraphy". Topoi. La Syrie hellénistique. 13 (Suppl. 4). Lyon, France: Société des Amis de la bibliothèque Salomon-Reinach/Maison de l'Orient et de la Méditerranée Jean Pouilloux (Fédération de recherche sur les sociétés anciennes): 310–340. ISSN 2496-7114 – via Persée.
- Grimal, N. (1988). A History of Ancient Egypt. Librairie Arthéme Fayard.
- Haldimann, Marc-André; Humbert, J.-B. (2007). Gaza: à la croisée des civilisations: contexte archéologique et historique. CHAMAN Edition. ISBN 978-2-9700435-5-3.
- Harries, J. (2012). Imperial Rome AD 284 to 363: The New Empire. Edinburgh University Press. ISBN 978-0-7486-2052-4.
- Horwitz, Liora Kolska; Tchernov, E.; Mienis, Henk K.; Hakker-Orion, Dalia; Bar-Yosef Mayer, Daniella (2002). "The archaeozoology of three Early Bronze Age sites in Nahal Besor, northwestern Negev". In van den Brink, Edwin C. M.; Yannai, Eli (eds.). In Quest of Ancient Settlement and Landscapes: Archaeological Studies in Honour of Ram Gophna. Ramot Publishing and Tel Aviv University. pp. 107–133.
- Husseini, Rafiq; Barnea, Tamara (2002). Separate and Cooperate, Cooperate and Separate: The Disengagement of the Palestine Health Care System from Israel and Its Emergence as an Independent System. Greenwood Publishing Group. ISBN 0-275-97583-5.
- Jacobs, Daniel (1998). Israel and the Palestinian territories. Rough Guides. ISBN 978-0-8021-4350-1.
- Kletter, Raz (2003). "A very general archaeologist: Moshe Dayan and Israeli archaeology" (PDF). The Journal of Hebrew Scriptures. 4. doi:10.5508/jhs.2002.v4.a5. Archived from the original (PDF) on 3 December 2013.
- Le Strange, G. (1890). Palestine Under the Moslems: A Description of Syria and the Holy Land from A.D. 650 to 1500. Committee of the Palestine Exploration Fund.
- Lewis, B. (April 15, 2011). Islam in History: Ideas, People, and Events in the Middle East. Open Court. ISBN 978-0-8126-9757-5.
- Meyer, M. A. (1907). History of the city of Gaza: from the earliest times to the present day. Columbia University Press. ISBN 9780231914321.
- de Miroschedji, P.; Sadeq, M. (2005), "The frontier of Egypt in the Early Bronze Age: preliminary soundings at Tell es-Sakan (Gaza Strip)", in Clarke, Joanne (ed.), Archaeological Perspectives on the Transmission and Transformation of Culture in the Eastern Mediterranean, Council for British Research in the Levant, pp. 155–169, ISBN 978-1-84217-168-4, JSTOR j.ctv310vqks.24
- Morris, Ellen (2021). The Architecture of Imperialism: Military Bases and the Evolution of Foreign Policy in Egypt's New Kingdom. BRILL. ISBN 978-90-474-0613-6.
- Nabulsi, Abdalla J.; Humbert, Jean-Baptiste; Said, Ahmad; Sadeq, M. (2010), "Excavation at the Blakhiya Byzantine cemetery in Gaza, 1996", Revue Biblique, 117 (4): 602–613, JSTOR 44091319
- Oren, Eliezer D.; Yekutieli, Yuval (1992). "Taur Ikhbeineh: Earliest Evidence for Egyptian Interconnections". In van den Brink, Edwin C. M. (ed.). The Nile Delta in Transition: 4th–3rd Millennium B.C. Tel Aviv: Israel Exploration Society. pp. 361–384.
- Panchenko, Constantine A. (24 August 2021). "The "Dark Age" of Middle Eastern Monasticism". Arabic Christianity between the Ottoman Levant and Eastern Europe. BRILL. pp. 33–36. ISBN 978-90-04-46583-1.
- Pressman, Jeremy (21 February 2006). "The Second Intifada: Background and Causes of the Israeli-Palestinian Conflict". Journal of Conflict Studies. 23 (2). ISSN 1715-5673. Archived from the original on 1 November 2020.
- Pringle, D. (1993). The Churches of the Crusader Kingdom of Jerusalem: A Corpus. Cambridge University Press. ISBN 0-521-39037-0.
- Reece, Steve (2025). Wordplay on Proper Names in Luke-Acts. Brill. ISBN 978-90-04-74642-8.
- Rigsby, Kent J. (1997). Asylia: Territorial Inviolability in the Hellenistic World. University of California Press. ISBN 9780520916371.
- Ring, Trudy (1996). Middle East and Africa: International Dictionary of Historic Places. Taylor & Francis. ISBN 1-884964-03-6. ISBN 9781884964039 (13).
- Robinson, E.; Smith, E. (1841). Biblical Researches in Palestine, Mount Sinai and Arabia Petraea: A Journal of Travels in the year 1838. Vol. 2. Boston: Crocker & Brewster.
- Rodan, Simona (2019). Maritime-Related Cults in the Coastal Cities of Philistia During the Roman Period: Legacy and Change. Archaeopress Publishing Ltd. ISBN 9781789692570.
- Sabbagh, K. (2008). Palestine: History of a Lost Nation. Grove Press. ISBN 978-1-900949-48-4.
- Sadeq, M. (2014). "An Overview of Iron Age Gaza in Light of the Archaeological Evidence". Material Culture Matters. De Gruyter. pp. 239–254. doi:10.1515/9781575068787-019. ISBN 978-1-57506-878-7.
- Selby, Jan (2003a). "Dressing up Domination as 'Cooperation': The Case of Israeli-Palestinian Water Relations" (PDF). Review of International Studies. 29 (1): 121–138. doi:10.1017/S026021050300007X. JSTOR 20097837. S2CID 146759349.
- Shahin, Mariam (2005). Palestine: A Guide. Interlink Books. ISBN 1-56656-557-X.
- Shahid, I. (2010). Byzantium and the Arabs, Volume II, Part II. Washington, DC: Dumbarton Oaks, Trustees for Harvard University.
- Sharon, Ilan (2013). "Levantine chronology". The Oxford Handbook of the Archaeology of the Levant. Oxford: Oxford University Press. pp. 44–65. doi:10.1093/oxfordhb/9780199212972.013.004. ISBN 978-0-19-921297-2.
- Sharon, M. (2009). Corpus Inscriptionum Arabicarum Palaestinae, G. Vol. 4. BRILL. ISBN 978-90-04-17085-8.
- Steel, Louise; Manley, Bill; Clarke, Joanne; Sadeq, M. (2002), "Late Bronze Age Gaza: prestige production at el-Moghraqa", Antiquity, 76 (294): 939–940, doi:10.1017/S0003598X00091663
- Yardeni, A.; Kushnir-Stein, A.; Isaac, B.; Misgav, Haggai; Cotton, Hannah M.; Price, Jonathan; Ameling, Walter; Eck, Werner (July 2014). South Coast: 2161-2648 A Multi-lingual Corpus of the Inscriptions from Alexander to Muhammad. De Gruyter. ISBN 9783110337679.
- Xinru Liu (1996). Silk and Religion: An Exploration of Material Life and the Thought of People. Oxford University Press. ISBN 9780195636550.
- Ze'evi, Dror (1996). An Ottoman Century: The District of Jerusalem in the 1600s. SUNY Press. ISBN 0-7914-2915-6.
