= Turabay dynasty =

16th–17th century family of emirs in Palestine

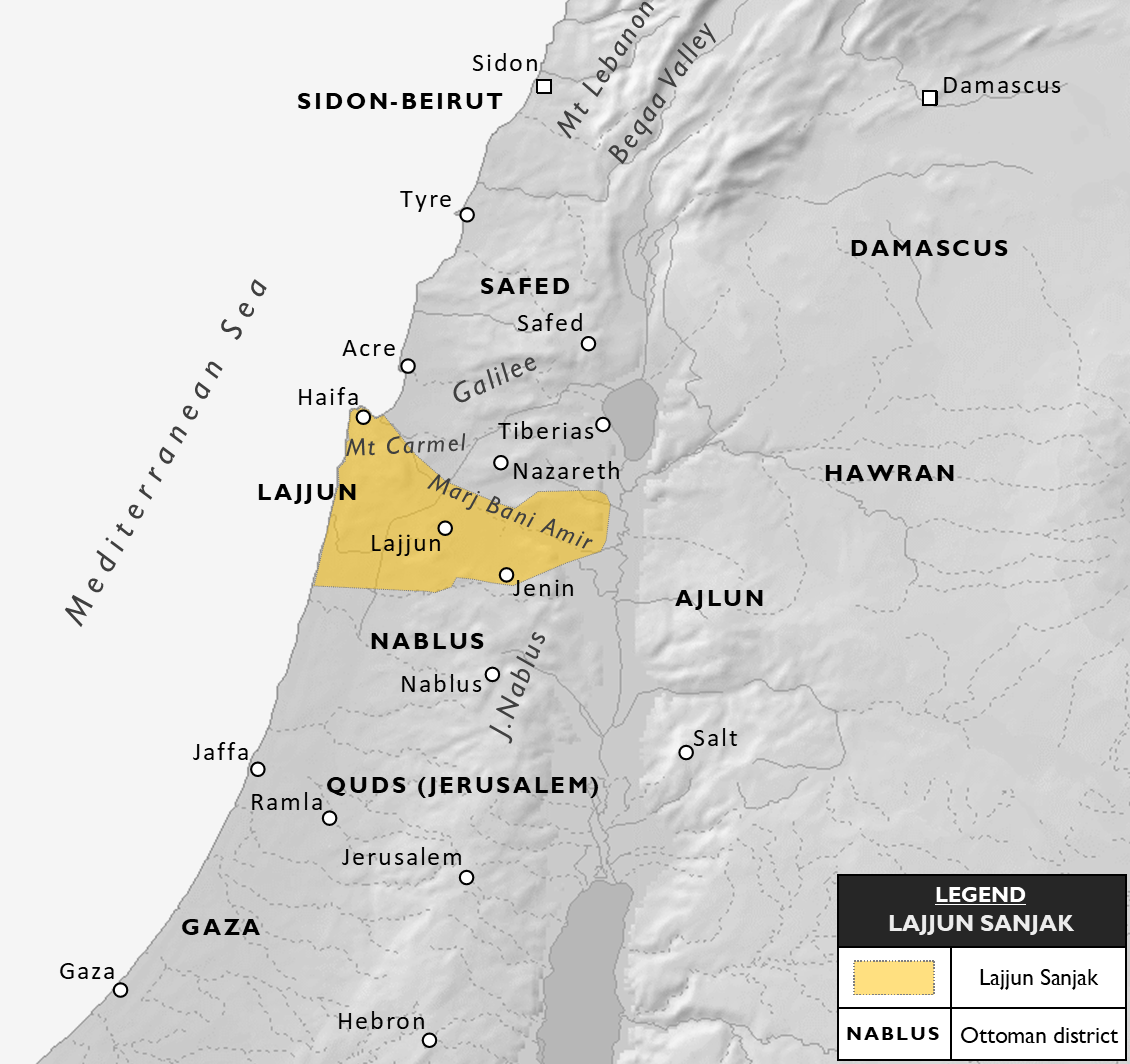
- Map of Lajjun Sanjak, the territory governed by the Turabay dynasty for most of the 16th and 17th centuries
- Country: Ottoman Empire
- Founded: Late 15th century
- Founder: Turabay al-Harithi
- Final ruler: Yusuf Bey
- Titles: Sanjak-bey of Lajjun; Amir al-darbayn (lit. 'commander of the two roads')
- Dissolution: 1677

The Turabay dynasty (Arabic: آل طرباي, romanized: Āl Ṭurabāy) was a Bedouin family of emirs in northern Palestine who served as the multazims (tax farmers) and sanjak-beys (district governors) of Lajjun Sanjak during Ottoman rule in the 16th–17th centuries. The sanjak (district) spanned the towns of Lajjun, Jenin and Haifa, and the surrounding countryside. The progenitors of the family had served as chiefs of Marj Ibn Amer (the Plain of Esdraelon or Jezreel Valley) under the Egypt-based Mamluks in the late 15th century.

During the conquest of the Levant and Egypt by the Ottoman Empire in 1516–1517, the Turabay chief Qaraja and his son Turabay aided the forces of Ottoman Sultan Selim I. The Ottomans kept them in their Mamluk-era role as guardians of the strategic Via Maris and Damascus–Jerusalem highways and rewarded them with tax farms in northern Palestine. Their territory became a sanjak in 1559 and Turabay's son Ali became its first governor. His brother Assaf was appointed in 1573, serving for ten years before being dismissed and exiled to Rhodes for involvement in a rebellion. His nephew Turabay was appointed in 1589 and remained in office until his death in 1601. His son and successor Ahmad, the most prominent chief of the dynasty, ruled Lajjun for nearly a half-century and repulsed attempts by the powerful Druze chief and Ottoman governor of Sidon-Beirut and Safed, Fakhr al-Din Ma'n, to take over Lajjun and Nablus in the 1620s. He consolidated the family's alliance with the Ridwan and Farrukh governing dynasties of Gaza and Nablus, which remained intact until the dynasties' demise toward the end of the century.

As multazims and sanjak-beys the Turabays were entrusted with collecting taxes for the Ottomans, quelling local rebellions, acting as judges, and securing roads. They were largely successful in these duties, while keeping good relations with the peasantry and the village chiefs of the sanjak. Although in the 17th century several of their emirs lived in the towns of Lajjun and Jenin, the Turabays largely preserved their nomadic way of life, pitching camp with their Banu Haritha tribesmen near Caesarea in the winters and the plain of Acre in the summers. The eastward migration of the Banu Haritha to the Jordan Valley, Ottoman centralization drives, and diminishing tax revenues brought about their political decline and they were permanently stripped of office in 1677. Members of the family remained in Jenin at the close of the 17th century, and descendants continue to live in present-day northern Israel and Palestine.

== History ==
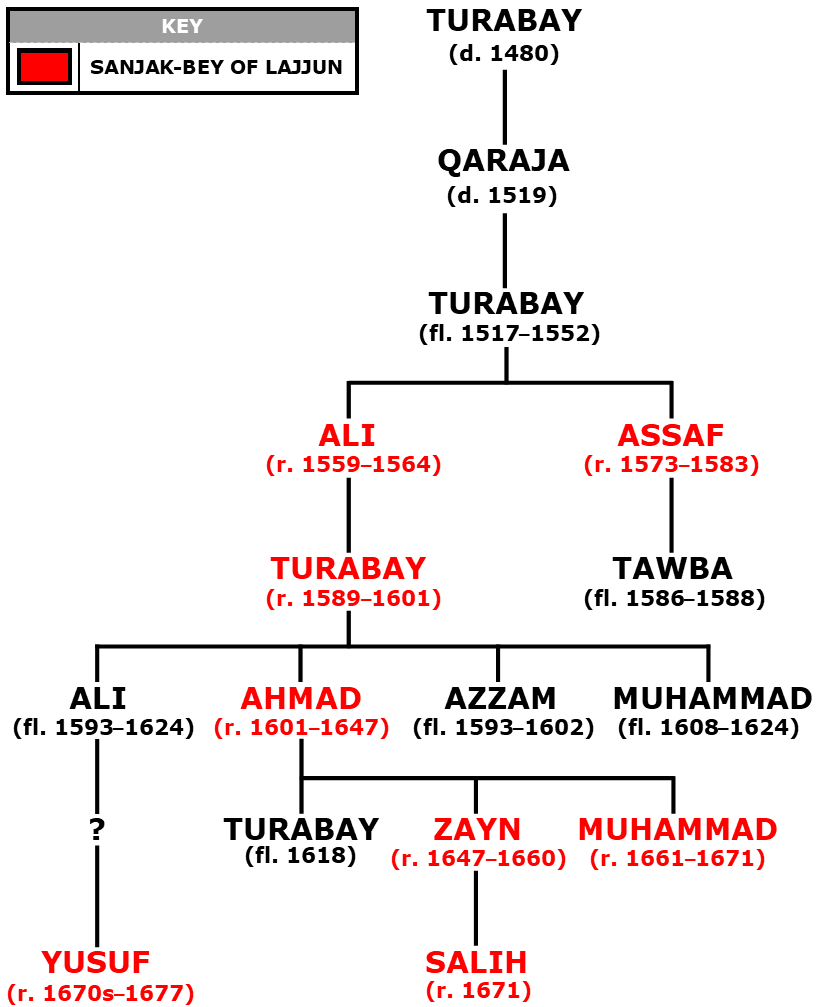
Family tree of the Turabay dynasty, with sanjak-beys of Lajjun highlighted in red

The Turabays were the preeminent house of the Bedouin Banu Haritha tribe, a branch of the Sinbis, (Note: In the 11th century the Sinbis tribe was brought to Egypt from Deir al-Balah (in the present-day Gaza Strip) by the Fatimid vizier Abu Muhammad al-Yazuri in a bid to end its state of rebellion against the Fatimid governor of Gaza. They lived in the Buhayra province in the Nile Delta during the Ayyubid (1174–1250) and Mamluk (1250–1517) periods. Their power was dealt a serious blow in a Mamluk campaign against them in 1253.) which itself stemmed from the large, ancient tribe of Tayy. During Mamluk rule in Palestine (1260s–1516), the Haritha were mentioned as living in Jenin and its environs by the 13th-century historian Ibn Fadlallah al-Umari. In the 1390s, the emir of the Haritha backed the rebel governor Mintash of Syria against Sultan Barquq of Egypt with 1,000 iron-clad horsemen. In the chaotic aftermath of Timur's invasion of Syria in 1400-1401, the Haritha emir confiscated the grain harvest of Mamlakat Safad (the province of Safed), leading to clashes that ended with Mamluk army fatalities. Sultan an-Nasir Faraj appeased the emir with a khila' (robe of honor) but captured him in a ruse the next year and had him executed. The Mamluks co-opted the Haritha and the muqaddam (commander) of the tribe led a contingent of his warriors in the Mamluk army encamped in Safed in 1419-1420.

In the late 15th century, Turabay, the eponymous progenitor of the dynasty, is mentioned as the emir of the Haritha and oversaw the Marj Ibn Amer plain (commonly known today as the Jezreel Valley), an amal (subdistrict) of Mamlakat Safad. By this time, the Haritha had long dominated the regions of Marj Ibn Amer and northern Jabal Nablus (Samaria), which collectively became referred to in Arabic as bilad al-Haritha (lit. 'lands of the Haritha'). (Note: As late as the 19th century, the area north of Nablus was called the district of Haritha while the Marj Ibn Amer and the area around Beisan formed the district of Haritha al-Shamaliya (the northern lands of the Haritha).) Turabay was executed by the Mamluk authorities in 1480 and replaced with his son Qaraja.

=== Early relations with the Ottomans ===
In 1516 the Ottoman sultan Selim I (r. 1512–1520) launched an invasion of the Mamluk empire. After the Ottomans routed the Mamluks at the Battle of Marj Dabiq, Qaraja made contact with Selim. Qaraja's son Turabay joined Selim's forces and participated in the subsequent conquest of Mamluk Egypt. On 8 February 1517, after his victory over the Mamluks, Selim wrote to Qaraja from Cairo, ordering him to capture Mamluk officials fleeing Egypt, transfer captive commanders to the sultan, and execute regular soldiers. On 2 February 1518, Qaraja paid homage to Selim in Damascus, where the sultan had stopped on his return to the imperial capital Constantinople.

The Ottomans' most significant challenge in governing the Levant became the subjugation of the region's eastern desert and western mountainous peripheries. Selim entrusted the Turabays and the Beqaa Valley-based Bedouin Hanash emirs with the pacification of Bedouin tribes and the security of the Hajj pilgrimage route, which passed through the Syrian desert leading to the Hejaz (western Arabia, where Mecca is located). Qaraja held the title of amir al-darbayn (lit. 'commander of the two roads'), highlighting his role as the protector of the Via Maris, the Mediterranean coastal road between Cairo and Damascus which cut through Marj Ibn Amer, and the road connecting Damascus to Jerusalem via Jenin and Nablus. In the Ottoman provincial system the part of Marj Ibn Amer around the Daughters of Jacob Bridge remained under Safed's direct administration in the newly formed Safed Sanjak of Damascus Eyalet; much of the original amal, along with the coastal amal of Atlit, was administered separately as the 'Iqta of Turabay'. (Note: The iqta was a common form of land tenure during the medieval Islamic period, including during Mamluk rule. It was equivalent to the Ottoman timar, whose holder was allocated the revenue of the land for a limited period.) The area's separation from Safed Sanjak was done to reward or pacify the Turabays. (Note: Early 16th-century Ottoman tax documents record that fifty-one households of the Banu Haritha were encamped near the Daughters of Jacob Bridge.)

The Ottoman beylerbey (provincial governor) of Damascus, Janbirdi al-Ghazali, captured and executed Qaraja in 1519, along with three Bedouin chiefs from the area of Nablus. The execution was likely connected to an earlier attack by Bedouin tribesmen against a Muslim pilgrim caravan returning to Damascus from the Hajj in Mecca. After the death of Selim in 1520, Janbirdi revolted and declared himself sultan. Under the leadership of Turabay, the family fought alongside the Ottomans against the rebels. According to the historian Muhammad Adnan Bakhit, this demonstrated the family's loyalty to the Ottomans. The historian Abdul-Rahim Abu-Husayn suggests additional motivations for their fight against Janbirdi, including the latter's support from the Gaza and Ramla-area rival Bedouin tribes of Banu Ata, Banu Atiyya and the Sawalim, the family's grudge against Janbirdi for executing Qaraja, and bribes by the governor of Egypt, Khair Bey. With the suppression of Janbirdi's revolt in 1521, Turabay gained the confidence of the Ottomans. He was entrusted in 1530/31 with overseeing the construction of the Ukhaydir fort in the Hejaz on the Hajj route. A further testament to Ottoman favor was Turabay's large iltizam (tax farm), which spanned several subdistricts in the sanjaks of Safed, Damascus and Ajlun, the revenues of which amounted to 516,855 akçes. (Note: Turabay ibn Qaraja's iltizam spanned the subdistricts of Qaqun, Marj Ibn Amer and the Ghawr, Banu Kinana, Banu Atika and Banu Juhma, at the time located in the sanjaks of Safed, Ajlun and Damascus. His uncle Budah and son Sab' held timars (fiefs) in the subdistricts of Acre in 1533–1536 and Tiberias in 1533–1539, respectively.)

There may have been tensions between Turabay and Sinan Pasha al-Tuwashi, the beylerbey of Damascus in 1545–1548, and the latter's successors. In 1552 the Turabays were accused of rebellion for acquiring illegal firearms and the authorities warned the sanjak-beys (sanjak governors) of Damascus Eyalet to prohibit their subjects dealings with the family. A nephew of Turabay was sent to Damascus to secure a pardon for the family. The information about this event is unclear, and the motivation for the purported rebellion unknown. The Sublime Porte (Ottoman imperial government) ordered the beylerbey of Damascus to punish the family and Turabay may have been killed as a consequence.

=== Early governors of Lajjun ===
The Iqta of Turabay was transformed into a sanjak, called Lajjun Sanjak after its center, Lajjun, in 1559. Turabay's son Ali was appointed its sanjak-bey, becoming the first member of the family to hold the office. Under his leadership, the Turabays once again entered into a state of rebellion by acquiring firearms and Ali was replaced by an imperial official, Kemal Bey, in 1564. Three years later the Porte ordered the arrest and imprisonment of a member of the family for stockpiling arms.

Ali was succeeded as head of the family by his brother Assaf, who worked to reconcile with the Ottomans by demonstrating his obedience to the Porte. He allied with the sanjak-bey of Gaza, Ridwan Pasha, who lobbied on his behalf to the Porte, writing that Assaf safeguarded the road between Cairo and Damascus. The Porte responded in 1571 that if he continued to be obedient he would be granted the sultan's favor. Two years later he was appointed sanjak-bey of Lajjun. As well as Lajjun, in 1579, Assaf requested the governorship of Nablus, promising to pay the sanjak's tax arrears and build a watchtower between Qaqun and Jaljulia to secure that part of the highway from brigands. The Porte denied his request, wary of his growing strength in the region.

Assaf was dismissed in 1583. The information about his dismissal is inconsistent in the Ottoman government records. One version is that Arab tribes in northern Palestine were in a state of rebellion at the time and the authorities believed Assaf was involved in their revolt. The historian Moshe Sharon posits that Assaf had become intolerably powerful to the Porte. At an unspecified point after his dismissal, he was exiled to Rhodes but was allowed to return in 1589. In an alternative version, he went into hiding and his son was exiled and the two were pardoned in 1589. In any case, Assaf was not reinstated as sanjak-bey.

During his absence, an impostor, referred to in Ottoman documents as "ʿAssāf the Liar", had gained control of the sanjak. He went to Damascus to lobby its beylerbey, Muhammad Pasha, to legalize his rule. Despite Muhammad Pasha's support, Assaf the Liar was arrested and executed on the orders of the Porte in October 1590. The Porte then appointed a member of the Turabay family, Turabay ibn Ali, as sanjak-bey. The latter was a nephew of the actual Assaf, who lodged an unsuccessful complaint against Turabay in March 1592 for allegedly seizing from Assaf 150,000 coins, 300 camels and 2,500 calves. According to Abu-Husayn, Turabay demonstrated "a special capability" and the Ottomans had "confidence" in him. In 1594 he served as a temporary replacement for the sanjak-bey of Gaza, Ahmad Pasha ibn Ridwan, while the latter was away leading the Hajj pilgrim caravan and continued to govern Lajjun until his death in 1601. By this time, the Banu Haritha's dwelling areas spanned the coastal plain of Palestine around Qaqun to Kafr Kanna in the Lower Galilee and the surrounding hinterland.

=== Governorship of Ahmad ===
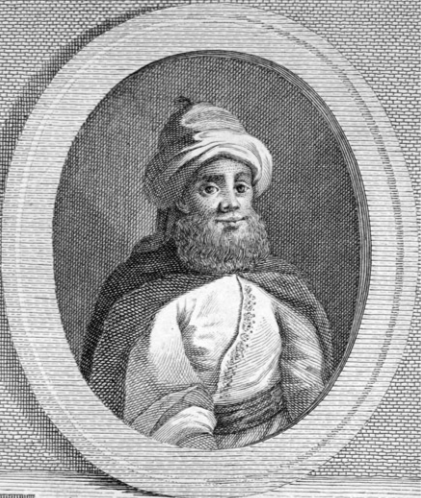
The Druze strongman, multazim and sanjak-bey Fakhr al-Din Ma'n

Turabay was succeeded as sanjak-bey of Lajjun by his son Ahmad Bey, the "greatest leader" of the dynasty, according to Sharon. (Note: Ahmad and his brother Ali Bey had already been joint holders of ziamet (land grants) worth 20,000 akçes in the Atlit subdistrict from 1593.) Five years after Ahmad took office, the Druze emir Fakhr al-Din Ma'n became governor of neighboring Safed. Fakhr al-Din had already been in control of the ports of Sidon and Beirut, and southern Mount Lebanon as the sanjak-bey of Sidon-Beirut; with the appointment to Safed, his control was extended to the port of Acre and the Galilee. Abu-Husayn notes that "this had the effect of bringing the two chiefs, as immediate neighbors, into direct confrontation with one another". During the rebellion of Ali Janbulad, a Kurdish chief and governor of Aleppo, and Fakhr al-Din against the Ottomans in Syria in 1606, Ahmad generally remained neutral. However, he welcomed the supreme commander of the Ottoman forces in the region, Yusuf Sayfa, in Haifa after the rebels ousted him from Tripoli. Janbulad demanded Ahmad execute Yusuf, but he refused, and Yusuf made his way to Damascus. Later, Ahmad ignored summons to join the imperial army of Grand Vizier Murad Pasha, who suppressed the rebellion in 1607. Interested in weakening his powerful neighbor to the north, Ahmad joined the government campaign of Hafiz Ahmed Pasha against Fakhr al-Din and his Ma'n dynasty in Mount Lebanon in 1613–1614, which prompted the Druze chief's flight to Europe.

Upon his pardon and return in 1618, Fakhr al-Din pursued an expansionist policy, making conflict between him and the Turabays "inevitable", according to Abu-Husayn. Initially, Ahmad dispatched his son Turabay with a present of horses to welcome back Fakhr al-Din. When Fakhr al-Din and his kethuda (aide) Mustafa were appointed to the sanjaks of Ajlun and Nablus, respectively, in 1622, Ahmad's brother-in-law, a resident of Nablus Sanjak called Shaykh Asi, refused to recognize the new governor. Ahmad provided refuge to the peasants who fled the Nablus area and Shia Muslim rural chieftains who fled Safed Sanjak, to the chagrin of Fakhr al-Din and Mustafa. Ahmad and Mustafa fought for the village of Qabatiya, which laid between the Nablus and Lajjun sanjaks, and the surrounding farms. Reinforcements sent to Mustafa were defeated by the villagers of Nablus Sanjak.

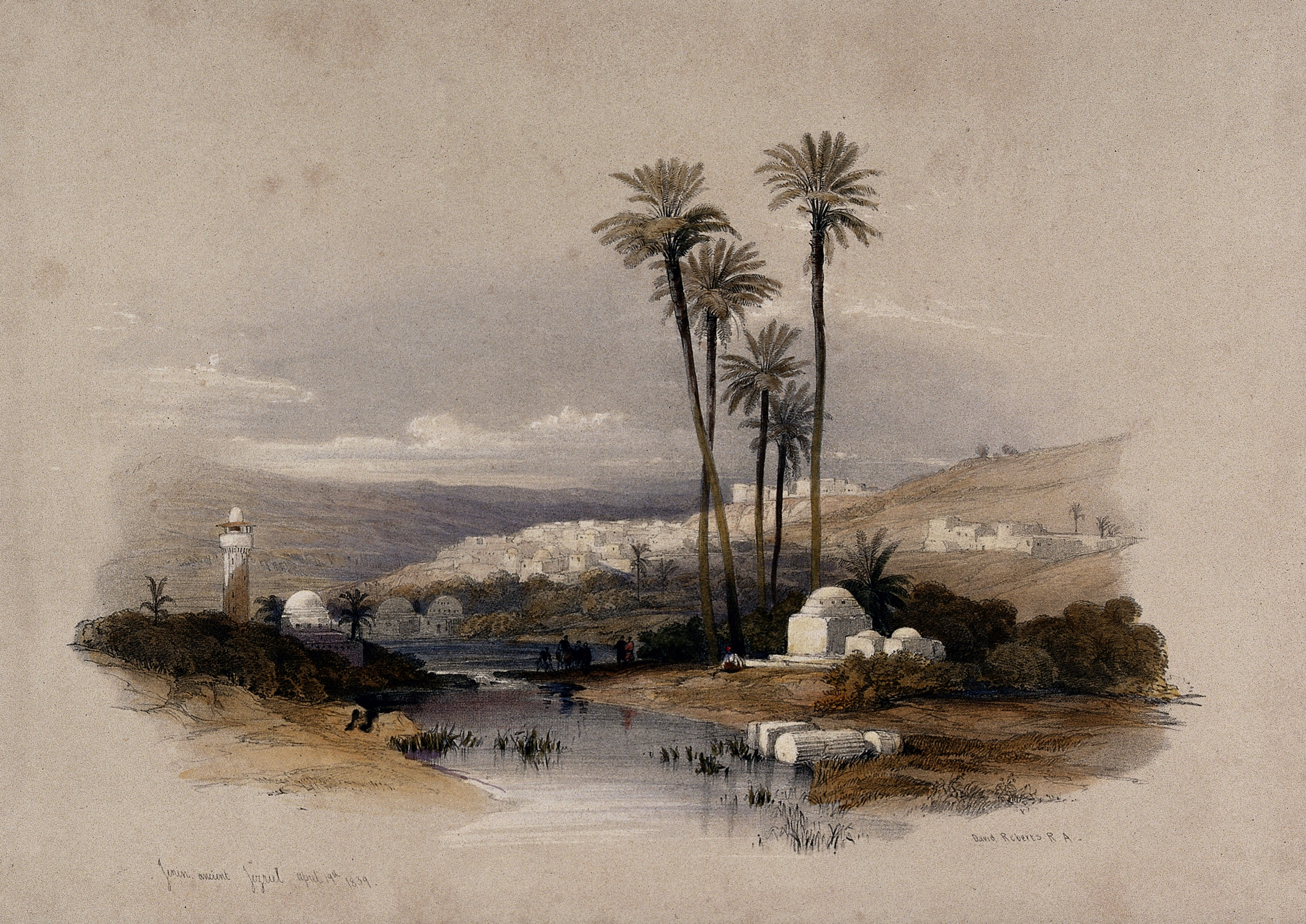
Jenin (painted in 1839) was captured by Fakhr al-Din in 1623. Ahmad recaptured the town the following year and established his residence there.

When Fakhr al-Din and his proxies were dismissed from the sanjaks of Safed, Ajlun and Nablus in 1623, Ahmad backed their replacements Bashir Qansuh in Ajlun and Muhammad ibn Farrukh in Nablus. Starting in the 16th century, the Turabays had developed a military, economic and marital alliance with the Farrukhs of Nablus and the Ridwans of Gaza. Ahmad's granddaughter (unnamed in the sources) was wed to Muhammad ibn Farrukh to consolidate their families' alliance in the lead-up to their confrontation against Fakhr al-Din in 1623. (Note: The historian Dror Ze'evi speculates the child of this marriage was the future head of the Farrukhs and sanjak-bey of Nablus, Assaf Farrukh.) The extensive ties between the three ruling families practically made them "one extended family", according to the historian Dror Ze'evi. Through these inter-dynastic alliances, the influence of the Turabays extended across Palestine and Transjordan. Fakhr al-Din responded to the Turabays' support for his replacements by dispatching troops to capture the tower of Haifa and burn villages in Mount Carmel, both places in Ahmad's jurisdiction which were hosting Shia refugees from Safed Sanjak. At the head of an army of sekban mercenaries, (Note: Sekbans were the third-tier division of the corps of the janissaries until being outlawed by the Ottoman imperial government in 1596. They afterward became a key component in the private armies of local chieftains in the Levant during the 17th century.) Fakhr al-Din captured Jenin, which he garrisoned, and sent Mustafa back to Nablus. The two sides met in battle at the Awja River, where Ahmad and his local allies defeated Fakhr al-Din and forced his retreat. The Porte expressed its gratitude to Ahmad and his allies by enlarging his land holdings.

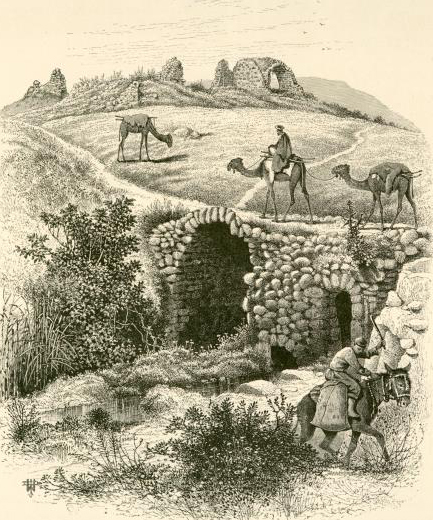
The caravanserai of Lajjun (sketched in 1872), the initial center of the eponymous sanjak governed by the Turabays

Fakhr al-Din soon after had to contend with a campaign by Mustafa Pasha, the beylerbey of Damascus, allowing Ahmad to clear Lajjun Sanjak of the residual Ma'nid presence. To that end, his brother Ali recaptured the tower of Haifa, killed the commander of the Ma'nid sekbans there, and raided the plain around Acre. Fakhr al-Din defeated and captured Mustafa Pasha in the Battle of Anjar later that year and extracted from the beylerbey the appointment of his son Mansur as sanjak-bey of Lajjun. Nonetheless, the Ma'nids could not gain control there, even after recapturing the tower of Haifa in May/June 1624. Ahmad sued for peace with Fakhr al-Din, but the latter offered him deputy control of the sanjak and conditioned it on Ahmad's submission to Fakhr al-Din in person; Ahmad ignored the offer. Later that month Ahmad and his ally Muhammad ibn Farrukh defeated Fakhr al-Din in battle and shortly after dislodged the Ma'nid sekbans stationed in Jenin. At the end of June, Ahmad took up residence in the town. He then sent his Bedouin forces to raid the plain of Acre.

Afterward, Ahmad and Fakhr al-Din reached an agreement stipulating the withdrawal of Ma'nid troops from the tower of Haifa, an end to Bedouin raids against Safed Sanjak, and the establishment of peaceful relations; afterward "communication between bilad [the lands of Banu] Haritha and bilad Safad was resumed", according to the contemporary local historian al-Khalidi al-Safadi. Ahmad had the tower of Haifa demolished to avoid a future Ma'nid takeover. According to Sharon, the Turabays' victories against the Ma'n "compelled" Fakhr al-Din "to abandon his plans for subjecting northern Palestine"; Bakhit stated that Fakhr al-Din's retreat from Turabay territory to confront the governor of Damascus at Anjar "rescued him from probable destruction at the hands of Aḥmad Ṭarabāy". The Ottomans captured Fakhr al-Din during a campaign against him in 1633. One of his nephews who survived the campaign, Mulhim, was given refuge by Ahmad. Upon learning of Fakhr al-Din's capture and the death of Mulhim's father Yunus, Ahmad arranged for one of his kethudas to surrender Mulhim to the authorities in Damascus, but Mulhim escaped.

Ahmad was dismissed as sanjak-bey in May 1640 for his role in a rebellion, but reappointed in the same year. He remained in office until his death in 1647. At different times during his governorship, his brothers Azzam and Muhammad and son Zayn Bey held timars and ziamets (both being types of imperial land grants) in Lajjun Sanjak's subdistricts of Atlit, Shara and Shafa.

=== Later chiefs and downfall ===
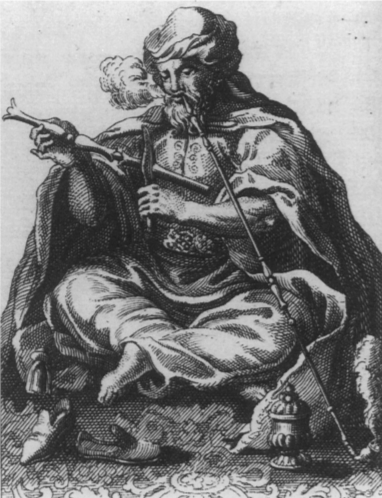
The Turabay emir Muhammad Bey in 1664, by Laurent d'Arvieux

Ahmad's son Zayn succeeded him as sanjak-bey and held office until his death in 1660. In Sharon's summarization, both the French diplomat Laurent d'Arvieux (d. 1702) and the local historian al-Muhibbi (d. 1699) described Zayn as "courageous, wise and modest". His brother and successor Muhammad Bey was described by d'Arvieux as a dreamy chief heavily addicted to hashish. The fortunes of the family began to deteriorate under his leadership, though he continued to successfully perform his duties as sanjak-bey, protecting the roads and helping suppress a peasants' revolt in Nablus Sanjak. D'Arvieux was dispatched by the French consul of Sidon in August 1664 to request Muhammad facilitate the reestablishment of Carmelite Order monks in Mount Carmel. Muhammad befriended d'Arvieux, who afterward served as his secretary for Arabic and Turkish correspondences while Muhammad's usual secretary was ill. Muhammad died on 1 October 1671 and was buried in Jenin.

Throughout the late 17th century the Porte, having eliminated the power of Fakhr al-Din, who "had reduced Ottoman authority in Syria to a mere shadow" in the words of Abu-Husayn, embarked on a centralization drive in the western sanjaks of Damascus Eyalet to suppress the power of local chiefs. (Note: There is no official Ottoman record of this centralization drive and Ze'evi concedes that although such a campaign is apparent from local and European sources, information is "largely circumstantial and based on conjecture".) The Porte had become increasingly concerned with the local dynasties due to diminishing tax revenues from their sanjaks and the loss of control of the Hajj caravan routes. The Turabays, Ridwans and Farrukhs considered Palestine their collective fiefdom and resisted imperial attempts to weaken their control, while being careful not to openly rebel against the Porte. High-ranking officers, sanjak-beys from outside Syria, and family members of the imperial elite were gradually appointed to the sanjaks of Damascus Eyalet. This proved challenging in the case of the Turabays in Lajjun; their chiefs were occasionally replaced but by dint of their dominance of the sanjak quickly regained office. With the imprisonment and execution of the Ridwan governor of Gaza, Husayn Pasha, in 1662/63, and the mysterious death of the sanjak-bey of Nablus, Assaf Farrukh, on his way to Constantinople in 1670/71, the alliance of the three dynasties was fatally weakened.

The Turabays' position declined further with Muhammad's death. His nephews succeeded him as sanjak-bey for relatively short stints: Salih Bey, the son of Zayn, ruled until he was succeeded by his cousin Yusuf Bey, the son of Ali. Yusuf was dismissed in 1677 and replaced by an Ottoman officer, Ahmed Pasha al-Tarazi, who was also appointed to other sanjaks in Palestine; "the [Ottoman] government had abandoned them", in al-Muhibbi's words. The Turabays' governorship of Lajjun thus ended and the family "ceased to be a ruling power", according to Bakhit. Sharon attributes the decline of the Turabays to the eastward migration of their power base, the Banu Haritha, to the Jordan Valley and the Ajlun region in the late 17th century. The Turabays were politically replaced in northern Palestine by the originally Bedouin Zayadina of Daher al-Umar.

Sharon notes that "the memory of the Turabays was completely erased with their fall". Although dispossessed of their government, the Turabays remained in the sanjak. The emirs of the dynasty were visited in Jenin in 1689 by the Sufi traveler Abd al-Ghani al-Nabulsi, who wrote that "They are now in eclipse." Descendants of the family in Tulkarm were known as the 'Tarabih' and formed part of the Fuqaha clan, a collective of several families genealogically unrelated to each other. The Fuqaha were the religious scholarly elite of Tulkarm in the 17th–19th centuries. Branches of the family continue to live in Tulkarm, as well as in Sakhnin, Shefa-Amr and the Sinai Peninsula.

== Governance ==
As multazims the Turabays were responsible for collecting taxes in their jurisdiction on behalf of the Porte. They designated a sheikh (chief) in each village in the sanjak to collect taxes from the peasants. The village sheikhs paid the Turabay emirs based on the harvest. In return, the lives and properties of the village chiefs were defended by the Turabays. In the words of Sharon, the Turabays "developed good and effective relations with the sedentary population". The annual revenues forwarded to the emir in the late 17th century amounted to about 100,000 piasters (equivalent to 1,200,000 akçes), a relatively small amount.

The Turabays levied customs on the European ships which occasionally docked in the harbors of Haifa and Tantura. Both ports were also used by the Turabays for their own imports, including coffee, vegetables, rice and cloth. The revenues derived from Haifa ranged from 1,000 akçes in 1538 to 10,000 akçes in 1596; the combined revenues of Tantura, Tirat al-Luz (on Mount Carmel) and Atlit were 5,000 akçes in 1538. The early Turabay governors did not invest in securing or building Haifa, which became a haven for Maltese pirates. Due to attacks by both the pirates and the Turabay governors and the conflict between the Turabays and Fakhr al-Din, European merchants avoided trading in Haifa. To attract French merchants to the port, in 1631, Ahmad Turabay began to rebuild and resettle Haifa and permitted the Carmelites to construct houses there.

The Turabays were responsible for ensuring the safety of the sanjak's roads for traveling merchants and the imperial post, and suppressing local rebellions. Their success in guarding the roads was frequently acknowledged in Ottoman government documents where their chiefs are referred to by their Mamluk-era title amir al-darbayn. The Turabay emirs ignored their official duty as sanjak-beys to participate in imperial wars upon demand, but they generally remained loyal to the Ottomans in Syria, including during the peak of Fakhr al-Din's power. The Turabays' army was composed of their tribesmen, whose group solidarity stood in contrast to the sekbans of Fakhr al-Din who fought for pay; the Turabays' battlefield successes against the latter were likely owed to their tribal power base. At the time of d'Arvieux's visit, Muhammad Turabay could field an army of 4,000–5,000 Bedouin warriors.

The Sunni Muslim faith of the Turabays also helped secure the favor of the Sunni Muslim Ottoman state. Assaf built a mosque in Tirat Luza in 1579/80, which contained an inscription bearing his name ("Emir Assaf ibn Nimr Bey"). The family's emirs may have served as the qadis (Islamic head judges) of the sanjak, at least in the case of Muhammad Turabay. D'Arvieux noted that Muhammad rarely ordered death sentences.

== Way of life ==
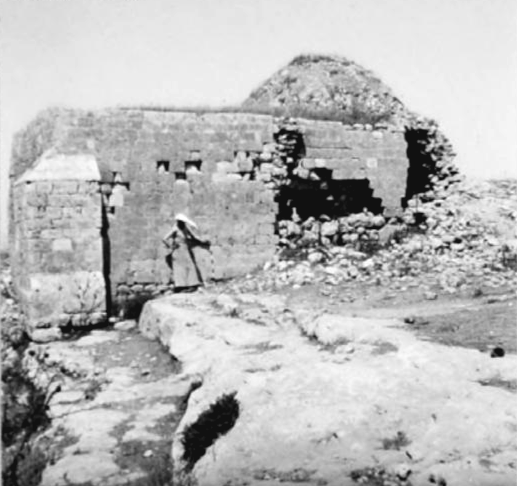
The ruined mausoleum of Turabay ibn Ali (d. 1601) in Jenin in 1941. The mausoleum no longer exists.

The Turabays retained their Bedouin way of life, living in tents among their Banu Haritha tribesmen. In the summers they encamped along the Na'aman River near Acre and in the winters they encamped near Caesarea. D'Arvieux noted that their chiefs could have resided in palaces, but chose not to; they remained nomadic out of pride. Although they retained their nomadic tents, by the 17th century they also established residences in the towns of Lajjun and Jenin. According to Sharon, the Turabays "introduced two innovations" to their traditional way of life "as a mark of their official status": the employment of a secretary to handle their correspondences and the use of a military band (composed of tambourines, oboes, drums and trumpets). The family, and the Banu Haritha in general, were mainly dependent on livestock for their source of living. Their main assets were their horses, camels, cattle, goats, sheep and grain.

The family designated Jenin as the administrative headquarters of the sanjak and buried their dead in the town's Izz al-Din cemetery. Turabay ibn Ali was the first emir of the family to be buried in a mausoleum, later known as Qubbat al-Amir Turabay (Dome of Amir Turabay). The building was the only grave of the Turabays to have survived into the 20th century and no longer exists today. It was described by a British Mandatory antiquities inspector in 1941 as a ruined domed chamber housing the tombstone of the emir with a two-line inscription reading:

Basmalah [in the name of God]. This is the tomb of the slave who is in need of his Lord, the Exalted, al-Amir Turabay b. Ali. The year 1010 AH [i.e. 1601 CE].

== Assessment ==
The Turabay emirs oversaw a period of relative peace and stability in northern Palestine during their rule. According to Abu-Husayn, they maintained the favor of the Ottomans by "properly attending to the administrative and guard duties assigned to them" and served as an "example of a dynasty of Bedouin chiefs who managed to perpetuate their control over a given region". They stood in contrast to their Bedouin contemporaries, the Furaykhs of the Beqaa Valley, who used initial imperial favor to enrich themselves at the expense of the proper governance of their territory. As a result of their administrative success, military strength, and loyalty to the Porte, the Turabays were one of the few local dynasties to maintain their rule throughout the 16th and 17th centuries. The historian William Harris notes that the Turabay emirs, along with Fakhr al-Din and the chiefs of other local governing dynasties were part of a group of late 16th–early 17th-century Levantine "super chiefs ... serviceable for the Ottoman pursuit of 'divide and rule' ... They could war among themselves and even with the governor of Damascus ... but were in deep trouble if the Ottomans became agitated about revenue or loyalty".

== See also ==
- Jarm, the principal Bedouin auxiliaries of Palestine during the Mamluk period, active in the region's south

== Bibliography ==
- Abu-Husayn, Abdul-Rahim (1985). Provincial Leaderships in Syria, 1575–1650. Beirut: American University of Beirut. ISBN 9780815660729.
- Al-Salim, Farid [in Arabic] (2015). Palestine and the Decline of the Ottoman Empire: Modernization and the Path to Palestinian Statehood. London and New York: I. B. Tauris. ISBN 978-1-78076-456-6.
- Bakhit, Muhammad Adnan Salamah (February 1972). The Ottoman Province of Damascus in the Sixteenth Century (PhD). School of Oriental and African Studies, University of London. S2CID 190680221.
- D'Arvieux, Laurent (1718). The Chevalier d'Arvieux's Travels in Arabia the Desart. London: B. Barker, C. King and J. Brown.
- Fadl Hassan, Yusuf (1973). The Arabs and the Sudan: From the Seventh to the Early Sixteenth Century. Khartoum: Khartoum University Press.
- Harris, William (2012). Lebanon: A History, 600–2011. New York: Oxford University Press. ISBN 978-0-19-518-111-1.
- Heyd, Uriel (1960). Ottoman Documents on Palestine, 1552–1615. Oxford: Oxford University Press. ISBN 978-0-598-39394-4. OCLC 2585530.
- Hourani, Alexander [in Greek] (2010). New Documents on the History of Mount Lebanon and Arabistan in the 10th and 11th Centuries H. Beirut: Alexander Hourani.
- Marom, Roy; Tepper, Yotam; Adams, Matthew J. Adams (2023). "Lajjun: Forgotten Provincial Capital in Ottoman Palestine". Levant. 55 (2): 218–241. doi:10.1080/00758914.2023.2202484.
- Mülinen, E. Graf von [in German] (1908). "Beiträge zur Kenntis des Karmels (Contributions to the Knowledge of Mount Carmel)". Zeitschrift des Deutschen Palästina-Vereins (in German). 31: 1–258.
- Rapoport, Yossef (2025). Becoming Arab: The Formation of Arab Identity in the Medieval Middle East. Princeton: Princeton University Press. ISBN 9780691210636.
- Rhode, Harold (1979). The Administration and Population of the Sancak of Safad in the Sixteenth Century (PhD thesis). Columbia University.
- Robinson, Edward; Smith, Eli (1841). Biblical Researches in Palestine, Mount Sinai and Arabia Petraea: A Journal of Travels in the year 1838, Volume III. Boston: Crocker & Brewster.
- Saleh, Abdel Hamid (December 1980). "Le rôle des bédouins d'Egypte à l'époque Fatimide (The Role of the Bedouins of Egypt during the Fatimid Era)". Rivista degli studi orientali (in French). 54 (1): 51–65. JSTOR 41880233.
- Sato, Tsugitaka [in Japanese] (1997). State and Rural Society in Medieval Islam: Sultans, Muqta's, and Fallahun. Leiden and New York: Brill. ISBN 90-04-10649-9.
- Sharon, Moshe (1975). "The Political Role of the Bedouins in Palestine in the Sixteenth and Seventeenth Centuries". In Ma'oz, Moshe (ed.). Studies on Palestine During the Ottoman Period. Jerusalem: The Magnes Press. ISBN 978-965-223-589-3. OCLC 2298443.
- Sharon, Moshe (2017). Corpus Inscriptionum Arabicarum Palaestinae, Volume Six: J (1). Leiden and Boston: Brill. ISBN 978-90-04-32479-4.
- Sirriyeh, Elizabeth (1984). "The Memoires of a French Gentleman in Syria: Chevalier Laurent d'Arvieux (1635-1702)". British Society for Middle Eastern Studies. 11 (2): 125–139. doi:10.1080/13530198408705395. JSTOR 194915.
- Winter, Stefan (2010). The Shiites of Lebanon under Ottoman Rule, 1516–1788. Cambridge: Cambridge University Press. ISBN 978-1-1394-8681-1.
- Yazbak, Mahmoud (1998). Haifa in the Late Ottoman Period, 1864–1914: A Muslim Town in Transition. Leiden, Boston and Köln: Brill. ISBN 90-04-11051-8.
- Ze'evi, Dror (1996). An Ottoman Century: The District of Jerusalem in the 1600s. Albany: State University of New York Press. ISBN 0-7914-2915-6.
