= List of rulers of Gaza =

The following is a list of rulers of Gaza. During Mamluk and early Ottoman rule, Gaza served as the capital of a province which at times included most of central and southern Palestine or the coastal plain up to Jaffa.

== Ancient Egyptian ==
- Addaya (c. 1350 BC)

== Kingdoms of Philistia ==
- Hanunu (c. 734 BC)
- Sil-Bel (c. 701-669 BC)

== Achaemenid ==
- Batis (d. 332 BCE)

== Herodian kingdom ==
- Costobarus (d. c. 27-25 BC)

== Ayyubids ==
- Nasir al-Din (1244–1245)

== Mamluks ==
- Shams el-Din al-Barli (1259–1264)
- Baybars al-Ala'i (1307–1309)
- Baktamur (1310–1311)
- Sanjar al-Jawli (1311–1320)
- Muhammad ibn Baktamur (1320–1329)
- Turuntay al-Jukandari (1329–1332)
- Taynal al-Ashrafi (1332–1335)
- Sanjar al-Jawli (1342)
- Ahmad al-Hajji (1373–1375)
- Muhammad al-Adili (1375)
- Akbugha al-Safawi (1375–1381)
- Husam ad-Din Bakish (1382)
- Aqbugha al-Tulutumari (?-1398)
- Sayf ad-Din Inal al-Ala'i (1428–1433)
- Timraz al-Mu'ayyadi (ca 1436–1437)
- Yalkhuja an-Nasiri (1445–1446)
- Sibay az-Zahiri (ca. 1482)
- Aqbay al-Ashrafi (1482–1494)
- Qani Bak (1494–1495)
- Aqbay al-Ashrafi (1495–1496)
- Dawlat Bay (1501–1517)

== Ottoman ==
- Sharaf ad-Din Musa al-Muzaffari (1517–1524)
- Kara Şahin Mustafa (1524–1550)
- Ridwan Pasha (1550–1565)
- Sinan Bey (1565–1567)
- Ridwan Pasha (1567–1572)
- Ahmad ibn Ridwan (1572–1601)
- Hasan Arab Ridwan (1601–1660)
- Husayn Pasha (1660–1663)
- Musa Pasha (1663–1679)
- Ahmad ibn Musa Pasha (1679–1690)
- Sayed Ahmad (1708–1723)
- Salih Pasha Touqan (1723–?)
- Uthman Pasha (1760–1773)
- Zahir al-Umar (1773–1774)
- Suleiman Pasha (1804–1805)
- Muhammad Abu Marraq (1805–1807)
- Muhammad Abu-Nabbut (1807–1818)
- Mustafa Bey (1818–1820)
- Abdullah Pasha (1820–1831)
- Mas'ud al-Madi (1831–1834)
- Mahmud Abd al-Hadi (1849)
- Ahmad Rifaat Bak ash-Sharkasi (ca. 1868)

== See also ==
- History of Gaza

== Bibliography ==
- Doumani, B. (1995). Rediscovering Palestine: Merchants and Peasants in Jabal Nablus 1700–1900. Berkeley, CA: University of California Press. ISBN 0-226-86766-8.
- Filiu, Jean-Pierre (2014). Gaza: A History. Oxford University Press. ISBN 9780190201890.
- Khalidi, W. (1992). All That Remains. Washington DC: Institute for Palestine Studies. ISBN 0-88728-224-5.
- Macalister, R. A. S.; Masterman, E. W. G. (1905). "Occasional Papers on the Modern inhabitants of Palestine, part I & part II". Quarterly Statement - Palestine Exploration Fund. 37: 343–356. doi:10.1179/peq.1905.37.4.343. S2CID 161632875.
- Mattar, P. (2005). Encyclopedia of the Palestinians (Rev. ed.). New York, NY: Facts on File. ISBN 0-8160-5764-8.
- Mayer, L. A. (1933). Saracenic Heraldry: A Survey. Oxford: Oxford University Press.
- Philipp, T. (2001). Acre: The Rise and Fall of a Palestinian City, 1730–1831. New York, NY: Columbia University Press. ISBN 0231123272.
- Sadek, Mohamed-Moain (1991). Die mamlukische Architektur der Stadt Gaza (in German). Klaus Schwarz. doi:10.1515/9783112400968.
- Schölch, A. (1993). Palestine in Transformation, 1856–1882: Studies in Social, Economic and Political Development (PDF). Washington DC: Institute for Palestine Studies. ISBN 0-88728-234-2.
- Sharon, M. (1999). Corpus Inscriptionum Arabicarum Palaestinae, B-C. Vol. 2. BRILL. ISBN 90-04-11083-6.
- Sharon, M. (2009). Corpus Inscriptionum Arabicarum Palaestinae, G. Vol. 4. BRILL. ISBN 978-90-04-17085-8.
- Ze'evi, D. (1996). An Ottoman century: The District of Jerusalem in the 1600s. Albany, NY: State University of New York Press. ISBN 0-7914-2915-6.
