= Ridwan dynasty =

Prominent pasha family in Palestine in the 1560s

Al Ridwan
- Hereditary Governors
- Country: Ottoman Empire
- Founded: 1560s
- Founder: Kara Shahin Mustafa; Ridwan Pasha
- Final ruler: Ahmad Pasha ibn Musa
- Titles: sanjak-beys of Gaza; umara' al-hajj
- Dissolution: 1690

The Ridwan dynasty (also spelled Radwan; Turkish: Rizvan) was the most prominent family in Palestine, ruling the southwestern districts of the Damascus Eyalet ("Province of Damascus") in the 16th and 17th centuries under Ottoman rule. The dynasty was based in Gaza, where its members continuously served as the hereditary sanjak-beys (district governors) of the sanjak (provincial district) for over a century. Members also ruled different provinces and districts throughout the Ottoman Empire and held additional titles at different times. The Ridwan period in Gaza was considered the city's last golden age.

The dynasty was founded by Kara Şahin Mustafa Pasha, who served as governor of a number of provinces and district, including Gaza, during his career. The dynasty was named after Mustafa's son Ridwan Pasha who served as Gaza's governor in 1570 until he was succeeded by his son Ahmad Pasha ibn Ridwan two years later. The latter served for 30 years, during which time Gaza became the chief stronghold of the dynasty. The sanjaks of Jerusalem and Nablus came under Ahmad Pasha's administration intermittently throughout his rule.

After Ahmad Pasha was reassigned as beylerbey (provincial governor) of Damascus in 1601, his son Hasan Arap Pasha inherited Gaza's governorship, occupying the office for 43 years. His rule impoverished Gaza and bankrupted the dynasty. Hasan Pasha's son and successor Husayn Pasha was appointed to the office in 1644 and served until 1672. Under Husayn Pasha's leadership, Gaza became a prosperous, secure and religiously diverse city. He was deposed and executed by the Ottoman authorities in 1663, after which his brother Musa Pasha was appointed to the post, serving until 1679. The last Ridwan governor of Gaza was Musa Pasha's son Ahmad Pasha whose governorship ended in 1690.

== History ==
=== Founding ===
The Ridwan dynasty was founded by Kara Shahin Mustafa (later known as "Mustafa Pasha"), an ethnic Bosnian, and former kapikulu (slave of the Porte) of Suleiman the Magnificent. As part of the Ottoman devsirme system, Mustafa Pasha received his education from the inner service of the palace, gradually being promoted to high-ranking positions in the government. In 1524, after having successively served as the governor of Erzerum and Diyarbekir and then as the personal tutor of Sultan Suleiman's son Shahzade Bayazit, he was temporarily appointed the governorship of Gaza, capital of an eponymous sanjak retaining its importance from the previous Mamluk era. By 1560, he had been promoted to the governorship of Egypt.

Mustafa Pasha was succeeded as governor of Gaza by his son Ridwan Pasha, who gave the Ridwan dynasty its name. Ridwan had formerly served as the treasurer of Yemen. In 1565, Ridwan Pasha was promoted to beylerbey (governor-general) of Yemen for two years before returning to rule Gaza for a short period of time in 1567. Meanwhile, in 1566, Mustafa Pasha was deposed by the new sultan Selim II for his closeness to Bayazit, Selim's brother and rival for power. Mustafa Pasha died shortly thereafter. According to historian Jean-Pierre Filiu, Ridwan became governor of Gaza in 1570. By 1571, Ridwan Pasha had been promoted to vali (provincial governor) of Habesh (Coastal Abyssinia), Basra and Diyarbekir in succession, while Bahram Pasha, the second son of Mustafa Pasha and a high-ranking official in the Ottoman government, became governor of Nablus in the mid-16th-century. After some time Bahram Pasha was promoted to beylerbey of Damascus and later amir al-hajj (commander of the hajj; pl. umara al-hajj), making him responsible for the Muslim pilgrimage caravan to Mecca.

=== Stronghold in Gaza ===
In Gaza, Ridwan Pasha was replaced by his son Ahmad Pasha, who ruled for nearly 30 years. At times during his rule, the sanjaks of Nablus and Jerusalem were attached to Gaza Sanjak. The latter became the family's stronghold and base of power under Ahmad Pasha's leadership. Towards the 17th century, he had the Mamluk-era Qasr al-Basha in Gaza enlarged and transformed into the family's fortress and governor's palace. Ahmad Pasha intermittently served as amir al-hajj, but struggled to gain further promotion by the Ottoman government, having to lobby several Istanbul-based viziers and bureaucrats with large sums of money and other gifts, unlike his predecessors. He was eventually appointed as governor of Damascus in 1601, while his son Hasan "'Arap" Pasha subsequently inherited the governorship of Gaza. Ahmad Pasha later died in 1607.

Hasan Pasha's nickname Arap ("Bedouin") derived from the Ridwan family's good relations with and reputation for keeping the Bedouin tribes in check. When Hasan was commissioned by Sultan Murad IV to help suppress the long-running rebellion of Fakhr ad-Din II (1623-1635), Hasan's Bedouin units often proved effective in battle. During this period, Hasan Pasha gained the additional governorship of Tripoli, although he was deposed in 1644. His rule impoverished Gaza Sanjak and burdened the Ridwan family with heavy debts. According to the Damascene historian and Hasan's contemporary, Muhammad Amin al-Muhibbi, Hasan Pasha had numerous wives and concubines and fathered 85 children. During Hasan Pasha's lifetime, one of his sons, Husayn Pasha, served as governor of Nablus and Jerusalem as well as amir al-hajj.

After Hasan Pasha's 1644 dismissal, Husayn Pasha inherited the governorship of Gaza and administered the district well. Because he was able to guarantee the safety of the main roads and the countryside by securing and maintaining close relations with the local Bedouin tribes, Gaza and other cities in Palestine were able to prosper and develop extensively during Husayn Pasha's reign. The city's importance was elevated to the point where Gaza was considered the "capital of Palestine" by the French consul of Sidon, Chevalier d'Arvieux. Husayn Pasha also developed friendly relationships with the city's Christian and Jewish communities, allowing the former to construct new churches and restore existing ones. Husayn Pasha appointed his son Ibrahim as governor of Jerusalem, but Ibrahim died in a 1661 military expedition against the Druze clans of Lebanon.

=== Fall ===
In 1663, Husayn Pasha was sent on an expedition to assist the governor of Damascus in quelling a Bedouin rebellion, but failed and left the battle disgraced. After petitions by his enemies in the Ottoman government, he was summoned to Istanbul where he was imprisoned and killed shortly afterward. According to historian Dror Ze'evi, the Ottoman state become wary of the growing power of the Ridwans and believed that eliminating Husayn Pasha would enable them to "destroy the remnants of the extended dynasty." The imperial authorities were also uncomfortable with Husayn Pasha's ties to the French consul and the local Christians. According to Filiu, Husayn's elimination was a result of this "special relationship".

Musa Pasha succeeded his brother Husayn Pasha as governor of Gaza and central Palestine, but the length of his tenure is not exactly known, although a document from Jerusalem in 1670 listed him as governor. According to historian Jean-Pierre Filiu, Musa Pasha's rule ended in 1679. Musa discontinued Husayn's liberal policies with non-Muslims and was more cautious of Ottoman wishes during his rule. Ahmad Pasha ibn Musa succeeded his father and was the last Ridwan governor of Gaza, serving until 1690. Following the end of his rule, the Ridwan dynasty was stripped of its hereditary governorship and afterward officials appointed by the Ottoman government came to rule Gaza, which gradually declined in importance. This coincided with a general withdrawal of support for local dynasties from the Sublime Porte (Ottoman imperial government). The modern-day descendants of the Ridwan dynasty are known in Gaza as Dar al-Basha or "House of the Pashas".

== Culture ==
The Ridwan family modeled their dynasty on the imperial Ottoman household and during military engagements they would carry battle standards representing their dynasty and bring marching bands. The Ridwan family saw themselves as the leaders of the wider region and the patrons of other ruling families. Farrukh Pasha, the Circassian governor of Jerusalem and founder of the prominent Farrukh dynasty, was a former mamluk (slave soldier) of Bahram Pasha. The Farrukh dynasty ruled the Nablus Sanjak up until the mid-17th century. Kiwan, another mamluk of the Ridwan dynasty, became a major aide to the governor of Damascus before his son gained the governorship and the office of amir al-hajj in the 1670s.

It is not known whether the Ridwan family members preferred to use Arabic or Turkish to communicate with each other and the mostly Arabic-speaking people living in their districts. As Ottoman officials, they spoke Turkish well, but it is also apparent that they were well-versed in Arabic language and customs, due to the command of Arabic literature possessed by the various Ridwan governors and the close ties they maintained with the local elites, such as the Arab Turabay family, and the Bedouin tribes. With the exception of imperial or provincial decrees, court records in the sanjaks of Gaza, Nablus, Jerusalem and Lajjun, which the Ridwans and their allies often ruled, were recorded in Arabic, although the qadi was typically an imperial Turkish speaker and thus, Turkish-language records were not required. The intermarriage and socio-political ties that the Ridwans maintained with the Turabays and the Circassian Farrukhs created a "new Bedouin-Ottoman hybrid culture" that was "evident in court life, dress and probably language as well", according to historian Dror Ze'evi.

=== Ridwan-Turabay-Farrukh alliance ===
Between the 16th and 17th centuries, three families controlled the sanjaks that constituted the region of Palestine: the Ridwans presided over Gaza, while the Farrukhs and Turabays presided over Nablus and Lajjun, respectively. Because of common interests and prior military slave relationships, the three families forged close ties throughout the course of their rule. The Ridwans were the dominant faction in this emerging unified dynasty. Evidence of intermarriage between the families is indicated by Ottoman registers. For example, the granddaughter of Ahmad ibn Turabay, the founder of the Turabay dynasty, was the mother of Governor Assaf Farrukh Pasha. Assaf's wife was Shaqra Khatun, a daughter of Governor Husayn Pasha. After the deaths of Assaf Pasha and Shaqra, two of their sons, Muhammad Bey and Ali Bey, entered the custody of Husayn's brother, Governor Musa Pasha. A daughter of Hasan "Arap" Pasha, sister to Musa and Husayn, was married to Assaf's brother Ali Farrukh. Sharing common property also helped sustain the families' unity.

The Ridwan-Farrukh-Turabay alliance treated the territories of Palestine and, at times, Transjordan, as hereditary fiefdoms. During troublesome periods, the three families would unite their forces to confront challenges from rebels or local rivals. The military relationship between them originated with the protection of the annual hajj caravan. When a particular governor was assigned the role of amir al-hajj, it would require him to depart from his sanjak for extended time periods. In order to protect their districts from Bedouin raids, tax evasion and personal property damage, departing governors normally entrusted their authority with the rulers of the neighboring sanjak. For example, in 1589, Ridwan Pasha requested Assaf ibn Turabay to temporarily replace him as governor of Damascus, beginning a tradition that lasted well into the 17th century.

The mutual trust between the families developed into a firm military alliance in the early 17th century as a result of the increasing strength of Fakhr-al-Din II in Ottoman Syria. Backed by the Medici Grand Duke of Tuscany, Fakhr-al-Din briefly repaired his relations with the Ottoman government and in 1622 gained control of the Safad and Ajlun sanjaks, became governor of Nablus and appointed mutasallim (tax collector) of Gaza. His forces proceeded to head towards Jerusalem, traversing Palestine's coastal plain. Fakhr al-Din's moves threatened the rule of the three families who, after encouragement from the Sublime Porte in Istanbul, formed a coalition to stop his advance. In 1623, the armies of Hasan "Arap" Pasha, Muhammad ibn Farrukh and Ahmad ibn Turabay successfully routed Fakhr al-Din's army at the Awja River, forcing him to withdraw from Palestine.

=== Building works ===
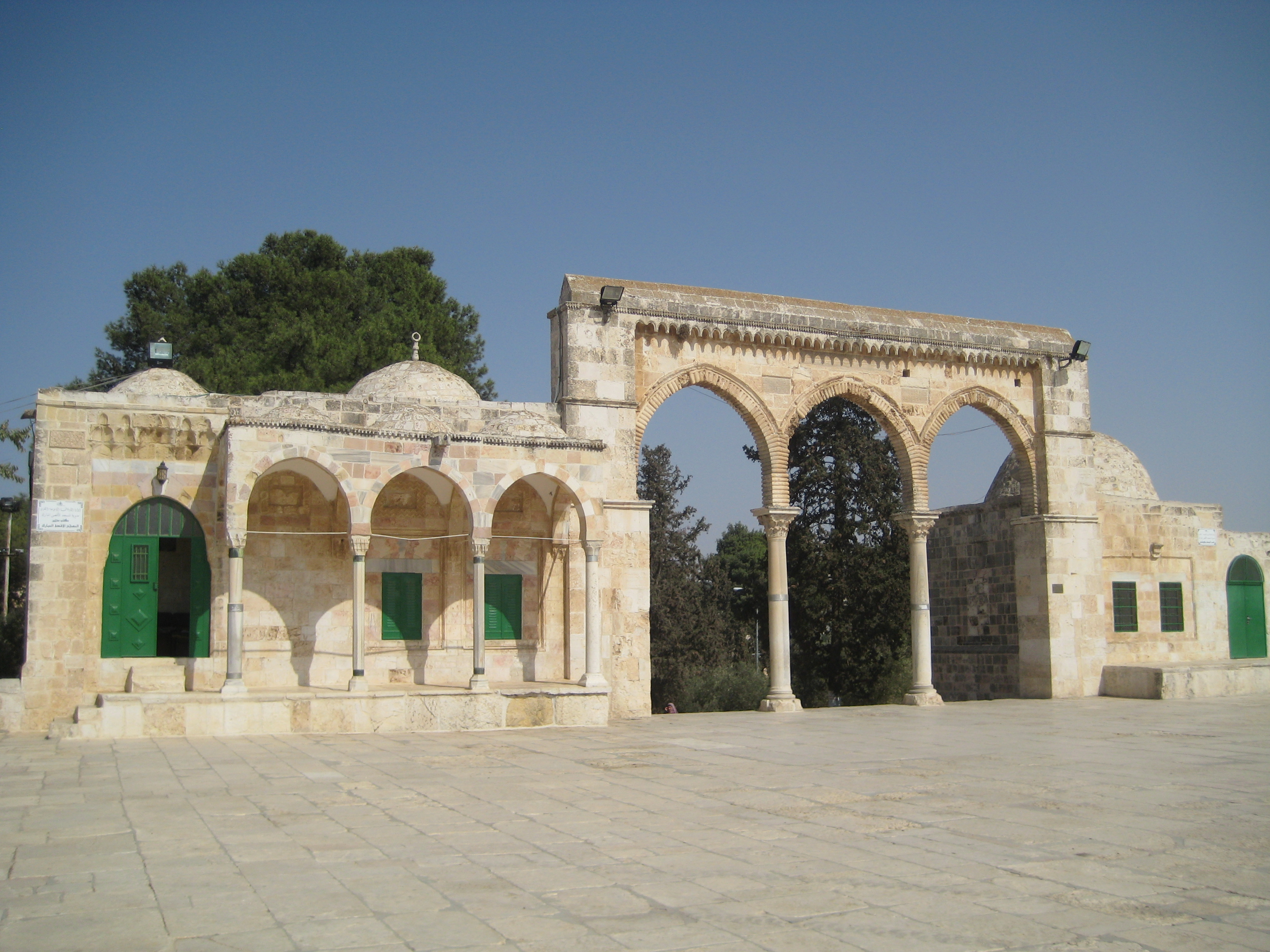
The khalwa of Ahmad ibn Ridwan on the Temple Mount in Jerusalem

Throughout their reign, the Ridwan dynasty accumulated vast wealth in Gaza, including agricultural lands and several real estate properties. The family allocated a large part of that wealth to awqaf (religious trusts), which they used to fund the construction and maintenance of various public buildings. Some members of the dynasty were buried in Maqbarat al-Ridwan (Ridwan Family Graveyard) located just south of the Great Mosque of Gaza. As of 2008, the cemetery contained a few marble graves.

The family restored the minarets of two mosques in the Shuja'iyya quarter of Gaza, while Musa Pasha had the minaret of the Great Mosque of Gaza rebuilt. A mosque was also constructed within the confines of the Qasr al-Basha fortress, which later came to be known as the Ridwan Castle in light of its function as the Ridwans' residence (ad-Dabawiyya). The fortress itself was outfitted with additional defenses, including arrow slits and narrow openings, which were extended to employ the use of cannon. During Ridwan rule, the Qaysariyyah Market in Gaza's al-Daraj quarter was reconstructed as was the Hamam al-Sammara bathhouse and the former Khan az-Zayt caravansary. Bahram Pasha ordered the construction of the main sabil ("fountain") in Gaza in the mid-16th-century.

At the Temple Mount (Haram al-Sharif) in Jerusalem, Ahmad Pasha ibn Ridwan had a khalwa, known as the Mamluk Khalwa, built for local Sufis headed by al-Ghazi Abu al-Sa'ud, and for the study of Islamic jurisprudence in 1601. The architect of the khalwa was Abd al-Muhsin ibn Nimr, who worked Ahmad Pasha's other projects in Jerusalem. Ahmad Pasha established a waqf to fund Abu al-Sa'ud and the khalwa's upkeep and management.

== List of Ridwan governors of Gaza ==
Governor	Reigned	Notes
Kara Shahin Mustafa Pasha	Mid-15th century	First Ridwan governor of Gaza. Precise date of governorship undetermined
Ridwan Pasha	1570–1573	Son of Kara Shahin Mustafa Pasha.
Ahmad Pasha I	1585–1605	Son of Ridwan Pasha
'Arab Hasan Pasha	1605–1644	Son of Ahmad Pasha I
Husayn Pasha	1644–1661	Son of 'Arab Hasan Pasha
Ibrahim Pasha	1660–1661	Son of Husayn Pasha. Died one year into office in a military expedition.
Husayn Pasha	1661–1662	Second term. Imprisoned and executed in 1662/63.
Musa Pasha	1663–1679	Brother of Husayn Pasha
Ahmad Pasha II	1679–1690	Son of Musa Pasha. Last Ridwan governor of Gaza.

== See also ==
- List of rulers of Gaza

== Bibliography ==
- Filiu, Jean-Pierre (2014). Gaza: A History. Oxford University Press. ISBN 9780190201890.
- Labat, Jean Baptiste (1735). Mémoires du Chevalier d'Arvieux (in French). Charles Jean Baptiste Delespine.
- Natsheh, Yusuf (2010). "North-Western Khalwa of Ahmad Pasha". Pilgrimage, Sciences and Sufism: Islamic Art in the West Bank and Gaza. Museum With No Frontiers. ISBN 9783902782113.
- Shahin, Mariam (2005). Palestine: A Guide. Interlink Books. ISBN 1-56656-557-X.
- Sharon, Moshe (2009). Corpus Inscriptionum Arabicarum Palaestinae, G. Vol. 4. BRILL. ISBN 978-90-04-17085-8.
- Watenpaugh, Heghnar (1999). The Image of an Ottoman City: Imperial Architecture and the Representation of Urban Life in Aleppo in the Sixteenth and Seventeenth Centuries. University of California.
- Ze'evi, Dror (2012). An Ottoman century: the district of Jerusalem in the 1600s. SUNY Press. ISBN 978-0-7914-2915-0.
