= Husayn Pasha =

Ottoman governor of Gaza

Husayn Pasha حسن باشا

Sanjak-bey of Gaza
- In office 1644–1660
- Monarch: Mehmed IV
- Preceded by: 'Arab Hasan Pasha ibn Ahmad
- Succeeded by: Ibrahim Pasha ibn Husayn
- In office 1661–1662
- Preceded by: Ibrahim Pasha ibn Husayn
- Succeeded by: Musa Pasha ibn Hasan

Personal details
- Born: Gaza,
- Died: 1663 Constantinople, Ottoman Empire
- Relations: Ridwan dynasty
- Children: Ibrahim Pasha; Shaqra Khatun (daughter)

Military service
- Allegiance: Ottoman Empire
- Commands: Amir al-hajj

Ḥusayn Pasha ibn Ḥasan ibn Aḥmad ibn Riḍwān ibn Muṣṭafā ibn ʿAbd al-Muʿīn Pasha (Arabic: حسين باشا بن حسن رضوان) (died 1662 or 1663) was the Ottoman governor of Gaza Sanjak, a district which extended from Jaffa and Ramla in the north to Bayt Jibrin in the southeast and Rafah in the south, with Gaza as its capital. Husayn belonged to the Ridwan family, who long held the governorship of Gaza. Husayn Pasha became governor in 1644 after succeeding his father 'Arab Hasan Pasha. He served, with a brief interruption by his son Ibrahim in 1660, until his imprisonment in 1662. Husayn Pasha also served intermittent terms as governor of Nablus and Jerusalem and as amir al-hajj (commander of the Hajj caravan). Gaza prospered under Husayn Pasha and its political importance rose so much so that the French consul considered it to be the virtual capital of Palestine. Husayn Pasha maintained friendly relations with the Bedouin tribes of the region, local Christian communities and the French. In 1662, Husayn Pasha was imprisoned by the Ottoman imperial authorities and executed in Damascus later that year or in Constantinople in 1663.

== Biography ==
In the mid-17th century Husayn Pasha served as governor of Jerusalem and Nablus. From 1524, his family, the Ridwan dynasty, had administered much of Palestine and parts of the Lebanon and Syria on behalf of their Ottoman superiors based in Constantinople and Damascus. Husayn Pasha was also appointed amir al-hajj (commander of the Hajj caravan). This position entrusted him with provisioning and protecting the annual Hajj pilgrim caravan from Bedouin raids while the pilgrims traversed the desert route to Mecca in the Hejaz.

=== Governor of Gaza ===
Husayn inherited the governorship of Gaza from his father 'Arab Hasan Pasha following the latter's removal from the post in 1644. Prior to the assumption of this post, Gaza was in an impoverished economic state and the Ridwan family was greatly indebted. In 1656, the Ottoman central authorities, wary of Husayn Pasha's overarching influence in Palestine, attempted to implicate Husayn Pasha in a corruption scandal regarding unclear cash and property transactions in a Nablus-based meeting between himself, his brother-in-law Assaf Pasha, a group of notables from Jabal Nablus and an Ottoman official from Istanbul, Ismail Pasha. According to contemporary testimonies, a group of village headmen from Jabaliya apparently harmed by the Nablus deal went to Damascus to lodge a complaint to the authorities against Ismail Pasha. However, they were advised by the Ottoman authorities in Damascus to instead file the complaint against Husayn Pasha, in an effort to undermine his credibility.

To restore Gaza's failing commerce sector, Husayn Pasha obtained a large loan from the French consul in Jerusalem, Chevalier d'Arvieux. When pressed to pay in 1659, Husayn made strenuous efforts to produce the funds and promptly paid back d'Arvieux in a meeting in the town of Ramla. D'Arvieux then proceeded to lavish fine robes and cloth to show his gratitude to Husayn Pasha.

Husayn Pasha maintained a positive reputation among the Bedouin tribes who largely dominated the desert areas surrounding Gaza. This relationship resulted in a drastic fall in the previously routine armed conflict between the nomadic Bedouin and the settled population of Gaza and the nearby towns. According to his contemporary biographer, Muhammad al-Muhibbi, Husayn Pasha was able to subdue the Bedouin tribes and gain their cooperation. The Bedouin tribal chiefs reportedly visited his court in Gaza to pay their respects. According to historian Martin Abraham Meyer, Husayn's influence over the Bedouin was "marked" and they ended their plundering campaigns against the city, allowing its economy to grow unhindered.

A more able governor than his predecessor, Husayn Pasha was able to restore the Ridwan family's wealth, and Gaza entered into a period of prosperity. The status of the city was elevated to the point that d'Arvieux described it as the capital of Palestine. Husayn Pasha's rule over Gaza was considered beneficent, and according to Meyer "all things prospered under his rule." Economic activity at the time was principally agricultural and centered on the cultivation of grain. While industry was primitive, Gaza became a principal manufacturer of soap and wine. Husayn was well known throughout Palestine for his many charities and hospitality.

In addition to the majority Muslim population, there existed large communities of Jews and Christians who thrived under Husayn's administration. Husayn maintained friendly relations with the various Christian communities in Palestine as well as the French missionaries. Unusual at the time for a Muslim ruler, he allowed local Christians to build a church near the Great Mosque of Gaza, repair already existing churches throughout the province and construct hospices.

He appointed his son Ibrahim as governor of Jerusalem and later on handed over to him his post as governor of Gaza, the Ridwan dynasty's stronghold. He retained the office of governor of Nablus and continued to command the annual Hajj pilgrimage from Damascus to Mecca. Husayn Pasha restored himself as governor of Gaza in 1661 when Ibrahim was killed in an Ottoman-ordered punitive expedition against Druze rebels in Mount Lebanon.

=== Imprisonment and death ===
Anonymous petitions were sent to the Ottoman capital Istanbul decrying his leadership of the Hajj caravan, which was justification enough for the Ottoman authorities to depose him. Thus, during the caravan’s stop at the Muzayrib fortress en route to Mecca, Husayn Pasha was arrested and then imprisoned in Damascus. Shortly after, he was transferred to Constantinople where he was killed while incarcerated in 1662-63. Historian Jean-Pierre Filiu asserts that Husayn Pasha was executed in the Damascus citadel in 1662. Mourning Husayn Pasha's death, the Damascene poet Abd as-Samman al-Dimashqi wrote:

"He committed no crime, but these are days of envy's rule. Chained inside a dungeon cell, they feared him as one would fear a sword in its scabbard."

Husayn Pasha was succeeded by his brother Musa Pasha. According to historian Dror Ze'evi, "the Ottomans must have assumed that by killing Husayn Pasha, they ... would eventually be able to destroy the remnants of the extended dynasty." Members of the Ridwan family continued to govern Gaza consecutively, but from a weakened position and with considerably less political influence. The last Ridwan governor was Musa Pasha's son Ahmad Pasha who ruled until 1690.

== Personal life ==
=== Traits ===
While Muhibbi describes Arab Hasan Pasha as a reckless "spendthrift and hedonist", Husayn Pasha was described as a "paragon of perfection". Muhibbi claimed Husayn Pasha was handsome, noble and cultured and "a man of deeds whose reputation preceded him". Although Husayn Pasha was illiterate, he memorized several books of Arabic poetry and prose. He was further described as a "resolute leader" in war and politics.

=== Family ===
Husayn Pasha had a number of children, including adopted child relatives. His son Ibrahim was killed in combat in 1661. He adopted his late sister's son Farrukh whose deceased father, Ali ibn Muhammad Farrukh, had been a leading amir himself. Husayn Pasha's daughter Shaqra Khatun was married to the amir Assaf Pasha. Husayn Pasha had 85 siblings, most notable among them was Husayn's successor, Musa Pasha.

According to historian Theodore Dowling, Husayn's serai, today known as Qasr al-Basha, was lavishly furnished and stood in the middle of a garden. One of the servant families were the Frangi who were of Greek Catholic origin, but converted to Islam. Assalan Frangi was Husayn Pasha's secretary.

== See also ==
- Ahmad ibn Ridwan

== Bibliography ==
- Filiu, Jean-Pierre (2014). Gaza: A History. Oxford University Press. ISBN 9780190201890.
- Dowling, Theodore Edward (1913). Gaza: A City of Many Battles (from the family of Noah to the Present Day). S.P.C.K. "Gaza a city of many battles."
- Mattar, Phillip (2005). Encyclopedia of the Palestinians. Infobase Publishing. ISBN 0-8160-5764-8. Archived from the original on 2012-08-05.
- Meyer, Martin Abraham (1907). History of the city of Gaza: from the earliest times to the present day. Columbia University Press. p. 84. "Nasir Gaza."
- Ze'evi, Dror (1996). An Ottoman Century: The District of Jerusalem in the 1600s. SUNY Press. ISBN 0-7914-2915-6.
