= Musa Pasha ibn Hasan =

Musa Pasha ibn Hasan موسى باشا بن حسن Pasha

Amir al-umara

Sanjak-bey of Gaza
- In office 1663 – Late 1670s
- Monarch: Mehmed IV
- Preceded by: Husayn Pasha ibn Hasan
- Succeeded by: Ahmad Pasha ibn Musa

Personal details
- Born: Gaza
- Relations: Ridwan dynasty
- Children: Ahmad Pasha

Musa Pasha ibn Hasan ibn Ahmad ibn Ridwan ibn Mustafa (Arabic: موسى باشا بن حسن رضوان) was the Governor of Gaza and Jerusalem during the period of Ottoman rule in Palestine in the second half of the 17th century. His reign extended from 1663, when he succeeded his deposed and executed brother Husayn Pasha, until the late 1670s. Musa's son Ahmad Pasha succeeded his father, and was the last Ridwan governor of Gaza, serving until 1690.

Although he was noted to be amiable by disposition, he established a strict regime that was much less tolerant to Gaza's Jewish and Christian communities, which had prospered under Husayn Pasha's rule. The French consul of Jerusalem at the time, Chevalier d'Arvieux believed this policy was put in place because of Musa's fears of being portrayed as pro-Christian or pro-French; his brother Husayn Pasha headed a very tolerant and successful administration and was believed to have been deposed, imprisoned and executed by the Ottoman authorities for that reason. Historian Dror Ze'evi described Musa as a "weak and unimpressive governor." After the deaths of his niece Shaqra Khatun and her husband Assaf Pasha, custody of their children Muhammad Bey, Ali Bey and Mahmanud Khanim was transferred to Musa who was put in charge of their inheritance.

In 1663 Musa commissioned a restoration of the Great Mosque of Gaza and had his name inscribed on the mantle of its mihrab. Gaza still remained relatively prosperous under Musa's rule which was largely credited to the policies his predecessor Husayn Pasha put into place. The city continued to serve as the virtual capital of Palestine. However, not long after Musa's reign, Gaza's economy and political status began to decline and by the 19th century, it was no more than a small town.

== See also ==
- Ahmad ibn Ridwan

== Bibliography ==
- Meyer, Martin Abraham (1907). History of the city of Gaza: from the earliest times to the present day. Columbia University Press. ISBN 9780231914321.
- Ze'evi, Dror (1996). An Ottoman Century: The District of Jerusalem in the 1600s. SUNY Press. ISBN 0-7914-2915-6.
