= Qasr al-Basha =

Museum in Gaza City, Palestine

Coordinates: 31°30′15.90″N 34°27′57.48″E

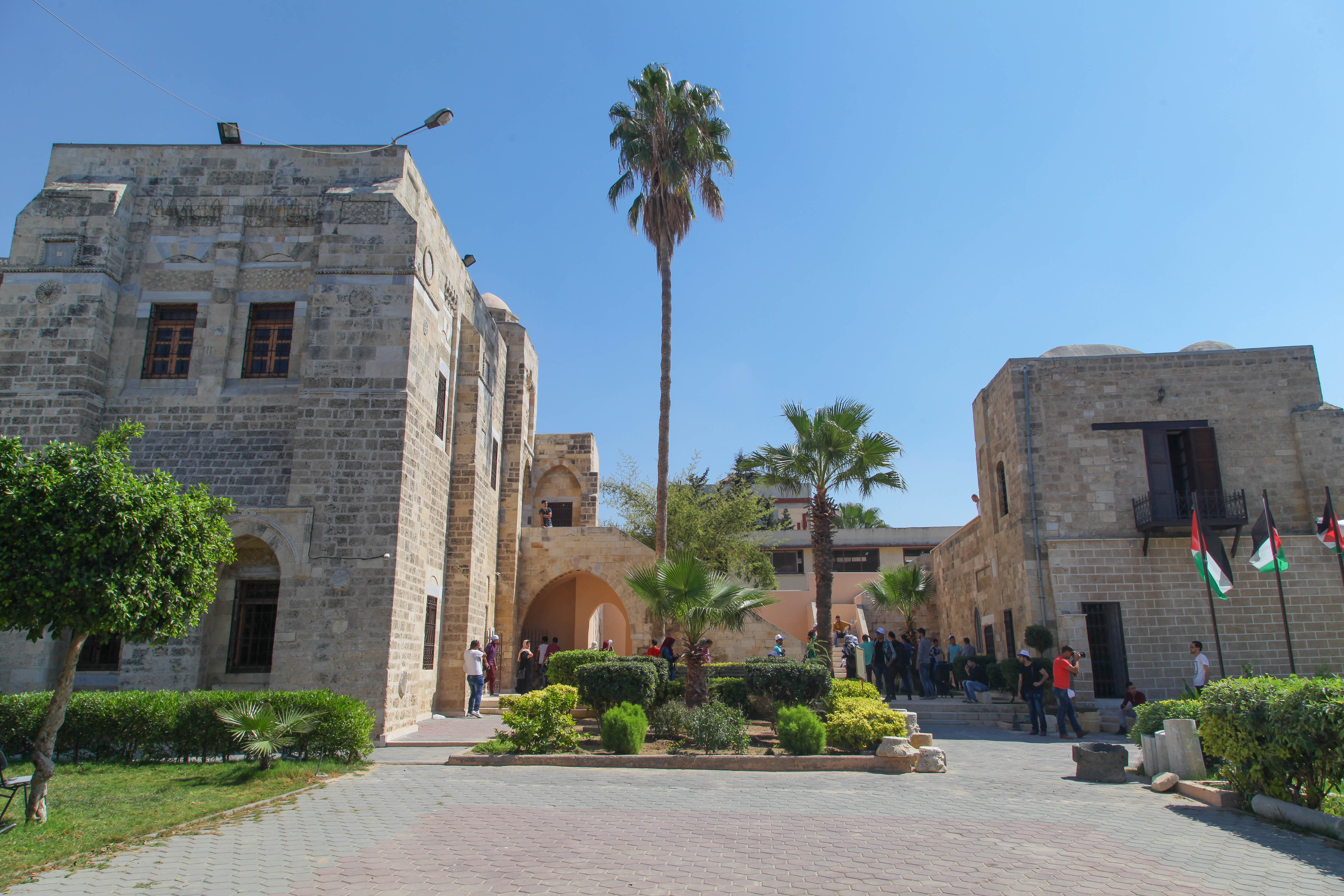
The palace in 2016

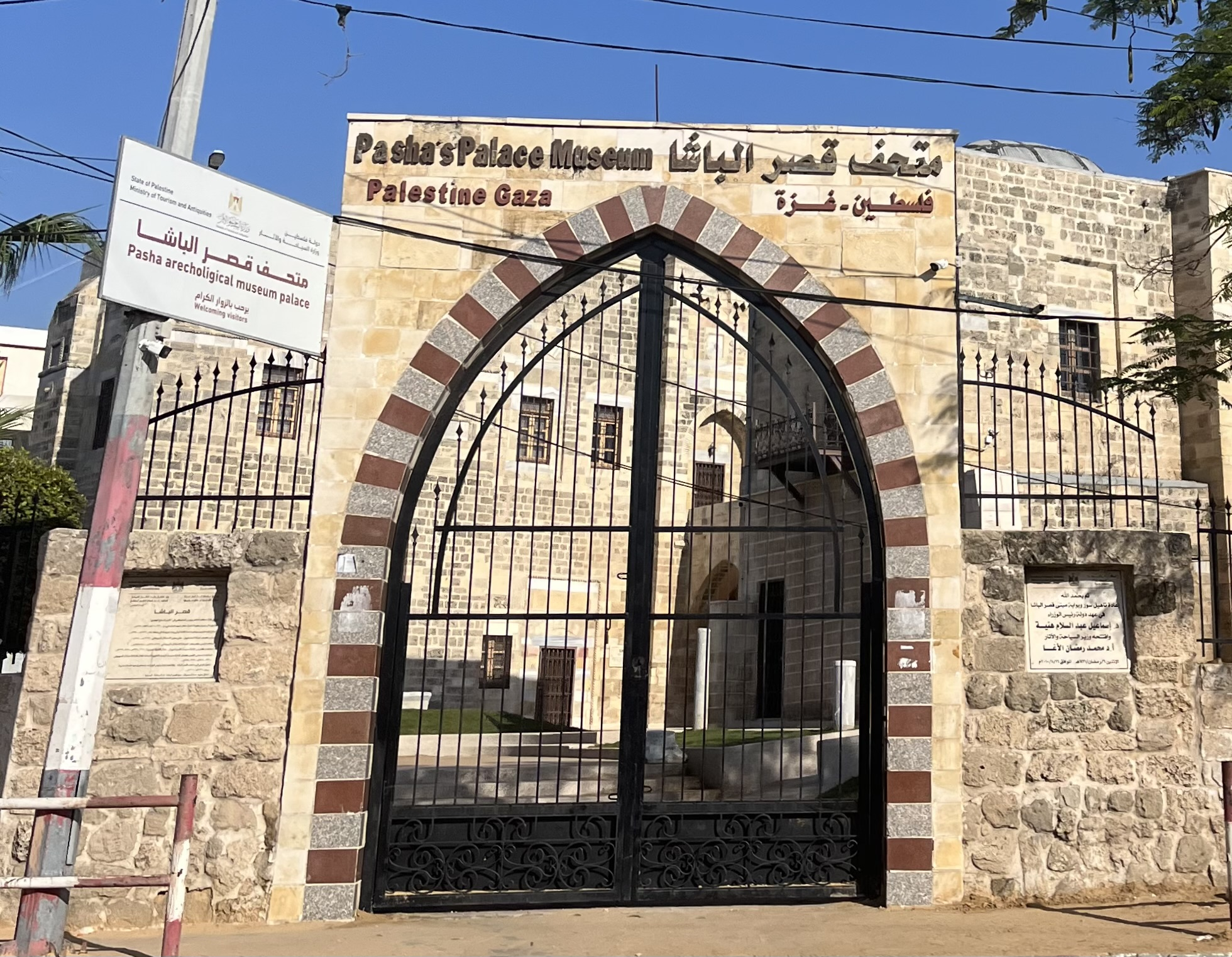
The museum entrance

Qasr al-Basha (Arabic: قصر الباشا), also known as Pasha's Palace Museum, Radwan Castle, and Napoleon's Fort, was a historic building in the Old City of Gaza, Palestine. At the time of its destruction, it housed a museum. It served as a seat of power in the Mamluk and Ottoman periods and as a police station during the British Mandate. It was destroyed in the Israeli invasion of Gaza in 2024.

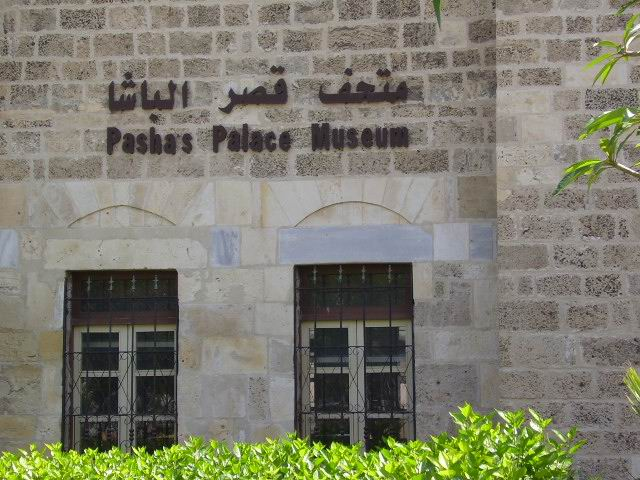
Pasha's Palace Museum

== History ==
=== Mamluk period ===
The first floor of Qasr al-Basha was built by the Mamluk sultan Zahir Baibars in the mid-13th century. The façade bore the symbol of Baibars which is a relief sculpture of two lions facing each other. The geometrical patterns and domes, fan and cross vaults were typical Mamluk architecture under Bahri rule. According to local legend, in the 13th century CE, when Baibars was still a general fighting the Crusaders and Mongols throughout the Levant, he passed through Gaza on several occasions. During one of his visits, Baibars is believed to have married in Gaza and built a grand mansion for his Gazan wife and children. It is said that Qasr al-Basha is what remains of this home.

=== Ottoman period ===
The second floor of the building was largely of Ottoman-era construction. In the 17th century, Qasr al-Basha served as the fortress home of the ruling Radwan dynasty (hence the name "Radwan Castle") and later pashas of Gaza, who were governors appointed by the Ottoman governor of the Damascus Province. During this era, the fortress was provided with arrow slits and underground passages as means of defense. Within the complex were soldier's lodgings, a mosque, granary, an armory, and cannons. The height of the structure made Qasr al-Basha a strategic point in Gaza. This, along with its fortifications, was the probable reason Napoleon Bonaparte spent three nights at the palace during his invasion that ended at Acre in 1799, hence the name "Napoleon's Fort".

Turkish traveller Evliya Çelebi wrote of Qasr al-Basha in 1649, saying "the Citadel was built in ancient times and destroyed by Nebuchadnezzar. The present citadel derives from a later time. It is small and rectangular and lies one hour distant, east of the sea. Its walls are twenty yards high. It has a metal door which opens in the direction of the qibla. The commander and the garrison must always be present here to fulfill their guard duties because it is in a dangerous place, here the Arab tribes and the enemy are numerous."

=== 20th century ===
During the British Mandate of Palestine it served as a police station. During the administration of Gaza by Egypt, Qasr al-Basha served as a school, Princess Farial School for Girls. After Farouk of Egypt was deposed, the school was renamed al-Zahra Secondary School for Girls.

=== Recent decades ===
Funded by a German Development Bank (KfW) grant, the United Nations Development Programme (UNDP) converted Qasr al-Basha into a museum. After building new facilities for the girls school, restoration began under the supervision of the Palestinian Authority Department of Antiquities and Cultural Heritage. During the first phase of the project, workers landscaped the museum grounds, installed new doors, windows and gates, and restored the façade of the palace. In the second phase of the project, display cases were installed and exhibitions were held of Neolithic, Ancient Egyptian, Phoenician, Persian, Hellenistic, and Roman artifacts. The smaller building in front of the palace became a gateway to the museum.

Qasr al-Basha was heavily damaged after Israeli bombardment attacks during the Israeli invasion of Gaza as of March 2024. The BBC reported that "IDF [said] it had no information about why the Pasha's Palace was targeted in the war". In 2024 a group of French researchers convened an enterprise to build an inventory of Palestinian artefacts, so that in the widespread destruction of cultural sites, an archive of some of them could remain. "As Israeli bombardments wipe Gaza off the map and our sense of powerlessness grows, what can we do as researchers?" asked Fabrice Virgili, Director of Research at CNRS (Centre National de la Recherche Scientifique). Following the ceasefire in late 2025, clearance of rubble began and recovery of remaining artifacts at the palace with support from the Centre for Cultural Heritage Preservation. A lack of building materials such as cement and mortar prevented repair work, and by December 2025, a total of 30 artifacts had been recovered out of the collection of 17,000.

== Collections ==
The museum's collection includes artefacts discovered at archaeological sites in Gaza, spanning prehistory to recent history. A 4,500 year old statue of Anat, the Canaanite goddess of beauty, love and war, was recently on display. The museum made global headlines when a farmer in Khan Younis, Nidal Abu Eid, found the stone statue in his field in 2022. The building and objects in the collection are detailed in archaeological academia around the world.

On 12 February 2014 the museum opened a large exhibition of manuscripts, coins and photography, mostly pre-1948. There were written records of social events like marriage certificates, property sales, as well as government legislation; postal stamps and instruments from the British Mandate and Ottoman periods; stone carvings from shrines and graves; ancient manuscripts of the Psalms of David and the Uthmani Qur'an.

One of two Roman sarcophagi discovered at the Ard-al-Moharbeen necropolis in 2023 was exhibited at Qasr al-Basha. The Palestinian archaeologist Fadel al-Otol describes rooms full of Byzantine artefacts and sarcophagi.

== Digital archiving, artifacts sent abroad ==
In recent years, artefacts from Qasr al-Basha have been touring to different countries around the world. The desire to keep artefacts safe during the widespread destruction of Gaza by the Israeli army has prompted major touring programmes, as well as the construction of global museum digital archiving practices. At the Arab World Institute in Paris, an exhibition in 2023 imagined, "the creation of a “virtual museum” designed to safeguard the heritage of a stateless, blockaded and war-ravaged land". Elodie Bouffard, the curator of the exhibition, spoke of the curation in diaspora as a form of “cultural resistance” to counter the erasure of Palestinian culture and presence. This is a practice that has been taken up by groups of researchers in France, Museum of Art and History in Switzerland and organisations like Forensic Architecture in England.

== See also ==
- List of museums in Palestine
- Ahmad ibn Ridwan (d. 1607), Ottoman governor
- Husayn Pasha (d. 1662/63), Ottoman governor
- Musa Pasha ibn Hasan Ridwan, Ottoman governor 1663-late 1670s
- Destruction of cultural heritage during the Gaza war
- List of archaeological sites in the Gaza Strip
