= Khayr al-Din al-Ramli =

Ottoman Islamic jurist (1585–1671)

Khayr al-DIn
- Title: al-Ramli

Personal life
- Born: 1585 Ramla, Damascus Eyalet, Ottoman Empire
- Died: 1671 (aged 85–86) Ramla, Sidon Eyalet, Ottoman Empire

Religious life
- Religion: Islam
- Denomination: Sunni
- Jurisprudence: Hanafi

Khayr al-Din ibn Ahmad ibn Nur al-Din Ali ibn Zayn al-Din ibn Abd al-Wahab al-Ayubi al-Farooqui (1585–1671), better known as Khayr al-Din al-Ramli (Arabic: خير الدين الرملي), was a 17th-century Islamic jurist, teacher and writer in then Ottoman-ruled Palestine. He is well known for issuing a collection of fatwas that became highly influential in Hanafi (one of four major schools of thought in Sunni Islam) jurisprudence in the 18th and 19th centuries.

== Early life and Islamic studies ==
Khayr al-Din al-Ramli was born in al-Ramla in Ottoman Palestine. At that time, al-Ramla was a major garrison town (and in the early years of Islamic rule it had been the administrative capital of the Jund Filastin, or military district of Palestine). Al-Ramli receives his name from the town; al-Ramli translates as "from Ramla." Not much is known about al-Ramli's early life other than he began reading the Qur'an as young child.

In 1598-99 CE, al-Ramli traveled to Egypt with his elder brothers to study in al-Azhar, the highest scholarly authority in Sunni Islam. There he befriended Sheikh Fayed, a well-known sage in Egypt. Fayed taught him lessons on Islam as well as how to cut hair. At the time, al-Ramli was interested in studying the Shafi'i school of Sunni Muslim thought (madhab), but was discouraged by his older brother, Taj al-Din, who preferred he focus on the Hanafi madhab. According to his biographer Muhammad al-Muhibbi, al-Ramli had a dream in which the founder of the Shafi'i madhab, Imam Shafi'i, stated to him "We are all on the straight path." A senior figure in the 'ulema (council of scholars) of al-Azhar told al-Ramli that the dream signaled he should follow his brother's advice and study the Hanafi madhab.

Muhibbi states that al-Ramli "worked hard" and "outdid" Taj al-Din, eventually gaining the attention of the lead scholar of al-Azhar, Sheikh Abdullah al-Nahiri. Al-Nahiri regularly invited al-Ramli and Taj al-Din to his home and gave them private lessons on the Hanafi thought. In 1603, al-Ramli graduated from al-Azhar and received honorary certificates from al-Nahiri as well as from another senior scholar, Sheikh Abd Allah. Prior to his return to al-Ramla, al-Ramli stopped in Gaza where he met the local 'ulema and the governor of the Gaza Sanjak, Ahmad ibn Ridwan. Ibn Ridwan was impressed by al-Ramli's new credentials and encouraged him to remain in Gaza which he did for a few months.

== Career ==
Upon returning to al-Ramla in 1604, he began teaching the Hanafi madhab to the residents of the area. He rapidly began to acquire estates in and around the city which he used to plant thousands of orchards including olives, figs and other fruits. Although he did not receive funds from the Ottoman state nor from the waqf, al-Ramli ordered the rehabilitation of a number of mosques and shrines in the surrounding area. He also funded religious personnel and his students who came from various parts of the Ottoman Empire. It is understood that al-Ramli used the revenues of his agricultural pursuits to bankroll most of his financial activities, allowing him to become a philanthropist in his community. According to biographer Ibrahim al-Janini, he collected roughly 1,200 books with multiple copies which he provided to provincial officials, 'ulema, and sheikhs who requested them.

Al-Ramli immediately issued numerous fatawa once he settled in al-Ramla, although he was not officially appointed the position of mufti by the state. Nonetheless, his rulings—which apparently were able to override fatawa issued by official muftis—reportedly reached Jerusalem, Damascus, Mecca, Istanbul and the Maghreb (northwestern Africa). He awarded legal certificates of approval to several Muslim scholars from these places. According to Muhibbi, "anyone who asked received one, either orally or in written form." Muhammad al-Ashari, the Grand Mufti of Jerusalem who adhered to the Shafi'i madhab, was one of many high-ranking Muslim jurists who requested a certificate from him. The muftis (Shafi'i and Hanafi) of Damascus and other major cities in Damascus Province would consult al-Ramli whenever problems arose regarding religious rulings. It was noted that even the Bedouin of the region who generally disregarded sharia law respected any fatwa issued by him due to cordial relations between them and al-Ramli. During this time period, al-Ramli also began importing various seeds from Egypt, and introduced them to Ramla.

== Legacy ==
Al-Ramli died in his hometown in 1671 at the age of 86. Al-Muhibbi described him as "the last of the great 'ulema." Al-Ramli's fatawa ("multiple edicts") were compiled into final form in 1670, in a collection entitled al-Fatawa al-Khayriyah. These fatawa are a contemporary record of the time, and also give a complex view of agrarian relations. Modern scholars are using his works to trace the path of embryonic territorial awareness, specifically that of Palestine. His fatawa reference the Roman province of Palaestina Prima, or as it was known in the early Islamic period, Jund Filastin. It was originally thought that term died out during the Mamluk and Ottoman states, as they did not use this concept, however, the way that al-Ramli used the term suggests otherwise. When it is brought up, he never defines the term, and uses it only in passing, suggesting that his audience would have an understanding of what he meant.

Khayr al-Din al-Ramli is a descendant of Umar ibn al-Khattāb (Through his son Abdullah ibn Umar), the second Muslim Caliph after the prophet Muhammad's death. Today the Palestinian family, El Khairi-Farouki, trace back their ancestry to Khayr al-Din al Ramli.

== Bibliography ==
- Fay, Mary Ann (2002). "Biography as History: The Exemplary Life of Khayr al-Din al-Ramli". In Mary Ann Fay (ed.). Autobiography and the construction of identity and community in the Middle East. Palgrave Macmillan. pp. 9–18. ISBN 978-0-312-21966-6.
- Gerber, Haim (1994). State, society, and law in Islam: Ottoman law in comparative perspective. SUNY Press. pp. 83–84. ISBN 978-0-7914-1877-2.
- Gerber, Haim (1998). "'Palestine' and other Territorial Concepts in the 17th Century". International Journal of Middle East Studies. 30 (4): 563–572. doi:10.1017/s0020743800052569. S2CID 162982234.
- Gerber, Haim (1998). "Rigidity Versus Openness in Late Classical Islamic Law: The case of the Seventeenth-Century Palestinian Mufti Khayr al-Din al-Ramli". Islamic Law and Society. 5 (2): 165–195. doi:10.1163/1568519982599481. JSTOR 3399339.
- Islahi, Abdul Azim. "Works of Economic Interest in the Seventeenth Century Muslim World". Thoughts on Economics. 18 (2): 35–50.
