= Lajjun Sanjak =

Ottoman province from 1559 to mid-1700s

- Sanjak of the Ottoman Empire
- 1559–18th century
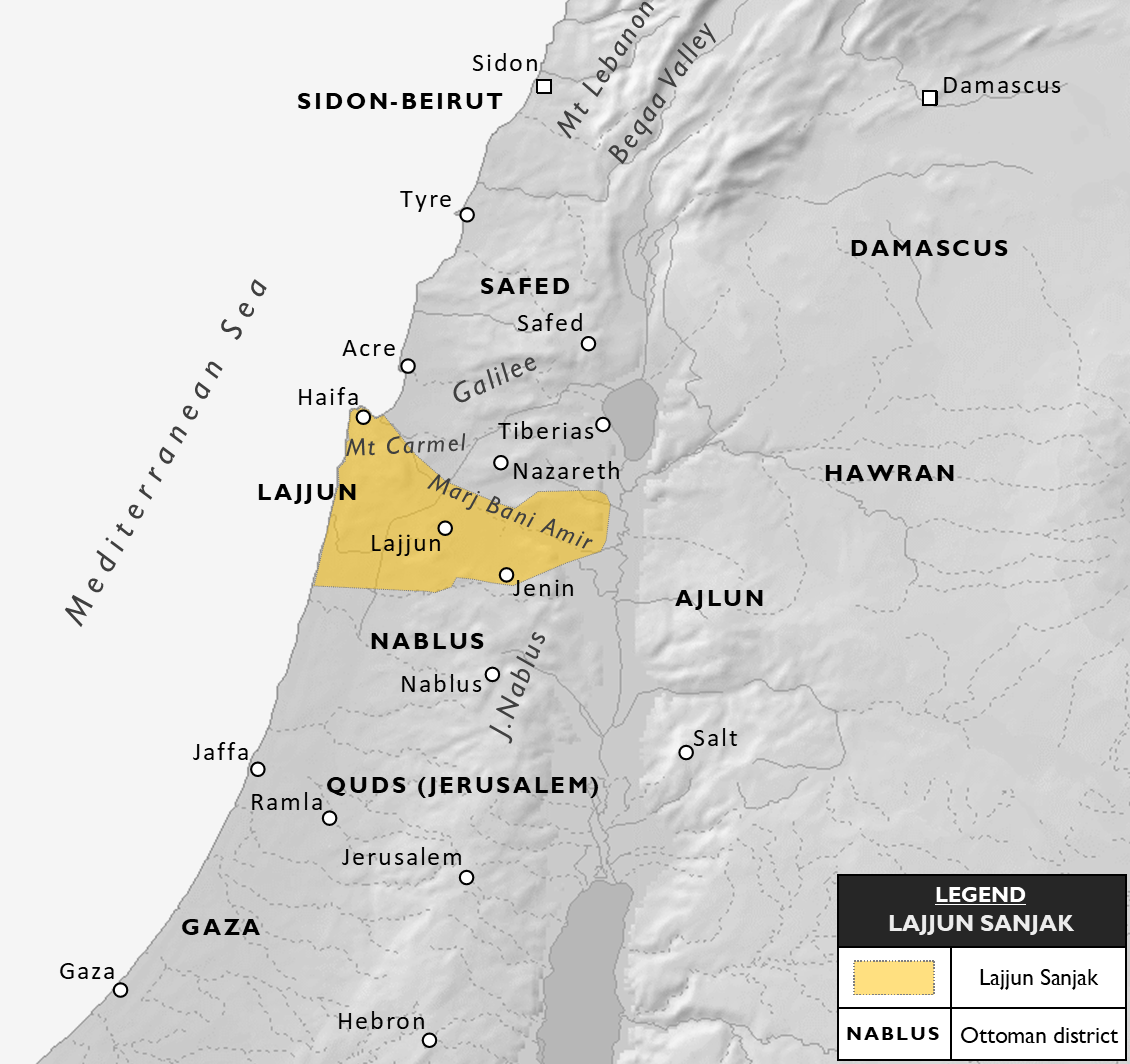
- 16th-century map
- Capital: Lajjun
- Area
  - Coordinates: 32°35′N 35°10′E
- Government: Turabay dynasty
- Historical era: Ottoman Palestine
  - Established: 1559
  - Disestablished: 18th century
- Contained within
  - Eyalet: Damascus
Succeeded by
Acre Sanjak
- Today part of: Israel, Palestine

Lajjun Sanjak was a sanjak of Damascus Eyalet from 1559 to the mid-18th century when it and the neighboring Ajlun Sanjak were combined to form the Jenin Sanjak. The sanjak was centered in Lajjun and later Jenin. Its territory consisted of the part of northern Palestine spanning the Jezreel Valley (then known as 'Marj ibn Amir'), Mount Carmel, and the coastland between Haifa and Atlit. From its establishment through the late 17th century, it was dominated by the Turabay dynasty, whose members served as its governors for most of this period.

== History ==
The Lajjun Sanjak was formed out of the area referred to in the Ottoman sources as the Iqta of Turabay. This iqta consisted of the nahiyas (subdistricts) of Atlit and Marj Bani Amir (the modern Jezreel Valley). Both nahiyas had been part of the Mamluk province of Safed but were administratively detached from Safed after the Ottomans conquered the region in 1516–1517. The historian Harold Rhode speculates the administratively separate Iqta was established to reward or pacify the Turabay family, the leaders of the Bedouin tribe of Banu Haritha who dominated the area and allied with the Ottomans during their conquest of the Mamluk empire. According to the historian Beshara Doumani, the Lajjun Sanjak, unlike the other sanjaks in the Palestine region, was "carved out for primarily political and strategic reasons". The crucial Damascus–Cairo highway and the coastal Via Maris passed through the territory which the Ottomans "set aside" for the Turabays, who were entrusted with securing the two roads.

== Bibliography ==
- Doumani, B. (1995). Rediscovering Palestine: Merchants and Peasants in Jabal Nablus. University of California Press.
- Rhode, H. (1979). The Administration and Population of the Sancak of Safad in the Sixteenth Century (PhD). Columbia University.
