= Taynal =

Sayf ad-Din Taynal an-Nasiri al-Ashrafi (d. 1343) was a prominent emir and mamluk of an-Nasir Muhammad, the Bahri Mamluk sultan of Egypt. He served as the Na'ib of Tripoli for three terms, and Gaza for one term, in the mid-14th-century during the reign of al-Nasir Muhammad. He ordered the construction of the large Taynal Mosque in Tripoli in 1336.

== Early life ==
According to historian as-Safadi, Taynal was a mamluk of al-Ashraf Khalil, while historian al-Maqrizi writes that Taynal's allegiance was to an-Nasir Muhammad. His full title includes both nisbahs "al-Ashrafi" and "an-Nasiri."

== Governor of Tripoli and Gaza ==
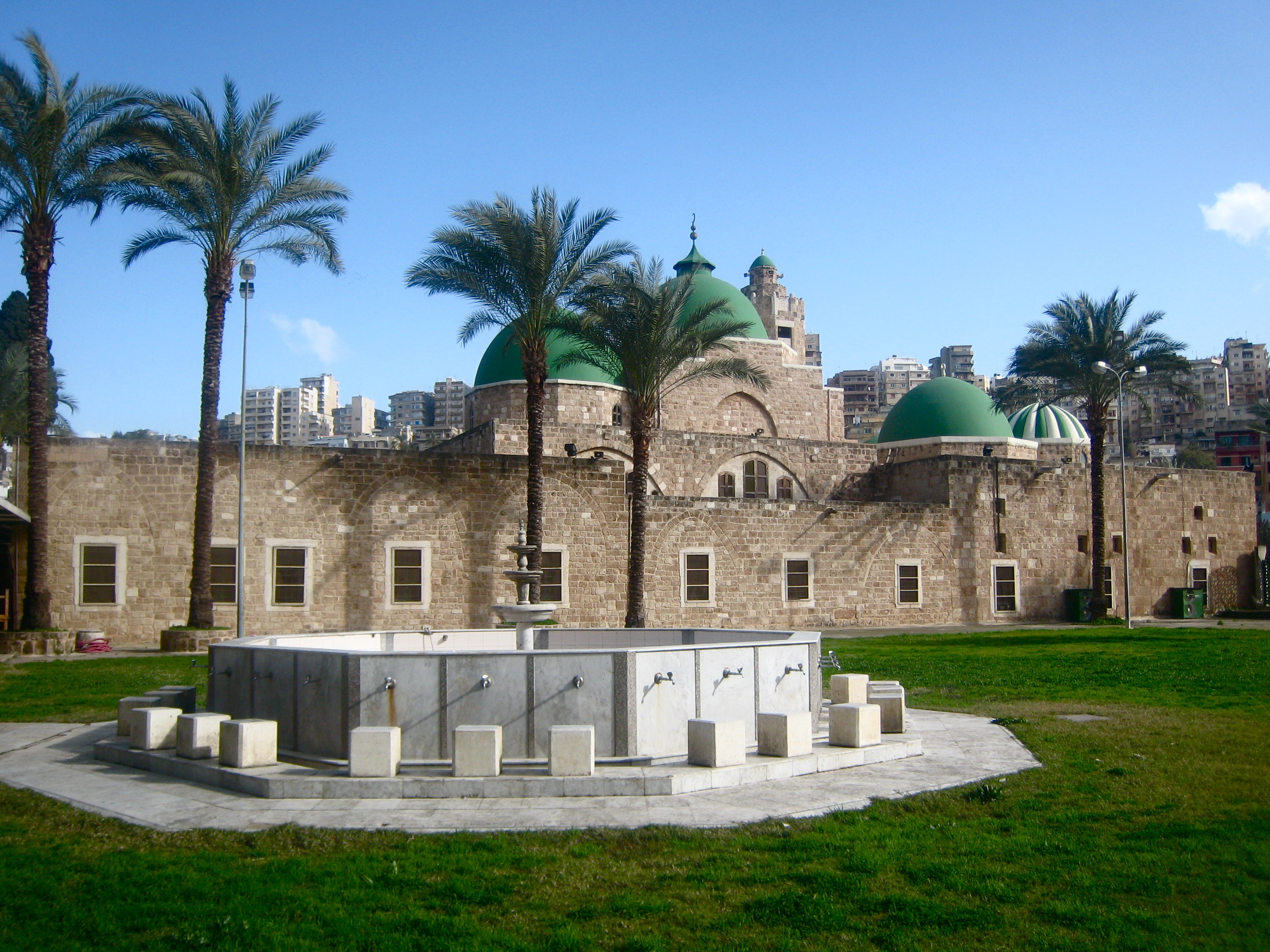
Taynal Mosque, in Tripoli, Lebanon

On 9 May 1326 Taynal replaced Qaratay as Na'ib ("governor") of Mamlakat Tarabulus (Tripoli Province) after being appointed by Tankiz, the Viceroy of Syria. Throughout his first term as governor, Taynal opposed some of Tankiz's policies, arousing the latter's anger. As punishment, Tankiz demoted Taynal, assigning him to the post of Na'ib of Gaza. Taynal replaced Tuluntari al-Jukandari by Muharram 733 (September/October 1332). Gaza was a less important province, the powers of its governor having been reduced in concurrence with Taynal's appointment.

In 1335 relations between Taynal and Tankiz had warmed, and Taynal was reassigned as Na'ib of Tripoli. It was during this term, in 1336, that Taynal had the famous mosque bearing his name constructed. Waqf ("religious endowment") documents in the mosque indicate that he maintained vast wealth. The 14th-century traveler Ibn Batutah wrote of the lavishness of the transportation convoys Taynal used in Tripoli. He resided in a mansion known as Dar al-Saadah (Abode of Felicity). Taynal had a house for himself built on the site of an "old Fatimid hospital," as noted by Ibn Batutah, near the al-Azhar Mosque in Cairo and also maintained a residence in Damascus, which later became a religious school known as "Madrasah Taynaliyya."

When Tankiz was deposed in 1340, Taynal was stripped of his governorship, but was reappointed in 1341. He served out his third term as governor until his death in Damascus in 1343. Although the Taynal Mosque in Tripoli was also intended to be a mausoleum for Taynal, he was buried in Damascus.

Aruqtay was appointed as Governor of Tripoli when Taynal was dismissed.

== Bibliography ==
- Hakluyt Society (1958). Works Issued by the Hakluyt Society. The Society.
- Mayer, L.A. (1933). Saracenic Heraldry: A Survey. Oxford: Oxford University Press.
- Sharon, M. (2009). Corpus Inscriptionum Arabicarum Palaestinae, G. Vol. 4. BRILL. ISBN 978-90-04-17085-8.
