= Najm al-Din al-Ghazzi =

Levantine Islamic scholar (1570–1651)

Najm al-Din Muhammad al-Ghazzi (19 January 1570–1651) was a scholar based in Damascus during Ottoman rule. He is best known for his biographical dictionaries. The biographies were mainly about the notables of Syria and, to a lesser extent, those of Egypt and other parts of the Ottoman Empire in the 16th and 17th centuries.

== Family background ==
Ghazzi came from a family of Muslim scholars long based in Damascus. They were originally from Gaza, hence their nisba 'al-Ghazzi'. (Note: According to Suha-Taji Farouki, the family migrated to Damascus from Gaza ten generations before al-Ghazzi's father.) His grandfather Radi al-Din al-Ghazzi (1458–1529) was the deputy qadi (judge) of the Shafi'i madhhab (Islamic school of jurisprudence) and an important figure in the Sufi Qadiriyya order in the late 15th and early 16th century, during the ending years of Mamluk rule and the beginnings of Ottoman rule. (Note: Radi al-Din's full name was Rāḍī al-Dīn Abū al-Faḍl Muḥammad ibn Rāḍī al-Dīn Abū al-Barakāt Muḥammad ibn Aḥmad ibn ʿAbd Allāh ibn Badr al-Ghazzī al-Dimashqī al-ʿĀmirī al-Qurashī al-Shāfiʿī.) He had lost his position at some point before or during the political transition, but regained it by developing close ties with the Ottoman government. He penned works about Sufism, aqida (creed), agriculture and plants, medicine, and Arabic grammar.

Radi al-Din's son Badr al-Din was Ghazzi's father. Badr al-Din, born in 1499, received an elite education in the Mamluk capital Cairo, including instruction by al-Suyuti. He started his career as a scholar in Damascus around 1515. He eventually became the Shafi'i mufti of Damascus and an instructor in the Umayyad Mosque. He wrote one of the first Arabic travel accounts of Constantinople, the Ottoman capital, and the places along the way, called al-Matali al-badriyya fi al-manazil al-Rumiyya (Full Moon Rising: Waystations to Constantinople) during his visit in 1530–1531. By the time of his death in 1577, he had become among the preeminent scholars of Damascus, best known for his tafsirs (interpretations of Islamic scripture) and his fatwas (legal opinions).

== Life ==
The only known biography of Ghazzi himself is by his Damascene contemporary Muhammad Amin al-Muhibbi. Ghazzi, born on 19 January 1570, was the youngest of his siblings. He was a young boy when his father died, but he considerably documented his father's life and works in his own career as a scholar in Damascus.

His father was his first teacher, and after his death, Ghazzi's mother became responsible for his education. His teachers were leading ulema. The first among them was the Hanafi mufti of Damascus, followed by the Shafi'i mufti Shihab al-Din Ahmad al-Ithawi, who instructed Ghazzi for thirty-five years. He eventually married al-Ithawi's daughter, and when she died of an illness, al-Ithawi married off his other daughter to him. Other teachers of Ghazzi included the Arab scholar Muhibbidin ibn Abi Bakr al-Hamawi, the Turkish head Ottoman qadi of Damascus Muhammad ibn Hassan al-Su'udi, and the Egyptian scholars Zayn al-Din al-Bakri and Muhammad ibn Ahmad al-Ramli. Like his father and grandfather, Ghazzi was a Sufi of the Qadiriyya.

Ghazzi became a highly reputable scholar and teacher in several madrasas, and at times served as a mufti, imam, and Friday prayer khatib (preacher). He traveled to different parts of Syria and Palestine and made the Hajj pilgrimage to Mecca on twelve occasions. His reputation in the Hejaz was as the 'hadith scholar of the age' and as 'the scholar of al-Sham [Syria]'.

Ghazzi became afflicted with a light paralysis around 1644. He died in the home of his wife (not a daughter of al-Ithawi) on 8 June 1657.

== Works ==
Ghazzi wrote a dictionary of biographies of scholars and other important figures of his father's generation. The work was called al-Kawakib al-sa'ira bi a'yan al-m'ia wa ashara (The Wandering Stars: The Notables of the Tenth Century [AH]). He wrote a supplementary work, mainly biographies of his contemporaries, titled Lutf al-samar wa qatf al-thamar min tarajim al-tabaqat al-ula min al-qarn al-hadi ashar.

His biographical works were mainly devoted to notables from greater Syria, but there were also several entries about figures from Egypt and the Ottoman Empire in general. In Kawakib, Ghazzi cited his sources in his introduction, discussing the books used and their authors, and in the individual entries. In Lutf, Ghazzi did not source or verify historical information, as it was mostly based on his own observations of his contemporaries. Kawakib contained 1,543 biographies, divided into three volumes by generation, which he defined as thirty-three years, citing a hadith by Muhammad. The chronological range of the work was notables who died between 1494 and 1592. Lutf was intended as a continuation of Kawakib and contains 283 biographies.

In each entry, Ghazzi generally mentioned the subject's genealogy, lifespan, residence, and burial place, madhhab, posts, characteristics and values, and notables events of their life. While extensive entries were devoted to especially notable subjects, several entries consisted of no more than two lines. Among the entries in Kawakib and Lutf, were seven Ottoman sultans: Beyezid II, Selim I, Suleiman, Selim II, Murad III, Murad III, and Ahmed I.

The original works are located in the Zahiriyya Library of Damascus. An edited version of al-Kawakib was published by J. S. Jabbur in Beirut in 1945–1958. Al-Kawakib was published, in Arabic, by the author Mahmud Shaykh in Damascus in two volumes in 1981 and 1982, respectively.

Ghazzi also wrote three travelogues of his trips to Constantinople, Baalbek and the Hejaz. The Constantinople work Al-Iqd al-manzum fi al-rihla ila al-Rum is located in the Köprülü Library in Istanbul. The Baalbek work is no longer extant, but was centered around an official mission he participated in to gauge the situation there in 1618 amid the domination of the region by the Druze chief and district governor Fakhr al-Din II. The Hejaz travelogue is centered around one of his Hajj pilgrimages, in which describes the way stations between Damascus and Mecca. It is located in the Zahiriyya Library in Damascus.

== Descendants ==
A descendant of Ghazzi, Muhammad Kamal al-Din al-Ghazzi (1760–1799), wrote a long biography of another of his relatives, the Sufi scholar and traveler Abd al-Ghani al-Nabulsi called al-Wird al-unsi wa l-warid al-qudsi fi tarjamat al-arif Abd al-Ghani al-Nabulsi (The Intimate Invocation and Sacred Revelation in Writing the Life of the Knower Abd al-Ghani al-Nabulsi).

== Bibliography ==
- Akkach, Samer (2012). Intimate Invocations: Al-Ghazzī's Biography of 'Abd al-Ghanī al-Nābulusī. Leiden and Boston: Brill. ISBN 978-90-04-21141-4.
- Abu-Husayn, Abdul-Rahim (1985). Provincial Leaderships in Syria, 1575–1650. Beirut: American University of Beirut. ISBN 978-0-8156-6072-9. OCLC 242675094.
- Escovitz, Joseph H. (October–December 1977). "A Lost Arabic Source for the History of Early Ottoman Egypt". Journal of the American Oriental Society. 97 (4): 513–518. doi:10.2307/598633. JSTOR 598633.
- Pfeifer, Helen (2022). Empire of Salons: Conquest and Community in Early Modern Ottoman Lands. Princeton: Princeton University Press. ISBN 9780691195230.
- Taji-Farouki, Suha (2006). ʿIbn Arabī: A Prayer for Spiritual Elevation and Protection. Oxford: Anqa Publishing. ISBN 0-9534513-0-5.
