= Ridwan Pasha =

Ottoman politician

Ridwan ibn Mustafa Pasha

Beylerbey of Anatolia
- In office 1582/83 – 2 April 1585
- Monarch: Murad III

Beylerbey of Habesh
- In office March 1573 – July 1574
- Monarch: Selim II

Beylerbey of Yemen (Note: Coinciding with Ridwan Pasha's appointment to Yemen Eyalet, the province was divided into two separate administrative units, Tihama and Sana'a, with Ridwan Pasha being appointed to the latter.)
- In office November 1564 – April 1567
- Monarch: Selim II
- Preceded by: Mahmud Pasha
- Succeeded by: Hasan Pasha

Sanjak-bey of Gaza
- In office 1570/71 – March 1573
- Monarch: Selim II
- Succeeded by: Ahmad ibn Ridwan
- In office Early 1560s – November 1564
- Monarch: Suleiman I

Personal details
- Died: 2 April 1585 Anatolia
- Resting place: Aleppo
- Relations: Ridwan dynasty

Military service
- Allegiance: Ottoman Empire

Riḍwān ibn Muṣṭafā ibn ʿAbd al-Muʿīn Pasha (Turkish transliteration: Ridvan Pasha; died 2 April 1585) was a 16th-century Ottoman statesman. He served terms as governor of Gaza in the early 1560s and in 1570–1573, Yemen in 1564/65–1567, Habesh and Jeddah in 1573–1574 and Anatolia in 1582/83 until his death. During his term in Yemen, Ottoman authority largely collapsed. Ridwan Pasha was the progenitor of the Ridwan dynasty, which chose Gaza as its family headquarters, and where members of the dynasty ruled almost consecutively until 1690.

== Biography ==
=== Early career ===
Ridwan was the son of Kara Şahin Mustafa Pasha, a Bosnian kapikulu (slave of the Sublime Porte) and later statesman, who served gubernatorial terms in the eyalets (provinces) of Erzurum (1544–1545), Diyarbakir (1548), Yemen (1556–1560) and Egypt (1562/63–1565/66). Early in his career, Ridwan was made defterdar (treasurer) of Yemen, after gaining the recommendation of Mahmud Pasha. In the following years, he was assigned sanjak-bey (district governor) of Gaza.

=== Governor of Yemen ===
In November 1564, after paying a bribe of 50,000 gold pieces, he was appointed beylerbey (governor-general) of Yemen, replacing Mahmud Pasha, who bribed the Sublime Porte to gain the governorship of Egypt. According to historian Clive Smith, the large sum that Ridwan Pasha paid for the governorship was attributed to his expectation of accumulating large wealth as governor of the province. His predecessor Mahmud Pasha had governed Yemen for seven years, during which he and his subordinates ruled corruptly, plundering the province's gold and extorting the local inhabitants. Prior to his dismissal, Mahmud Pasha had succeeded in persuading the Sublime Porte to divide Yemen into two separate provinces: Sana'a, which consisted of the interior highlands, and Tihama, which consisted of the province's central and southern coastal plains. According to the 16th-century Arab chronicler al-Nahrawali al-Makki, Mahmud Pasha's motivation was to leave Ridwan Pasha to govern the restive highlands, while virtually appointing a subordinate of his to Tihama with its lucrative Red Sea ports. The Sublime Porte may have agreed to the division out of the belief that a single governor for each of Yemen's two regions would serve to help the Ottomans prevent Portuguese attempts to control Yemeni ports and ensure Ottoman control over the coffee trade, which was primarily cultivated in the highlands.

In 1565, Ridwan Pasha reached a deal with the Sublime Porte in which his trade of Yemeni spices through Jeddah to Egyptian markets would be exempted from taxation in lieu of his annual gubernatorial salary. In this case, "spices" was synonymous with coffee, the trade of which, since the mid-16th century, financed the salaries of the Ottoman garrisons in Yemen. The coffee was grown in areas dominated by the Ismaili (a sect of Shia Muslims) tribes. Ridwan co-opted the chief Ismaili da'i (missionary), giving him and his family several tax farms.

As intended by Mahmud Pasha, the division of Yemen highly restricted Ridwan Pasha's personal financial ambitions because his rule was effectively limited to the fortresses of Sana'a and Saadah, with no control over the Red Sea ports. He thus sought to renegotiate a deal made by his father, Kara Shahin Mustafa (r. 1556–1560), with the Zaydi (a sect of Shia Islam) imam, al-Mutahhar, calling for extending taxation to the Zaidi-dominated northern highlands, where al-Mutahhar ruled virtually autonomously. Al-Mutahhar refused Ridwan Pasha's demands and opened a rebellion against Ottoman authority in 1566. By January 1567, all of Sana'a province with the exception of the fortresses of Sana'a and Amran had been conquered by al-Mutahhar's Zaidi tribesmen. Ridwan Pasha then called for a truce with al-Mutahhar, whose forces blocked all the roads to Sana'a to prevent the intervention of a potential Ottoman relief force.

Ridwan Pasha was dismissed from Yemen in April 1567, and was replaced by Hasan Pasha. His dismissal prompted him to head for Constantinople, capital of the empire, to argue his case with the Sublime Porte. He was consequently reprimanded and imprisoned. However, his incarceration was relatively short and he was pardoned in November 1567 when it was discovered that Mahmud Pasha had intercepted and concealed letters from Ridwan Pasha to the Sublime Porte, alerting the imperial authorities of the volatile situation in Yemen; Ottoman authority had largely collapsed in Yemen during Ridwan Pasha's governorship. The concealed letters were discovered after Mahmud Pasha was assassinated in Egypt.

=== Later career and death ===
In 1570/71, Ridwan Pasha was reappointed sanjak-bey of Gaza. Ridwan Pasha was then appointed beylerbey of Habesh and Jeddah, which included parts of Abyssinia and Hejaz, in March 1573. He remained in Gaza for a few months after his reassignment to ensure that arrangements he made with the Sublime Porte regarding the transferring of tax revenues or grain harvests from Qasr Ibrim and its territories to Habesh Eyalet from Egypt Eyalet were confirmed. He demanded further concessions from the Sublime Porte to redirect grain harvests from Egypt to the coffers of Habesh's treasury in June 1574. He was dismissed from Habesh in July 1574.

Sometime following his dismissal from Habesh, he served terms as beylerbey of Diyarbakir and then Basra. In 1579, he was a commander in the Ottoman military campaign against the Safavids in the Caucasus Mountains. As a reward for his service, the Sublime Porte appointed Ridwan Pasha to the major eyalet of Anatolia in late 1582 or early 1583. He died in office on 2 April 1585. Ridwan Pasha and his brother Bahram Pasha (died 1586), also an Ottoman statesman, were buried in a mausoleum situated in the garden of a mosque in Aleppo. The mausoleum was restored in 1924 by Abdullah Bek al-'Ilmi, a descendant of Bahram Pasha. It is unclear why Ridwan Pasha chose to be buried in Aleppo.

== Legacy ==
Ridwan Pasha (or his kinsmen) evidently made Gaza the headquarters of his family, although the reason why is not provided in the biographies of Ridwan Pasha and Kara Shahin Mustafa which were written by their contemporaries. Ridwan Pasha's son, Ahmad Pasha, succeeded him as sanjak-bey of Gaza, a post he held for roughly 30 years, after which his sons and grandsons virtually inherited the governance of the district. Ridwan Pasha became the progenitor of a dynasty bearing his name, the Ridwan dynasty, whose members governed Gaza almost consecutively between 1570 and 1690.

== Bibliography ==
- Blackburn, J. R. (1994). "Ridwan Pasha". In Gibb, Hamilton Alexander Rosskeen; Kramers, Johannes Hendrik; Lewis, Bernard; Pellat, Charles; Schacht, Joseph (eds.). The Encyclopaedia of Islam: Volume 8, Parts139-140. Brill. ISBN 9789004095519.
- Clark, Victoria (2010). Yemen: Dancing on the Heads of Snakes. Yale University Press. ISBN 9780300167344.
- Filiu, Jean-Pierre (2014). Gaza: A History. Oxford University Press. ISBN 9780190201890.
- Hathaway, Jane (2003). Tale of Two Factions, A: Myth, Memory, and Identity in Ottoman Egypt and Yemen. State University of New York Press. ISBN 9780791486108.
- Nahrawali, Muhammad ibn Ahmad (2002). Smith, Clive (ed.). Lightning Over Yemen: A History of the Ottoman Campaign in Yemen, 1569–71. I. B. Tauris. ISBN 9781860648366.
- Watenpaugh, Heghnar (1999). The Image of an Ottoman City: Imperial Architecture and the Representation of Urban Life in Aleppo in the Sixteenth and Seventeenth Centuries. University of California. ISBN 9004124543.
- Ze'evi, Dror (2012). An Ottoman century: the district of Jerusalem in the 1600s. SUNY Press. ISBN 978-0-7914-2915-0.
