= Martin A. Meyer =

American rabbi (1879–1923)

Martin Abraham Meyer (January 15, 1879 – June 27, 1923) was an American rabbi.

== Life ==
Meyer was born on January 15, 1879, in San Francisco, California, the son of Charles Meyer and Louisa Silberstein.

Meyer attended public school in San Francisco and graduated from Lowell High School in 1895. He was a disciple of Jacob Voorsanger, the rabbi of Congregation Emanu-El, and with his encouragement he went to Hebrew Union College in Cincinnati, Ohio. He graduated with an A.B. degree from the University of Cincinnati in 1899, where he graduated with honors and was a member of Phi Beta Kappa. In 1901, he was the honor man and valedictorian of his class when he graduated from Hebrew Union College with a B.D. After graduating, he became a Fellow of the American School of Oriental Study and Research in Palestine in Jerusalem. He was there from 1901 to 1902, studying archaeology, ethnology, and Semitic philology while writing several important articles for Jewish periodicals on the condition of Jews in the Holy Land. He also received a Ph.D. from Columbia University in 1906, where he was a student of Professor Richard Gottheil.

Meyer was rabbi of Congregation Beth Emeth in Albany, New York, from 1902 to 1906, Temple Israel in Brooklyn from 1906 to 1910, and Congregation Emanu-El in San Francisco from 1910 until his death. While serving as rabbi in the latter congregation, he became one of the leading rabbis of the Pacific Coast. He was president of the California Conference of Social Work, the Big Brother Movement of San Francisco, the Pacific Coast Branch of the Jewish Chautauqua, and the Young Men's Hebrew Association. He was a member of the California Commission of Charities and Corrections from 1911 to 1920, serving as its president for eight years, and a vice-president of the Jewish Publication Society of America. During World War I, he served with the American Red Cross in France from 1918 to 1919. He was also a member of, among other national Jewish committees, the American Jewish Congress, the Zionist Organization of America, and the Palestine Restoration Fund.

Meyer's 1907 dissertation, History of the City of Gaza, was a scholarly work on Arabic Semitic culture. In 1904, he wrote the article "Jerusalem-Modern" for The Jewish Encyclopedia. He also wrote an introduction to I. M. Wise's Sermons and Addresses by Jacob Voorsanger in 1913, a pamphlet for the Central Conference of American Rabbis called Jew and Non-Jew in 1913, and a sketch of "Jews in California" that was in A. M. Voorsanger's Western Jewry in 1916. He was one of the few Reform rabbis at the time to openly support Zionism. Deeply interested in social service problems, he and I. Irving Lipsitch founded the Jewish Committee for Personal Service in State Institutions. He also wrote the two-volume Methods of Teaching Post-Biblical History and Literature in 1915. He helped organize small Jewish communities in the San Francisco area, and was a director of the Jewish Education Society of San Francisco.

Meyer was a director of the First Hebrew Congregation of Berkeley, a lecturer of Jewish history at the University of California from 1911 until his death, chairman of the North California branch of the Jewish Welfare Board, editor of Emanu-El in 1911 and an editorial contributor from 1913 until his death, and a member of the Commonwealth Club, the Faculty Club, the Concordia Club, the Beresford Club, the American Jewish Historical Society, the Society of Biblical Literature and Exegesis, and the American Oriental Society. He was the commencement speaker at the University of California in 1920, and in 1921 he delivered the convention address at the biennial Union of American Hebrew Congregations convention and the baccalaureate address before the graduating Hebrew Union College class.

Meyer was an organizer of the Brooklyn Federation of Jewish Charities. He lectured at Leland Stanford University, the University of Nevada, and Hahnemann Medical College several times. He cooperated with the Menorah Society at the University of California in arranging its cultural programs. He gave special seminars in Berkeley and San Francisco for students planning on entering the rabbinate. His library of Judaica and general religious and philosophical literature was one of the largest private collections in the country. He was a director of the San Francisco branch of the Archaeological Institute of America and a member of the board of consulting editors of the Menorah Journal when it was launched in 1915.

In 1905, Meyer married Jennie May Haas of Cincinnati. Their children were Adolph and Louise.

Meyer died at home in his study on June 27, 1923. It was initially believed he died from heart disease, but his physicians said his heart was fine and the autopsy revealed he died from cyanide poison. Murder was suspected as the cause, but it was later concluded he was accidentally poisoned after mounting a Mexican butterfly he received that day; he was an amateur entomologist with one of the largest collections of giant moths and butterflies in the Pacific coast, and at the time a solution of cyanide was used to preserve insects after mounting them. Hundreds of people attended his funeral at Congregation Emanu-El. He was buried in the Home of Peace Cemetery.

Shortly after Meyer's death, his friends collected $25,000 for the Martin A. Meyer Memorial Fund for needy Jewish students in the University of California.
