= Ahmad Pasha ibn Ridwan =

Ahmad ibn Ridwan Pasha

Sanjak-bey of Gaza
- In office 1585–1605
- Monarchs: Murad III; Mehmed III; Ahmed I
- Preceded by: Ridwan Pasha
- Succeeded by: 'Arap Hasan Pasha

Personal details
- Died: 1607
- Relations: Ridwan dynasty: Ridwan Pasha (father); 'Arap Hasan Pasha (son)

Military service
- Allegiance: Ottoman Empire
- Commands: Amir al-hajj (intermittently in the late 16th and early 17th centuries)

Ahmad ibn Ridwan (Arabic: أحمد بن رضوان ʾAḥmad ibn Riḍwān) (died 1607), better known as Ahmad Pasha, was the governor of the Damascus Eyalet in the early 17th century. Before that, he was governor of the Gaza Sanjak, a subprovince of Damascus, for nearly 30 years.

== Governor of Gaza ==
Ahmad Pasha was the son of Ridwan ibn Mustafa Pasha, who founded the Ridwan dynasty, which governed southern Palestine for nearly two centuries. Ahmad acquired the governorship of Gaza Sanjak in 1585, following the death of Ridwan Pasha in Anatolia. Ahmad chose Gaza to be the center of the Ridwan dynasty. He continued his relatively autonomous rule of the district—which at times included Jerusalem and Nablus in central Palestine—until 1605. During this period, he was also given the prestigious role of amir al-hajj by the Ottoman state.

The Arabic biographer Muhammad al-Muhibbi described Ahmad Pasha as a "courageous" and "brilliant" man with a great understanding of history and science. Poets of the time wrote songs praising his knowledge. During his rule as Gaza's governor, the city became a regional cultural center. Its religious significance was boosted by Ahmad Pasha's scholarly pursuits in Islamic theology and by the influence of his close friend and adviser Khayr al-Din al-Ramli, an important Islamic jurist in the region who he befriended in 1603.

== Governor of Damascus ==
Unlike his father, Ahmad Pasha had to lobby for the position of beylerbey ("provincial governor") of the Damascus Eyalet. According to Arab historian Rifaat Abu al-Haj, Ahmad Pasha had to send to gifts and large sums of money to "countless vezirs and bureaucrats" in the Ottoman capital Istanbul before being awarded the province in 1601. During his rule, Ahmad Pasha became a patron of Muslim jurists and is known to have regularly consulted the 'ulema, high-ranking Muslim scholars, on provincial affairs. Abu al-Haj wrote that by the time Ahmad Pasha had gained the governorship of Damascus, Ahmad had grown old. He died, while still in power, in 1607. Following his death, Ahmad's son Hasan "'Arab" Pasha inherited the governorship of Gaza and took part in putting down the revolt of Fakhr-al-Din II in modern-day Lebanon.

== Legacy ==
In the al-Aqsa Compound, there are three khalwas (chambers for spiritual retreat) near the Dome of the Rock that are named after him: the Western Khalwa of Aḥmad Pasha, Eastern Khalwa of Aḥmad Pasha and Eastern Khalwa (al-Aḥmadiyya Madrasa), al-Aḥmadiyya being Aḥmad plus the nisba suffix.

In addition, he also likely was a mediator in the construction of the al-Junblāṭiyya Khalwa, also in the al-Aqsa Compound.

== See also ==
- Husayn Pasha

== Bibliography ==
- Fay, Mary Ann (2002). "Biography as History: The Exemplary Life of Khayr al-Din al-Ramli". In Mary Ann Fay (ed.). Autobiography and the construction of identity and community in the Middle East. Palgrave Macmillan. pp. 9–18. ISBN 978-0-312-21966-6.
- Ze'evi, Dror (1996). An Ottoman century: the district of Jerusalem in the 1600s. SUNY Press. ISBN 0-7914-2915-6.
