= Laurent d'Arvieux =

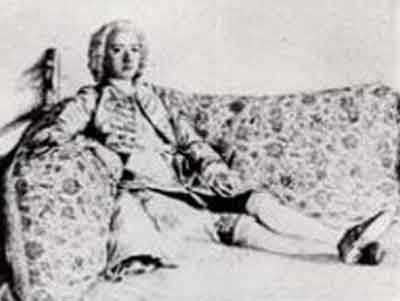
- D'Arvieux in 1672
- Born: 2 June 1635
- Died: 30 October 1702 (aged 67)

Laurent d'Arvieux (French pronunciation: [lɔʁɑ̃ daʁvjø]; 2 June 1635 – 30 October 1702) was a French traveller and diplomat born in Marseille.

Arvieux is known for his travels in the Middle East, which began in 1654 as a merchant in the Ottoman port of Smyrna. From 1658 he travelled throughout the Levant (Lebanon, Syria and Palestine) and in 1666 visited Tunis. Later he returned to France, and in 1674–75 was assigned as consul to Algiers, then later served as consul to Aleppo from 1679 to 1686.

During Arvieux's travels he was witness to 17th-century Arab and Turkish societies, and gained important insight involving all facets of their culture and customs. He also familiarized himself with the languages of the region, and learned to speak Arabic, Turkish, Persian, Hebrew and Syriac languages. Because of his knowledge of Turkish manners and dress he collaborated with Molière on the development of Le Bourgeois gentilhomme.

At the time of Arvieux's death, he left behind a manuscript of his memoirs, a portion of which was edited by Jean de la Roque (1661–1745) and published in 1717 as Voyage dans la Palestine. Later Arvieux's memoirs were edited and published in their entirety by Jean-Baptiste Labat (1663–1738) as Mémoires du chevalier d'Arvieux (6 volumes, 1735). An English account of his travels was published in 1962 by Warren Lewis, entitled Levantine Adventurer: The Travels and Missions of the Chevalier d'Arvieux 1653-1697.

== Works, in French ==
- d'Arvieux, Laurent (1717). Voyage fait par ordre du roy Louis XIV. dans la Palestine, vers le Grand Emir, chef des princes arabes du desert, connus sous le nom de Bedouïns ... où il est traité des moeurs & des coutumes de cette nation. Avec la description generale de l'Arabie. Paris: Chez André Cailleau.
- d'Arvieux, Laurent (1718). Voyage dans la Palestine, vers le grand emir, chef des princes arabes du desert connus sous le nom de Bedouïns. Amsterdam: Steenhouwer & Uytwerf.
  - Alt:
  - d'Arvieux, Laurent (1718). Voyage dans la Palestine, vers le grand emir, chef des princes arabes du desert, connus sous le nom de Bedouïns, ou d'Arabes Scenites, qui se disent la vraïe posterité d'Ismaël fils d'Abraham. Fait par ordre du roi Louis 14. avec la description general de l'Arabie, faite par le sultan Ismael Abulfeda, traduite en françois s. Amsterdam: Steenhouwer & Uytwerf.
- d'Arvieux, Laurent (1735). Mémoires du chevalier d'Arvieux. Vol. 1. Paris: C.J.B.Delespine.
- d'Arvieux, Laurent (1735). Mémoires du chevalier d'Arvieux. Vol. 2. Paris: C.J.B.Delespine.
- d'Arvieux, Laurent (1735). Mémoires du chevalier d'Arvieux. Vol. 3. Paris: C.J.B.Delespine.
- d'Arvieux, Laurent (1735). Mémoires du chevalier d'Arvieux. Vol. 4. Paris: C.J.B.Delespine.
- d'Arvieux, Laurent (1735). Mémoires du chevalier d'Arvieux. Vol. 5. Paris: C.J.B.Delespine.
- d'Arvieux, Laurent (1735). Mémoires du chevalier d'Arvieux. Vol. 6. Paris: C.J.B.Delespine.

== Works, in English ==
- d'Arvieux, Laurent (1718). Voyage fait par ordre du louis XIV. dans la Palestine. English]. The Chevailer d'Arvieux's travels in Arabia the Desart; written by himself,. Undertaken by order of the late French king To which is added, A general description of Arabia, by Sultan Ismael Abulfeda, Done into English by An eminent hand. London: B.Barker & C.King.
- (1732) The travels of the chevalier d'Arvieux in Arabia the desart (translation of Voyage dans la Palestine), 2nd edition, at HathiTrust
