= Al-Muhibbi =

Muhammad al-Amin ibn Fadlallah ibn Muhiballah ibn Muhibb al-Din al-Dimashqi, commonly known as al-Muhibbi was an Ottoman historian based in Damascus. He is best known for voluminous dictionary of biographies of 17th-century Muslim notables.

== Biography ==
Muhibbi was born in Damascus in 1651 to a scholarly family from the Hanafi madhhab, the Islamic school of law favored by the Ottoman state, which conquered the Levant in 1516. His great-grandfather Muhibb al-Din Muhammad was originally from Hama and served as a qadi (judge) in several northern Syrian towns, Cairo and an instructor in Damascus. (Note: Muhibb al-Din's full genealogy is Muhammad ibn Abi Bakr ibn Dawud ibn Abd al-Rahman ibn Abd al-Khaliq ibn Abd al-Rahman ibn Taqi al-Din al-Ulwani.)

Muhibbi moved to Beirut when his father Fadlallah ibn Muhiballah was appointed the qadi (head judge) of the city, a position he held until 1669. Muhibbi returned to live in Damascus on several occasions during this period. Sometime after his father died in 1671, he studied in Bursa for a short period, returning to Damascus in 1675.

He was patronized by the prominent qadi Muhammad ibn Lutfallah ibn Bayram al-Izzati, who had funded his studies in Bursa and later secured him an appointment as the qadi of Edirne. When Izzati became ill and resigned, Muhibbi accompanied him to the Ottoman capital Constantinople where he died in 1681.

Upon his return to Damascus shortly after his patron's death, Muhibbi began his writing career. After making the Hajj pilgrimage to Mecca in 1690 he was appointed a deputy qadi in Damascus and worked as an instructor in the Aminiyya Madrasa. He died in the city on 11 November 1699.

== Works ==
Muhibbi is best known for writing a collection of biographies about the notables of his lifetime and the preceding generation. His finished work consisted of 1,283 entries and was completed in 1685. He also had a draft work of biographies about notables from the Hejaz and Yemen. Muhibbi authored a second biographical work universal in scope. Among his sources were his Damascene near-contemporaries Najm al-Din al-Ghazzi's and al-Burini's biographical dictionaries. Muhibbi went further in scope, including many luminaries from the Hejaz, Yemen and Bahrayn, as well as India.

Having learned Turkish and Persian during his extensive time in Constantinople and Anatolia, he translated into Arabic numerous poems from the two languages. Muhibbi composed poetry himself was regarded by the 18th-century Damascene historian Khalil al-Muradi as highly talented and popular among his listeners.

== Bibliography ==
- Abu Hussein, Tarek Abdul Rahim (June 2010). Historians and Historical Thought in an Ottoman World: Biographical Writing in 16th and 17th Century Syria/Bilad al-Sham (PDF) (MA). Sabancı University.
- Brockelmann, C. (1993). Bosworth, C. E.; van Donzel, E.; Heinrichs, W. P. & Pellat, Ch. (eds.). The Encyclopaedia of Islam, Second Edition. Volume VII: Mif–Naz. Leiden: E. J. Brill. pp. 496–497. ISBN 978-90-04-09419-2.
