= Sanjak-bey =

Title given in the Ottoman Empire to a high-ranking officer

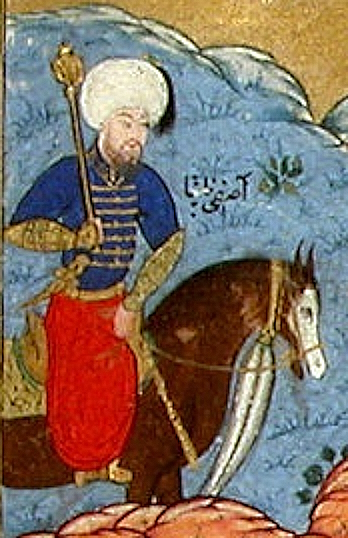
Asafi Pasha was a Sanjak-bey for Shirvan and Dagestan from 1588.

Sanjak-bey, sanjaq-bey or -beg (Ottoman Turkish: سنجاق بك, lit. 'lord of the standard') was the title given in the Seljuk Sultanate of Rum and the Ottoman Empire to a bey (a high-ranking officer, but usually not a pasha) appointed to the military and administrative command of a district (sanjak, in Arabic liwa’), hence the equivalent Arabic title of amir liwa (أمير لواء ’amīr liwā’) He was answerable to a superior wāli or another provincial governor. In a few cases the sanjak-bey was himself directly answerable to the Sultan in Constantinople.

Like other early Ottoman administrative offices, the sanjak-bey had a military origin: the term sanjak (and liva) means "flag" or "standard" and denoted the insigne around which, in times of war, the cavalrymen holding fiefs (timars or ziamets) in the specific district gathered. The sanjakbey was in turn subordinate to a beylerbey ("bey of beys") who governed an eyalet and commanded his subordinate sanjak-beys in war. In this way, the structure of command on the battlefield resembled the hierarchy of provincial government.

The office of sanjak-bey resembled that of the beylerbey on a more modest scale. Like the beylerbey, the sanjak-bey drew his income from a prebend, which consisted usually of revenues from the towns, quays and ports within the boundary of his sanjak. Within his own sanjak, a governor was responsible above all for maintaining order and, with the cooperation of the fief holders, arresting and punishing wrongdoers. For this, he usually received half of the fines imposed on miscreants, with the fief holder on whose lands the misdeed took place, receiving the other half. Sanjak governors also had other duties, for example, the pursuit of bandits, the investigation of heretics, the provision of supplies for the army, or the dispatch of materials for shipbuilding, as the sultan commanded.

== See also ==
- Mirliva
- Beg
- Beg Khan
