= Slavery in Cyprus =

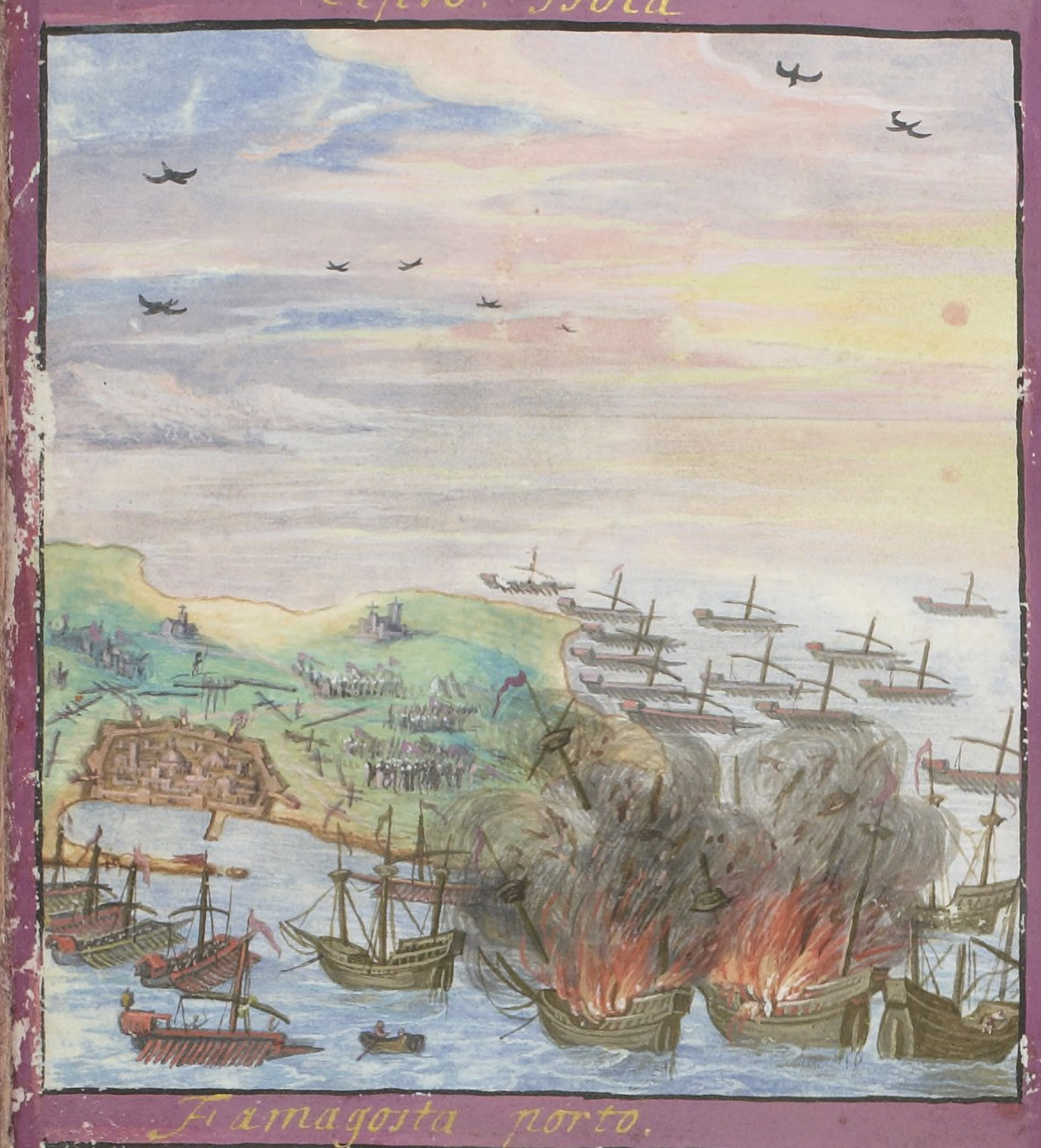
Burning ships in Famagusta Bay

Slavery in Cyprus refer to the history of slavery in Cyprus. During The Roman era, slavery in Cyprus was a part of the history of slavery in the Roman Empire. For most of the middle ages, Cyprus was under Byzantine rule and slavery was thus managed in accordance with the laws of the Byzantine Empire, where slavery largely died out from the 10th century.

During the Venetian era and the Ottoman conquest, Cyprus was termed as infidel territory and subjected to slave raid by the Ottoman Empire. During the Ottoman Empire between 1571 and 1878, slavery was revived and expanded on Cyprus since Cyprus was subjected to the law of the Ottoman Empire, in which chattel slavery was termed legitimate by religious law (halal). During the Ottoman era Cyprus was situated between the Trans-Saharan slave trade and Red Sea slave trade from Africa and the Eastern and central parts of the Ottoman Empire, and Cyprus became a destination as well as a transit area for the African slave trade. In 1878 Cyprus became a British colony. Subject to British law, slavery no longer had legal standing on Cyprus and was thus in effect abolished. The Afro-cyprios are descendants of the former slaves.

== History ==
During the tenure of Roman rule in Ancient Cyprus, slavery was regulated in accordance with the laws of slavery in the Roman Empire.

=== Middle ages ===
Cyprus was under the rule of the Byzantine Empire. During this time period, the institution of slavery in Cyprus was regulated by the laws governing the institution of slavery in the Byzantine Empire.

While slavery in the Byzantine Empire was never formally abolished, it was gradually phased out in favor of serfdom by the landowners in the countryside, which eventually reduced slavery to become a marginal urban phenomena after the 10th century onward.

While slavery was not formally banned, it dwindled to an insignificant phenomena on Cyprus. During the Kingdom of Cyprus (1192-1489), slaves are known to have worked on the royal sugar plantations, but it was noted that this was unusual, since the majority of workers on the sugar plantations on Cyprus, particularly on the non-royal plantations, are known to have been free vage laborers and not slaves, and that this was the normal custom in the Cypriotic sugar industry.

=== Venetian rule ===
The Ottomans frequently raided Cyprus during Venetian rule. The first year of Venetian control, in 1489, the Ottomans attacked the Karpass Peninsula, pillaging and taking captives to be sold into slavery. In the summer of 1570, the Ottomans launched a full-scale invasion of Venetian Cyprus. Troops under the command of Lala Mustafa Pasha landed near Limassol on July 2, 1570, and laid siege to Nicosia. The city fell on September 9, 1570; after which 20,000 Nicosians were massacred, every church, public building, and palace was looted, men were massacred while women and children were captured to be sold as slaves.

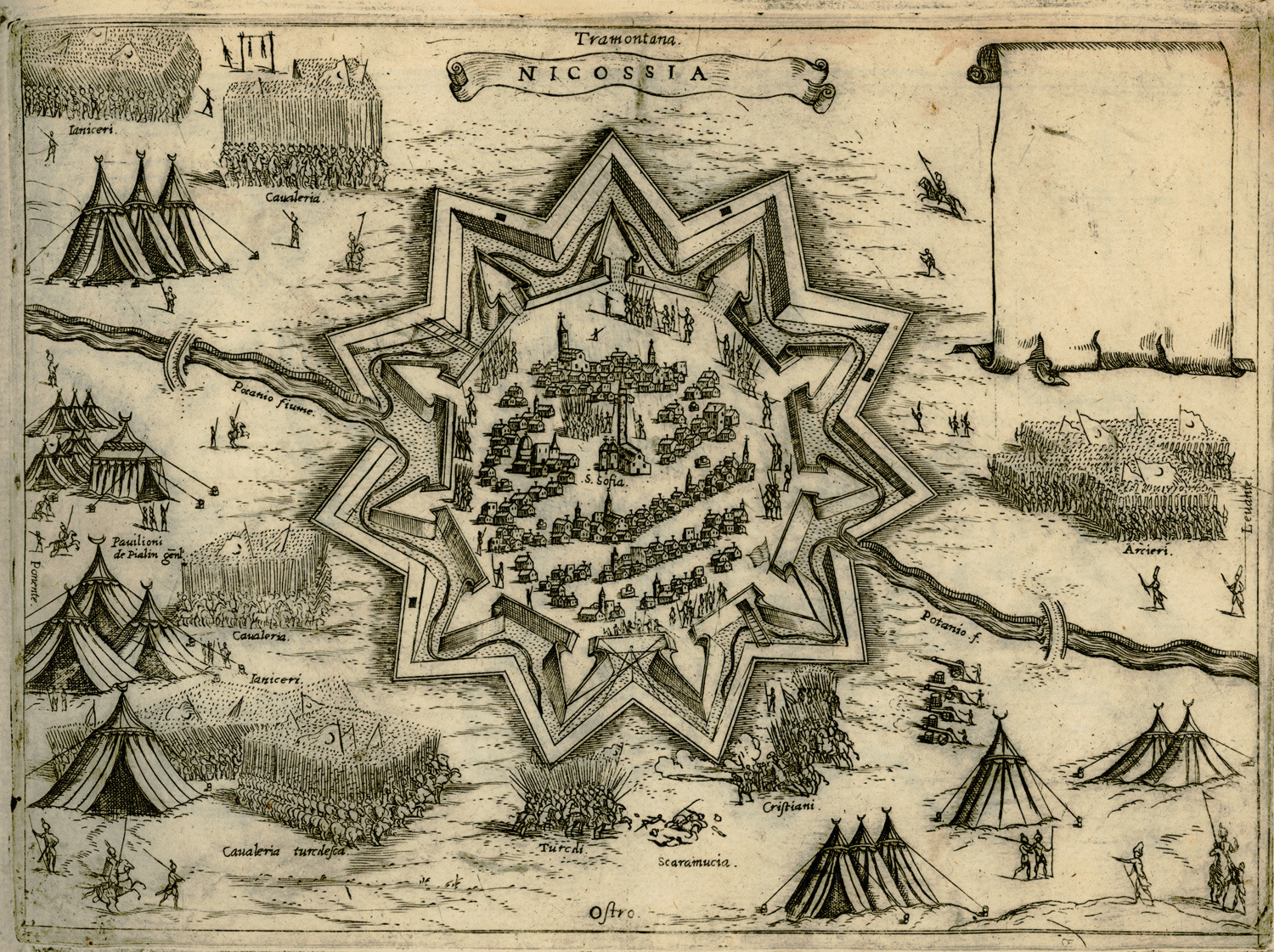
Map of the siege of Nicosia, by Giovanni Camoccio, 1574

The siege of Nicosia during the Ottoman–Venetian War (1570–1573) began on 22 July and lasted for seven weeks, until 9 September. Finally, after 45 days of siege, on 9 September, the 15th assault succeeded in breaching the walls after the defenders had exhausted their ammunition. A massacre of the city's 20,000 inhabitants ensued. Even the city's pigs, regarded as unclean by Muslims, were killed, and only women and boys who were captured to be sold as slaves were spared. A combined Christian fleet of 200 vessels, composed of Venetian (under Girolamo Zane), Papal (under Marcantonio Colonna), and Neapolitan/Genoese/Spanish (under Giovanni Andrea Doria) squadrons that had belatedly been assembled at Crete by late August and was sailing towards Cyprus, turned back when it received news of Nicosia's fall.

There is a famous story about enslavement during the Ottoman conquest. Arnaude de Rocas was taken to the central square where she joined about 800 other young Cypriot women who were also bound for enslavement in Turkey. The women were loaded onto a ship at the port of Limassol, Cyprus. The ship was scheduled to sail the next day for Constantinople, modern day Istanbul, Turkey. During the night, however, the entire vessel exploded killing everyone on board including the young women who had all, it is reported, chosen death rather than slavery. Arnaude is credited with causing the explosion by using a lamp to set fire to the ship's powder store as the guards slept.

=== Ottoman Cyprus ===
During the time period when Cyprus was a province of the Ottoman Empire, the practice of slavery in Ottoman Cyprus (1571-1878) was governed by the Islamic law, that regulated the institution of slavery in the Ottoman Empire.

Ottoman Cyprus was subjected to Ottoman law. Slavery in the Ottoman Empire was regulated by the Seriat, the religious Islamic Law, and by the secular Sultan's law Kanun, which was essentially supplementary regulations to facilitate the implementation of the Seriat law. The Islamic law regarding Islamic views on slavery legitimized enslavement by purchase of already enslaved people from middleman slave traders; by children born from two enslaved parents or from a slave mother without an acknowledged father; or by enslaving war captives, specifically kafir of Dar al-Harb, that is non-Muslims from non-Muslim lands, with whom Muslims of Dar al-Islam (the Muslim world) were by definition always in a state of war. A Muslim man was by law entitled to have sexual intercourse with his female slave (concubinage in Islam) without this being defined as extramarital sex (zina); if he chose to acknowledge paternity of a child with her the child would become free, and his mother would become umm walad and manumitted on the death of her enslaver; but if he did not acknowledge paternity both the child and mother would remain slaves, continuing the line of slavery.

Black African slaves were popular in the Ottoman slave trade, during which they were trafficked via the Trans-Saharan slave trade, the Red Sea slave trade and the Indian Ocean slave trade; and it is documented that African slaves were trafficked to Ottoman Cyprus, which were close to these slava trade routes, from the 16th century onward. During the period of 1590-1640, half of all slaves in Ottoman Cyprus were Black Africans. Male African slaves were bought for use as domestic service, agricultural work and construction labor, while female African slaves were bought for use as house slaves. There were reportedly slave owners among all social classes in Ottoman Cyprus, though less so among Christians than among Muslims. In 1845, every wealthy family on Ottoman Cyprus are estimated to have owned at least two slaves.

Ottoman Cyprus did not only import slaves. Geographically placed between Africa and the Northern and Eastern parts of the Ottoman Empire, Ottoman Cyprus also acted as a strategick middle man in the Ottoman slave trade, and exported slaves: for the year of 1842 alone, for example, 500 slaves are noted to have been trafficked from Cyprus.

==== Abolition ====
Chattel slavery remained legal in the Ottoman Empire, and consequently legal in Cyprus, until the end of Ottoman rule on Cyprus in 1878. The British Empire had abolished slavery in the 1830s, and consequently slavery could not legally exist in a territory under direct British colonial control, which also applied to Cyprus. Therefore slavery could no longer be legal on Cyprus after it became a British colony in 1878. The Afro-Cypriots are descendents of the former Ottoman era slaves.
