= Müezzinzade =

Müezzinzade was an Ottoman Turkish epithet meaning "son of a muezzin". It may refer to:

- Müezzinzade Ali Pasha (died 1571), Ottoman grand admiral and provincial governor
- Müezzinzade Hafız Ahmed Pasha (1564–1632), Ottoman grand vizier and provincial governor
