= Andrea Biagio Badoer =

Venetian politician (1515–1575)

Andrea Biagio Badoer (2 February 1515 – September 1575) was a Venetian administrator and diplomat.

Badoer was the son of Pietro Badoer and Caterina Giustinian. In 1544, he married a daughter of Zuanne Corner. He served as the rector of Feltre in 1552 and of Crema in 1553. He was elected a savio di Terraferma. In 1560, he led an extraordinary embassy to King Philip II of Spain. He was named lieutenant of Friuli in 1563. In December 1567, as a member of the Council of Ten, Badoer took part in negotiations with imperial commissioners concerning the border between Venice and the County of Tyrol.

In 1571, he argued against the formation of the Holy League in the Venetian Senate on the grounds that it would strengthen Spain at Venice's expense and harm Venetian commercial interests in the eastern Mediterranean. In 1572, he was sent to Rome to congratulate Pope Gregory XIII on his election. In 1573, he was sent as an envoy extraordinary to Constantinople to sign the treaty ending the war with the Ottoman Empire. During this time, he outranked the resident Venetian bailo. The Ottomans agreed to a truce of thirty years and mutual freedom of trade.

Badoer left Constantinople on 27 February 1574. In 1575, he was sent as an envoy extraordinary to King Henry III of France. He fell ill en route at Vercelli, dictated his will by which he left his goods to his nephews on 11 September and died shortly after.

== Bibliography ==
- Dursteler, E. R. (2001). "The Bailo in Constantinople: Crisis and Career in Venice's Early Modern Diplomatic Corps". Mediterranean Historical Review. 16 (2): 1–30. doi:10.1080/714004583.
- Ghisalberti, Alberto Maria (1963). "Badoer, Andrea Biagio". Dizionario Biografico degli Italiani, Volume 5: Bacca–Baratta (in Italian). Rome: Istituto dell'Enciclopedia Italiana. ISBN 978-8-81200032-6.
- Panciera, Walter (2013). "Building a Boundary: the First Venetian–Ottoman Border in Dalmatia, 1573–1576" (PDF). Radovi Zavoda za hrvatsku povijest. 45 (1): 9–37.
- Tracy, James (2013). "A Castle in Dalmatia: Zemunik in the Veneto–Ottoman peace Negotiations of 1573–1574" (PDF). Journal of Opinions, Ideas, and Essays. Article #7.
