= Ottoman–Venetian War (1570–1573) =

Conflict between the Ottoman Empire and the Holy League

Fourth Ottoman–Venetian War
- Part of the Ottoman–Venetian wars and Spanish–Ottoman wars
- The Battle of Lepanto
Date	27 June 1570 – 7 March 1573
Location	Cyprus, Ionian and Aegean seas
Result	Ottoman victory
Territorial changes	Cyprus captured by Ottomans

Belligerents
Ottoman Empire; Barbary States	Holy League: Republic of Venice; Spain; Kingdom of Sicily; Kingdom of Naples; Papal States; Republic of Genoa; Duchy of Parma; Grand Duchy of Tuscany; Duchy of Urbino; Duchy of Savoy; Knights of Malta; Greek rebels

Commanders and leaders
Selim II; Sokollu Mehmed Pasha; Piali Pasha; Lala Mustafa Pasha; Müezzinzade Ali Pasha †; Occhiali; Sinan Pasha	Marco Antonio Bragadin (executed); Alvise Martinengo; Sebastiano Venier; Don John of Austria; Marcantonio Colonna; Giovanni Andrea Doria; Giacomo Soranzo

Strength
167,000–187,000	73,500

Casualties and losses
70,000–75,000 killed	15,000–20,000 killed

The Fourth Ottoman–Venetian War, also known as the War of Cyprus, was fought between 1570 and 1573. It was waged between the Ottoman Empire (with the Barbary States)and the Republic of Venice, the latter joined by the Holy League, a coalition of Christian states formed by the pope which included Spain (with Naples and Sicily), the Republic of Genoa, the Duchy of Savoy, the Knights Hospitaller, and the Grand Duchy of Tuscany.

The war, the pre-eminent episode of Sultan Selim II's reign, began with the Ottoman invasion of the Venetian-held island of Cyprus. The capital Nicosia and several other towns fell quickly to the considerably superior Ottoman army, leaving only Famagusta in Venetian hands. Christian reinforcements were delayed, and Famagusta eventually fell in August 1571 after an 11-month-long siege. Two months later, at the Battle of Lepanto, the united Christian fleet destroyed the Ottoman fleet. The Ottomans rebuilt their naval forces and forced Venice to negotiate a separate peace, ceding Cyprus to the Ottomans and paying an indemnity of 300,000 ducats.

== Background ==
The large and wealthy island of Cyprus had been under Venetian rule since 1489. Together with Crete, it was one of the major overseas possessions of the republic, with the indigenous Greek population reaching an estimated 160,000 in the mid-16th century. Aside from its location, which allowed the control of the Levantine trade, the island possessed a profitable production of cotton and sugar. To safeguard their most distant colony, the Venetians paid an annual tribute of 8,000 ducats to the Mamluk sultans of Egypt, and after their conquest by the Ottomans in 1517, the agreement was renewed with the Ottoman Porte. Nevertheless, the island's strategic location in the Eastern Mediterranean, between the Ottoman heartland of Anatolia and the newly acquired provinces of the Levant and Egypt, made it a tempting target for future Ottoman expansion. In addition, the protection offered by the local Venetian authorities to corsairs who harassed Ottoman shipping, including Muslim pilgrims to Mecca, rankled the Ottoman leadership.

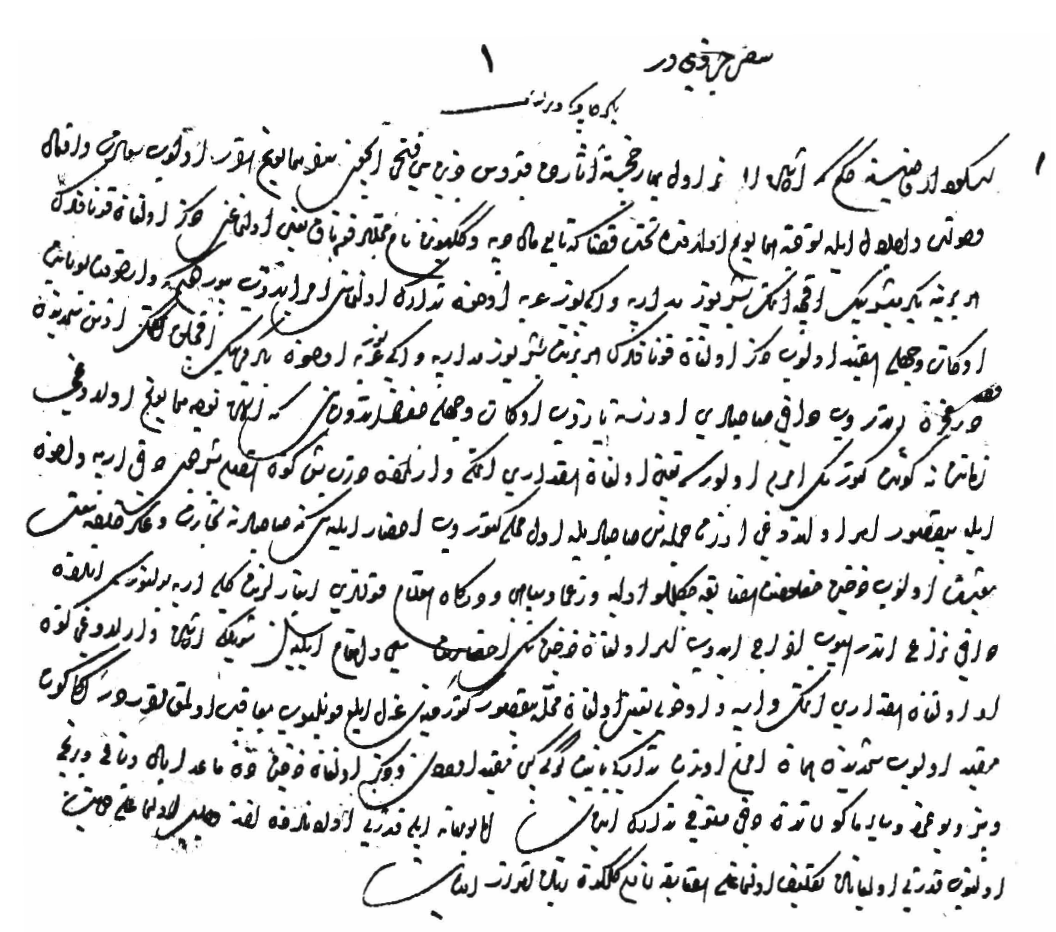
A Divan decision addressed to the qadi of Uskudar about rations before the outbreak of war.

After concluding a prolonged war in Hungary with the Habsburgs in 1568, the Ottomans were free to turn their attention to Cyprus. Sultan Selim II had made the conquest of the island his first priority even before his accession in 1566, relegating Ottoman aid to the Morisco Revolt against Spain and attacks against Portuguese activities in the Indian Ocean to a secondary priority. Not surprisingly for a ruler nicknamed "the Sot", popular legend ascribed this determination to his love of Cypriot wines, but the major political instigator of the conflict, according to contemporary reports, was Joseph Nasi, a Portuguese Jew who had become the Sultan's close friend, and who had already been named to the post of Duke of Naxos upon Selim's accession. Nasi harboured resentment towards Venice and hoped for his own nomination as King of Cyprus after its conquest—he already had a crown and a royal banner made to that effect.

Despite the existing peace treaty with Venice, renewed as recently as 1567, and the opposition of a peace party around Grand Vizier Sokollu Mehmed Pasha, the war party at the Ottoman court prevailed. A favourable juridical opinion by the Sheikh ul-Islam was secured, which declared that the breach of the treaty was justified since Cyprus was a "former land of Islam" (briefly in the 7th century) and had to be retaken. Money for the campaign was raised by the confiscation and resale of monasteries and churches of the Greek Orthodox Church. The Sultan's old tutor, Lala Mustafa Pasha, was appointed as commander of the expedition's land forces. Müezzinzade Ali Pasha was appointed as Kapudan Pasha; being totally inexperienced in naval matters, he assigned the able and experienced Piyale Pasha as his principal aide.

On the Venetian side, Ottoman intentions had been clear and an attack against Cyprus had been anticipated for some time. A war scare had broken out in 1564–1565, when the Ottomans eventually sailed for Malta, and unease mounted again in late 1567 and early 1568, as the scale of the Ottoman naval build-up became apparent. The Venetian authorities were further alarmed when the Ottoman fleet visited Cyprus in September 1568 with Nasi in tow, ostensibly for a goodwill visit, but in reality a poorly concealed attempt to spy on the island's defences. The defences of Cyprus, Crete, Corfu, and other Venetian possessions were upgraded in the 1560s, employing the services of the noted military engineer Sforza Pallavicini. Their garrisons were increased, and attempts were made to make the isolated holdings of Crete and Cyprus more self-sufficient by the construction of foundries and gunpowder mills. However, it was widely recognized that Cyprus could not hold for long unaided. Its exposed and isolated location so far from Venice, surrounded by Ottoman territory, put it "in the wolf's mouth" as one contemporary historian wrote. In the event, lack of supplies and even gunpowder would play a critical role in the fall of the Venetian forts to the Ottomans. Venice could also not rely on help from the major Christian power of the Mediterranean, Habsburg Spain, which was embroiled in the suppression of the Dutch Revolt and domestically against the Moriscos. Another problem for Venice was the attitude of the island's population. The harsh treatment and oppressive taxation of the local Orthodox Greek population by the Catholic Venetians had caused great resentment, so that their sympathies generally lay with the Ottomans.

By early 1570, the Ottoman preparations and the warnings sent by the Venetian bailo at Constantinople, Marco Antonio Barbaro, had convinced the Signoria that war was imminent. Reinforcements and money were sent post-haste to Crete and Cyprus. In March 1570, an Ottoman envoy was sent to Venice, bearing an ultimatum that demanded the immediate cession of Cyprus. Although some voices were raised in the Venetian Signoria advocating the cession of the island in exchange for land in Dalmatia and further trading privileges, the hope of assistance from the other Christian states stiffened the republic's resolve, and the ultimatum was categorically rejected.

== Ottoman conquest of Cyprus ==
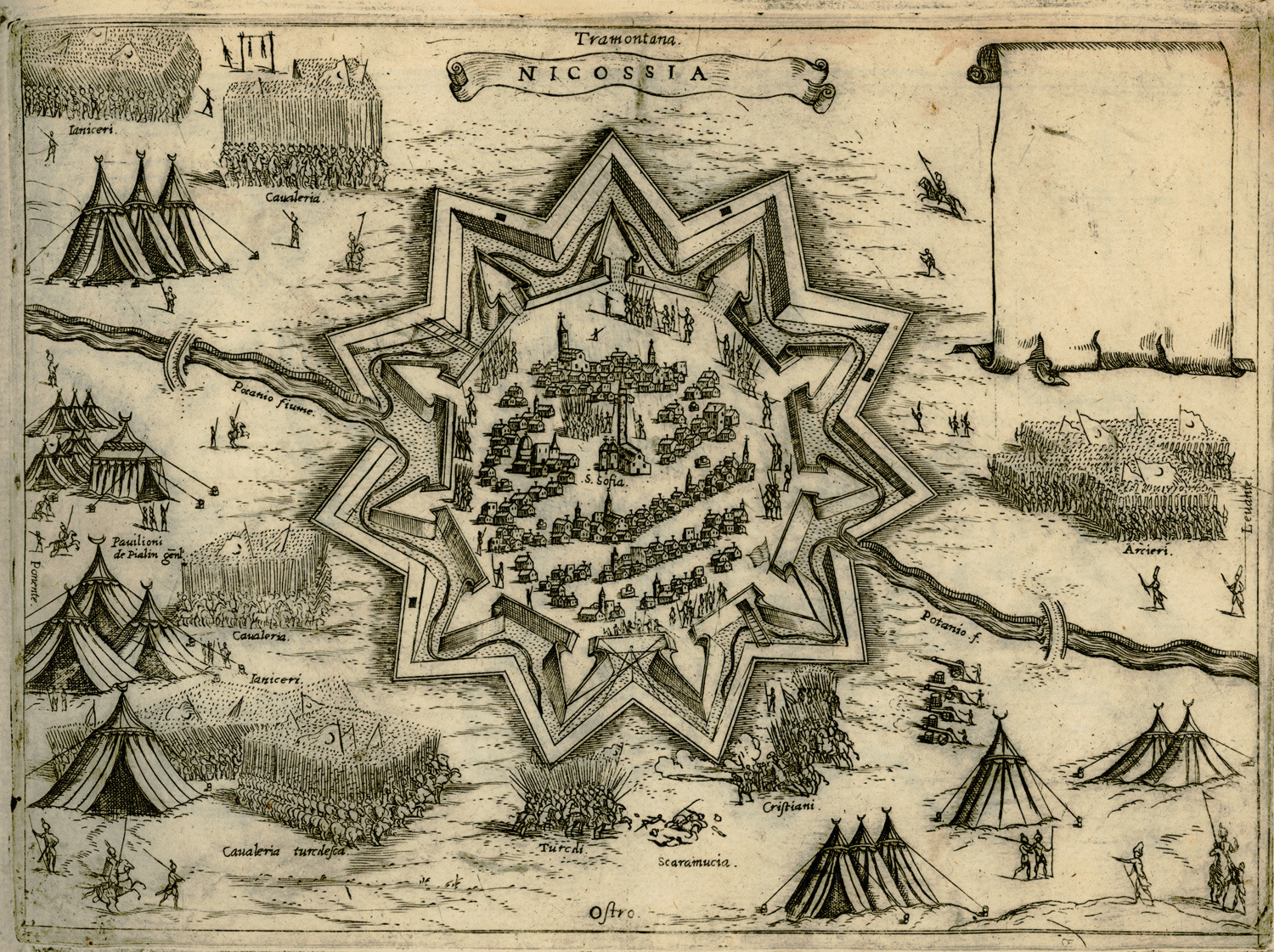
Map of the siege of Nicosia, by Giovanni Camoccio, 1574

On 27 June, the invasion force, some 350–400 ships and 100,000 men, set sail for Cyprus. It landed unopposed at Salines, near Larnaca on the island's southern shore on 3 July, and marched towards the capital, Nicosia. The Venetians had debated opposing the landing, but in the face of the superior Ottoman artillery, and the fact that a defeat would mean the annihilation of the island's defensive force, it was decided to withdraw to the forts and hold out until reinforcements arrived.

The siege of Nicosia began on 22 July and lasted for seven weeks, until 9 September. The city's newly constructed trace italienne walls of packed earth withstood the Ottoman bombardment well. The Ottomans, under Lala Mustafa Pasha, dug trenches towards the walls, and gradually filled the surrounding ditch, while constant volleys of arquebus fire covered the sappers' work. Finally, after 45 days of siege, on 9 September, the 15th assault succeeded in breaching the walls after the defenders had exhausted their ammunition. A massacre of the city's 20,000 inhabitants ensued. Even the city's pigs, regarded as unclean by Muslims, were killed, and only women and boys who were captured to be sold as slaves were spared. A combined Christian fleet of 200 vessels, composed of Venetian (under Girolamo Zane), Papal (under Marcantonio Colonna), and Neapolitan/Genoese/Spanish (under Giovanni Andrea Doria) squadrons that had belatedly been assembled at Crete by late August and was sailing towards Cyprus, turned back when it received news of Nicosia's fall.

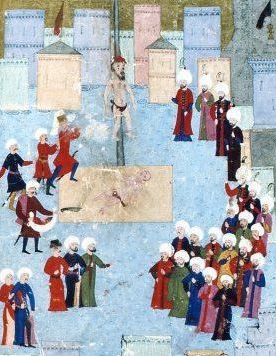
Marco Antonio Bragadin, Venetian commander of Famagusta, was gruesomely killed after the Ottomans took the city.

Following the fall of Nicosia, the fortress of Kyrenia in the north surrendered without resistance, and on 15 September, the Turkish cavalry appeared before the last Venetian stronghold, Famagusta. At this point already, overall Venetian losses (including the local population) were estimated by contemporaries at 56,000 killed or taken prisoner. The Venetian defenders of Famagusta numbered about 8,500 men with 90 artillery pieces and were commanded by Marco Antonio Bragadin. They would hold out for 11 months against a force that would come to number 200,000 men, with 145 guns, providing the time needed by the Pope to cobble together an anti-Ottoman league from the reluctant Christian European states. The Turks set up their guns on 1 September. Over the following months, they proceeded to dig a huge network of criss-crossing trenches for a depth of three miles around the fortress, which provided shelter for the Ottoman troops. As the siege trenches neared the fortress and came within artillery range of the walls, ten forts of timber and packed earth and bales of cotton were erected. The Ottomans however lacked the naval strength to completely blockade the city from sea as well, and the Venetians were able to resupply it and bring in reinforcements. After news of such a resupply in January reached the Sultan, he recalled Piyale Pasha and left Lala Mustafa alone in charge of the siege. At the same time, an initiative by Sokollu Mehmed Pasha to achieve a separate peace with Venice foundered. The Grand Vizier offered to concede a trading station at Famagusta if the Republic would cede the island, but the Venetians, encouraged by their recent capture of Durazzo in Albania and the ongoing negotiations for the formation of a Christian league (see below), refused. Thus on 12 May 1571, the intensive bombardment of Famagusta's fortifications began, and on 1 August, with ammunition and supplies exhausted, the garrison surrendered the city. The siege of Famagusta cost the Ottomans some 50,000 casualties.

The Ottomans allowed the Christian residents and surviving Venetian soldiers to leave Famagusta peacefully, but when Lala Mustafa Pasha learned that some Muslim prisoners had been killed during the siege, he had Bragadin mutilated and flayed alive, while his companions were executed. Bragadin's skin was then paraded around the island, before being sent to Constantinople.

== Holy League ==
As the Ottoman army campaigned in Cyprus, Venice tried to find allies. The Holy Roman Emperor, having just concluded peace with the Ottomans, was not keen to break it. France was traditionally on friendly terms with the Ottomans and hostile to the Spanish, and the Poles were troubled by Muscovy. The Spanish Habsburgs, the greatest Christian power in the Mediterranean, were not initially interested in helping the Republic and resentful of Venice's refusal to send aid during the siege of Malta in 1565. In addition, Philip II of Spain wanted to focus his strength against the Barbary states of North Africa. The Spanish reluctance to engage on the side of the Republic, together with Doria's reluctance to endanger his fleet, had already disastrously delayed the joint naval effort in 1570. However, with the energetic mediation of Pope Pius V, an alliance against the Ottomans, the "Holy League", was concluded on 15 May 1571, which stipulated the assembly of a fleet of 200 galleys, 100 supply vessels, and a force of 50,000 men. To secure Spanish assent, the treaty also included a Venetian promise to aid Spain in North Africa.

According to the terms of the new alliance, during the late summer, the Christian fleet assembled at Messina, under the command of Don John of Austria, who arrived on 23 August. By that time, however, Famagusta had fallen, and any effort to save Cyprus was meaningless. Before setting sail for the east, Don John had to deal with the mutual distrust and hostility among the various contingents, especially between the Venetians and the Genoese. The Spanish admiral tackled the problem by breaking the various contingents up and mingle ships from various states. Doria assumed command of the right wing, Don Juan kept the centre, the Venetian Agostino Barbarigo received the left, and the Spaniard Alvaro de Bazan the reserve. Unaware of Famagusta's fate, the allied fleet left Messina on 16 September, and ten days later arrived at Corfu, where it learned of the Ottoman victory. The Ottoman fleet, commanded by Müezzinzade Ali Pasha, had anchored at Lepanto (Nafpaktos), near the entrance of the Corinthian Gulf.

== Battle of Lepanto ==
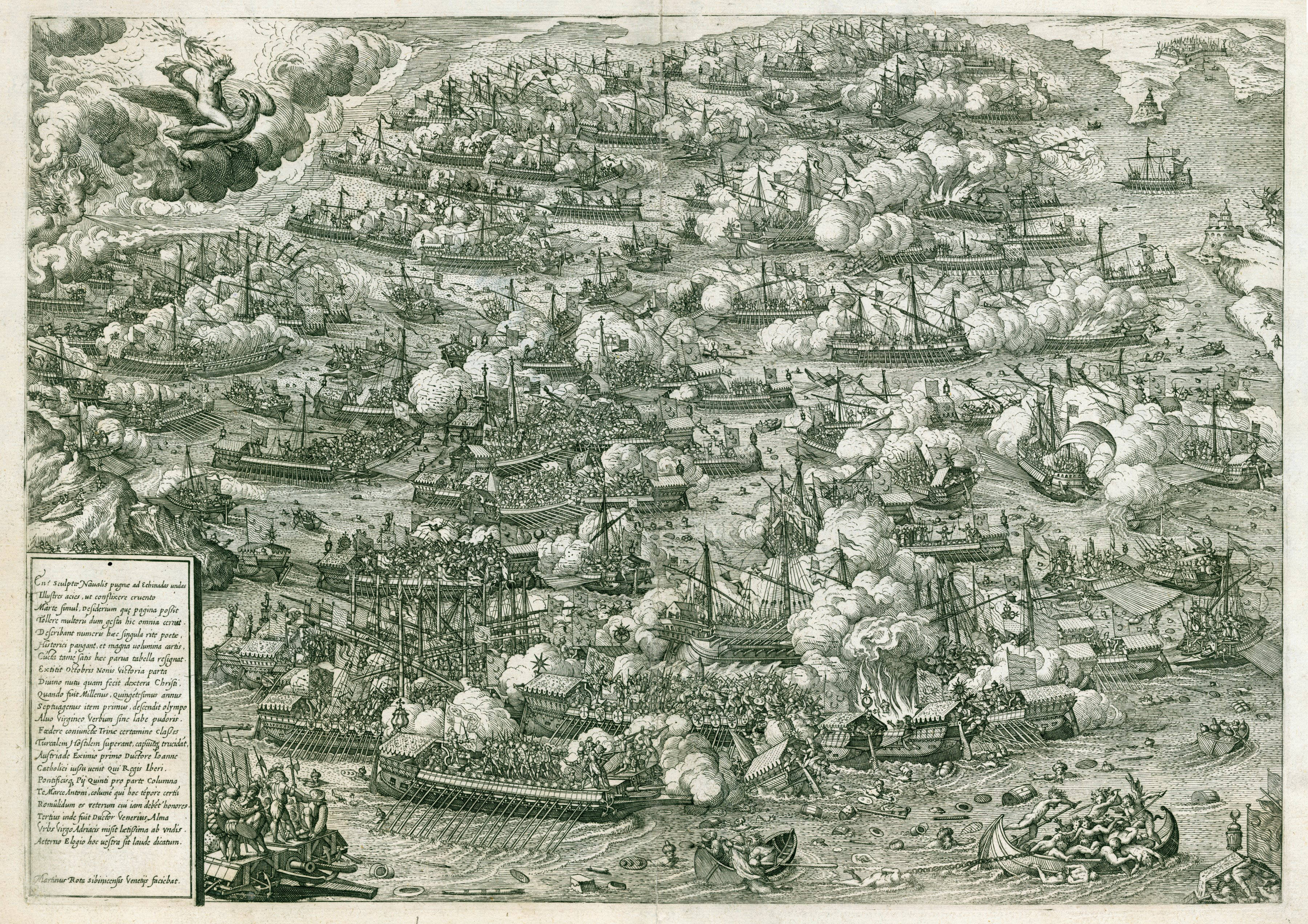
The Battle of Lepanto 1571, engraved by Martin Rota.

Battle of Lepanto from Famous Sea Fights by John R Hale

Both sides sought the decisive engagement, for which they had amassed, according to some estimates, between 70 and 90 percent of all galleys in existence in the Mediterranean at the time. The fleets were roughly balanced: the Ottoman fleet was larger with 278 ships to the 212 Christian ones, but the Christian ships were sturdier; both fleets carried some 30,000 soldiers whereas the Ottoman fleet had 50,000 sailors and oarsmen and the Christian fleet had 20,000 sailors and oarsmen, and while the Christians had twice as many cannons, the Ottomans compensated with a large and skilled corps of archers. On 7 October, the two fleets engaged in the Battle of Lepanto, which resulted in a crushing victory for the Christian fleet, while the Ottoman fleet was effectively destroyed, losing some 25,000–35,000 men in addition to some 12,000 Christian galley slaves who were freed. In popular perception, the battle itself became known as one of the decisive turning points in the long Ottoman-Christian struggle, as it ended the Ottoman naval hegemony established after the Battle of Preveza in 1538. Its immediate results however were minimal: the harsh winter that followed precluded any offensive actions on behalf of the Holy League, while the Ottomans used the respite to hurriedly rebuild their naval strength. At the same time, Venice suffered losses in Dalmatia, where the Ottomans attacked Venetian possessions: the island of Hvar was raided by the Ottoman fleet, with the Turkish forces burning down the towns of Hvar, Stari Grad and Vrboska.

The strategic situation after Lepanto was graphically summed up later by the Ottoman Grand Vizier to the Venetian bailo: "The Christians have singed my beard [meaning the fleet], but I have lopped off an arm. My beard will grow back. The arm [meaning Cyprus], will not". Despite the Grand Vizier's bold statement, however, the damage suffered by the Ottoman fleet was crippling—not so much in the number of ships lost, but in the almost total loss of the fleet's experienced officers, sailors, technicians and marines. Well aware of how hard it would be to replace such men, in the next year the Venetians and the Spanish executed those experts they had taken captive. In addition, despite the limited strategic impact of the allied victory, an Ottoman victory at Lepanto would have had far more important repercussions: it would have meant the effective disappearance of the Christian naval cadres and allowed the Ottoman fleet to roam the Mediterranean at will, with dire consequences for Malta, Crete and possibly even the Balearics or Venice itself. In the event Lepanto, along with the Ottoman failure at Malta six years earlier, confirmed the de facto division of the Mediterranean, with the eastern half under firm Ottoman control and the western under the Habsburgs and their Italian allies.

== After Lepanto ==
The following year, as the allied Christian fleet resumed operations, it faced a renewed Ottoman navy of 200 vessels under Kılıç Ali Pasha. The Spanish contingent under Don John did not reach the Ionian Sea until September, meaning that the Ottomans enjoyed numerical superiority for a time, but the Ottoman commander was well aware of the inferiority of his fleet, constructed in haste of green wood and manned by inexperienced crews. He therefore actively avoided to engage the allied fleet in the skirmish at Cerigo Channel in August, and eventually headed for the safety of the fortress of Modon. The arrival of the Spanish squadron of 55 ships evened the numbers on both sides and opened the opportunity for a decisive blow to Modon with the siege of Navarino, but friction among the Christian leaders and the reluctance of Don John squandered the opportunity.

The diverging interests of the League members began to show, and the alliance began to unravel. In 1573, the Holy League fleet failed to sail altogether; instead, Don John attacked and took Tunis, only for it to be retaken by the Ottomans in 1574. Venice, fearing the loss of her Dalmatian possessions and a possible invasion of Friuli, and eager to cut her losses and resume the trade with the Ottoman Empire, initiated unilateral negotiations with the Porte.

== Peace settlement and aftermath ==
Andrea Biagio Badoer, an extraordinary ambassador, conducted the negotiations for Venice. In view of the Republic's inability to regain Cyprus, the resulting treaty, signed on 7 March 1573, confirmed the new state of affairs: Cyprus became an Ottoman province, and Venice paid an indemnity of 300,000 ducats. In addition, the border between the two powers in Dalmatia was modified by the Turkish occupation of small but important parts of the hinterland that included the most fertile agricultural areas near the cities, with adverse effects on the economy of the Venetian cities in Dalmatia.

Peace would continue between the two states until 1645, when a long war over Crete would break out. Cyprus itself remained under Ottoman rule until 1878, when it was ceded to Britain as a protectorate. Ottoman sovereignty continued until the outbreak of World War I, when the island was annexed by Britain, becoming a crown colony in 1925.

== Portrayal in film ==
The war is referenced in the 1998 movie Dangerous Beauty, released as A Destiny of Her Own in some countries—about the life of Veronica Franco, portrayed by Catherine McCormack. The film was based on the 1992 book The Honest Courtesan, by US author Margaret F. Rosenthal.

== Sources ==
- Abulafia, David (2012). The Great Sea: A Human History of the Mediterranean. Penguin Books. ISBN 978-0-141-02755-5.
- Borowiec, Andrew (2000). Cyprus: A Troubled Island. Greenwood Publishing Group. ISBN 978-0-275-96533-4.
- Faroqhi, Suraiya (2004). The Ottoman Empire and the World Around It. I. B. Tauris. ISBN 978-1-85043-715-4.
- Finkel, Caroline (200). Osman's Dream: The Story of the Ottoman Empire 1300–1923. London: John Murray6. ISBN 978-0-7195-6112-2.
- Goffman, Daniel (2002). The Ottoman Empire and Early Modern Europe. Cambridge University Press. ISBN 978-0-521-45908-2.
- Greene, Molly (200). A Shared World: Christians and Muslims in the Early Modern Mediterranean. Princeton University Press0. ISBN 978-0-691-00898-1.
- Guilmartin, John F. (2003). Galleons and Galleys: Gunpowder and the Changing Face of Warfare at Sea, 1300–1650. Cassell. ISBN 0-304-35263-2.
- Hopkins, T. C. F. (2007). Confrontation at Lepanto: Christendom Vs. Islam. Macmillan. ISBN 978-0-7653-0539-8.
- Lane, Frederic Chapin (1973). Venice, a Maritime Republic. JHU Press. ISBN 978-0-8018-1460-0.
- Madden, Thomas F. (2012). Venice: A New History. New York: Viking. ISBN 978-1-101-60113-6.
- McEvedy, Colin; Jones, Richard (1978). Atlas of World Population History. Penguin. ISBN 978-0140510768.
- Parry, V. J. (1976). "The Successors of Sulaimān, 1566–1617, 1566–1617". In Cook, M. A. (ed.). A History of the Ottoman Empire to 1730: Chapters from the Cambridge History of Islam and the New Cambridge Modern History. Cambridge University Press Archive. ISBN 978-0-521-20891-8.
- Rodgers, William Ledyard (1967). Naval Warfare Under Oars, 4th to 16th Centuries: A Study of Strategy, Tactics and Ship Design. Naval Institute Press. ISBN 978-0-87021-487-5.
- Setton, Kenneth M. (1984). The Papacy and the Levant (1204–1571), Volume III: The Sixteenth Century to the Reign of Julius III. Vol. 3. Philadelphia: The American Philosophical Society. ISBN 0-87169-161-2.
- Setton, Kenneth M. (1984a). The Papacy and the Levant (1204–1571), Volume IV: The Sixteenth Century from Julius III to Pius V. Vol. 4. Philadelphia: The American Philosophical Society. ISBN 0-87169-162-0.
- Turnbull, Stephen (2003). The Ottoman Empire 1326–1699. Essential Histories Series #62. Osprey Publishing. ISBN 978-0-415-96913-0.
