= Müezzinzade Ali Pasha =

Ottoman governor and admiral

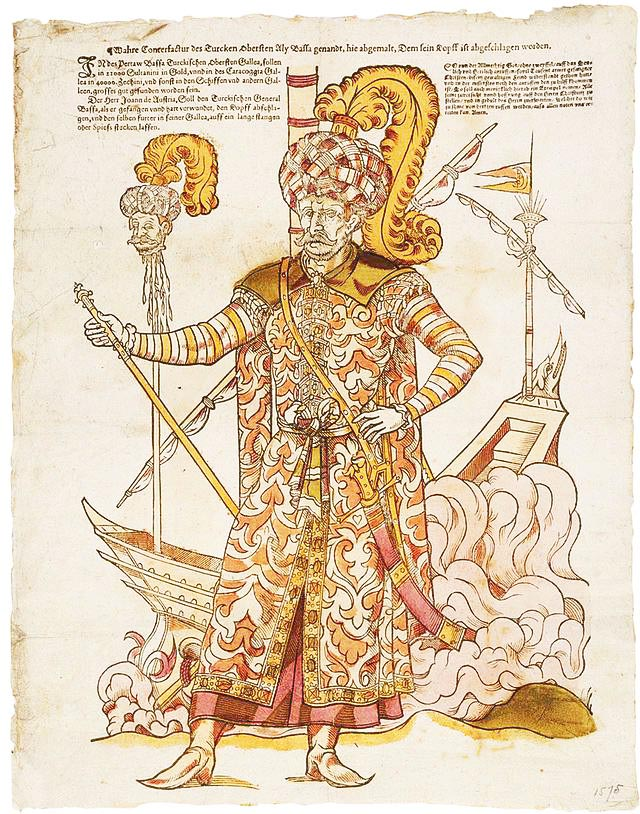
- Müezzinzade in a 1571 broadsheet
- Died: 7 October 1571 Gulf of Patras, Ionian Sea
- Allegiance: Ottoman Empire
- Branch: Ottoman Navy
- Service years: c. 1530–1571
- Rank: Kapudan Pasha
- Conflicts: Ottoman–Habsburg wars: Battle of Lepanto †; Ottoman–Venetian War (1570–1573): Siege of Ulcinj (1571)
- Other work: Governor of Ottoman Egypt

Müezzinzade Ali Pasha (Turkish: Müezzinzade Ali Paşa; also known as Sofu Ali Pasha or Sufi Ali Pasha or Meyzinoğlu Ali Pasha; died 7 October 1571) was an Ottoman statesman and naval officer. He was the Grand Admiral (Kapudan Pasha) in command of the Ottoman fleet at the Battle of Lepanto, where he was killed in action. He also served as the governor of Egypt from 1563 to 1566.

== Background ==
His date of birth and exact place of birth are unknown. However, it is known that his father worked in Edirne, and that he grew up in the provinces. He was an ethnic Turk, and would later marry an Ottoman Turk princess. His father was a muezzin, hence his epithet Müezzinzade ("son of a muezzin"). He was trained in Enderûn. He was a favorite of Sultan Selim II and of the women of the seraglio who admired his voice as a muezzin. He married one of Selim II's daughters.

He would rise in Ottoman society as a member of the Janissaries.

From 1563 to 1566, Ali Pasha served as the Ottoman governor of Egypt. He was reportedly a very ascetic Sufi man, wearing only "coarse woolen clothes" and paying many visits to the tombs of saints in the City of the Dead necropolis in Cairo.

== Ottoman conquest of Cyprus ==
Ali Pasha, with a fleet eventually numbering 188 galleys, fustas, transports and other ships, carried the main land force, commanded by Lala Mustafa Pasha, for the Ottoman invasion and conquest of Cyprus from Constantinople on 16 May 1570 to Cyprus, where they landed on 3 July. While Lala Mustafa commanded the eventual capture of the island from Venice, Ali Pasha took the bulk of his fleet to Crete and then to Morea, thereby effectively preventing any Christian relief fleet from coming to the aid of the besieged defenders of Cyprus.

Ali Pasha ordered the Massacre in Nicosia and the brutal torture of the captain of the Kingdom of Cyprus Marco Antonio Bragadin. He had Bragadin mutilated and flayed alive, while his companions were executed. Bragadin's skin was then paraded around the island, before being sent to Constantinople.

== Battle of Lepanto and death ==
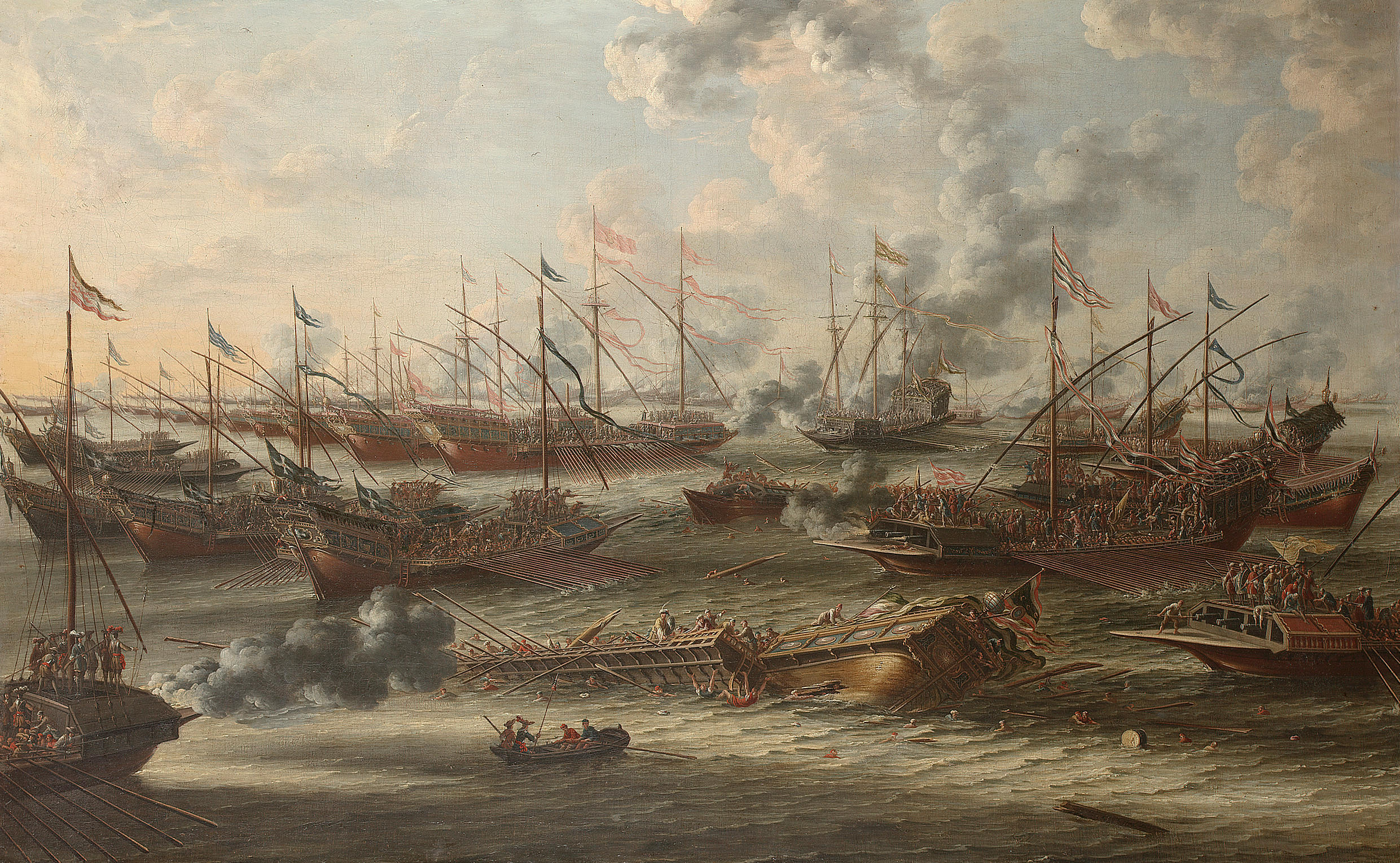
1683 painting of the Battle of Lepanto by Laureys a Castro

Ali Pasha was Grand Admiral, or Kapudan Pasha, of the Ottoman naval forces at the Battle of Lepanto on 7 October 1571. Selim had entrusted him with one of the most precious possessions of the Ottoman Sultans, the great "Banner of the Caliphs", a huge green banner heavily embroidered with texts from the Qur'an and with the name of Allah emblazoned upon it 28,900 times in golden letters. It was intended to provide an incentive for him and his men to do their best in battle.

Ali Pasha initiated the battle, however his reasoning for doing so has been disputed. Some believe that he may have been encouraged by the Holy League's smaller numbers and underestimated the Christians, while others believe he may have feared displeasing the Sultan who had previously commanded him to engage the enemy. Others however point to his lack of naval experience as what caused the defeat at Lepanto. His flagship, the galley Sultana, battled head-to-head with Don Juan's flagship La Real, was boarded and, after about one hour of bloody fighting, with reinforcements being provided to both sides by other galleys in their respective fleets, was captured. In the ensuing battle, Ali Pasha was slain and his head was then displayed upon a pike. This, and the capture of the Banner of the Caliphs by La Real, led to a collapse in Turkish morale, greatly contributing to their rout in the battle.

Author Oliver Warren in the book Great Sea Battles describes the capture and death of Ali Pasha;

"The climax came when Don John gave the order to board; once, twice, parties were driven back, but at last they carried the Turkish poop [aft deck]. There Ali Pasha, already wounded in the head by a ball from an arquebus [long gun], tried to buy his life with a promise of treasure. It was in vain. Even his protective talisman, the right canine of Mahomet contained in a crystal ball, did not avail him. A soldier cut him down, hacked off his head, and carried it to Don John. The admiral, recoiling in horror, ordered the man to throw the grisly trophy into the sea; but he disobeyed. The Spaniard mounted it on a pike, which was then held aloft on the prow of the Turkish flagship. Consternation spread among the Moslems, and, within a few moments, resistance was over. The Ottoman standard, a sacred emblem inscribed with the name of Allah twenty-nine thousand times and never before lost in battle, was lowered from the maintop." (Pg. 21 & 23)

His subordinate Occhiali, who had led a successful flank at Lepanto, would replace him as Kapudan Pasha.

== See also ==
- List of Ottoman governors of Egypt
- List of Kapudan Pashas

== Literature ==
- Currey, E. Hamilton, Sea-Wolves of the Mediterranean, John Murrey, 1910
- Bicheno, Hugh, Crescent and Cross: The Battle of Lepanto 1571, Phoenix, London, 2003 ISBN 1-84212-753-5
- T.C.F. Hopkins, Confrontation at Lepanto, Tom Doherty, New York, 2006 ISBN 0-7653-0538-0

Political offices
Preceded by Kara Şahin Mustafa Pasha	Ottoman Governor of Egypt; 1563–1566	Succeeded by Mahmud Pasha
Military offices
Preceded by Piyale Pasha	Kapudan Pasha; 1569–1571	Succeeded by Uluç Ali Reis
