= Yemen Eyalet =

Ottoman province in Arabia (1517–1636, 1849–1872)

Yemen Eyalet إيالة اليمن (Arabic) ایالت یمن (Ottoman Turkish)
- Eyalet of the Ottoman Empire
- 1517–1636; 1849–1872
- Flag

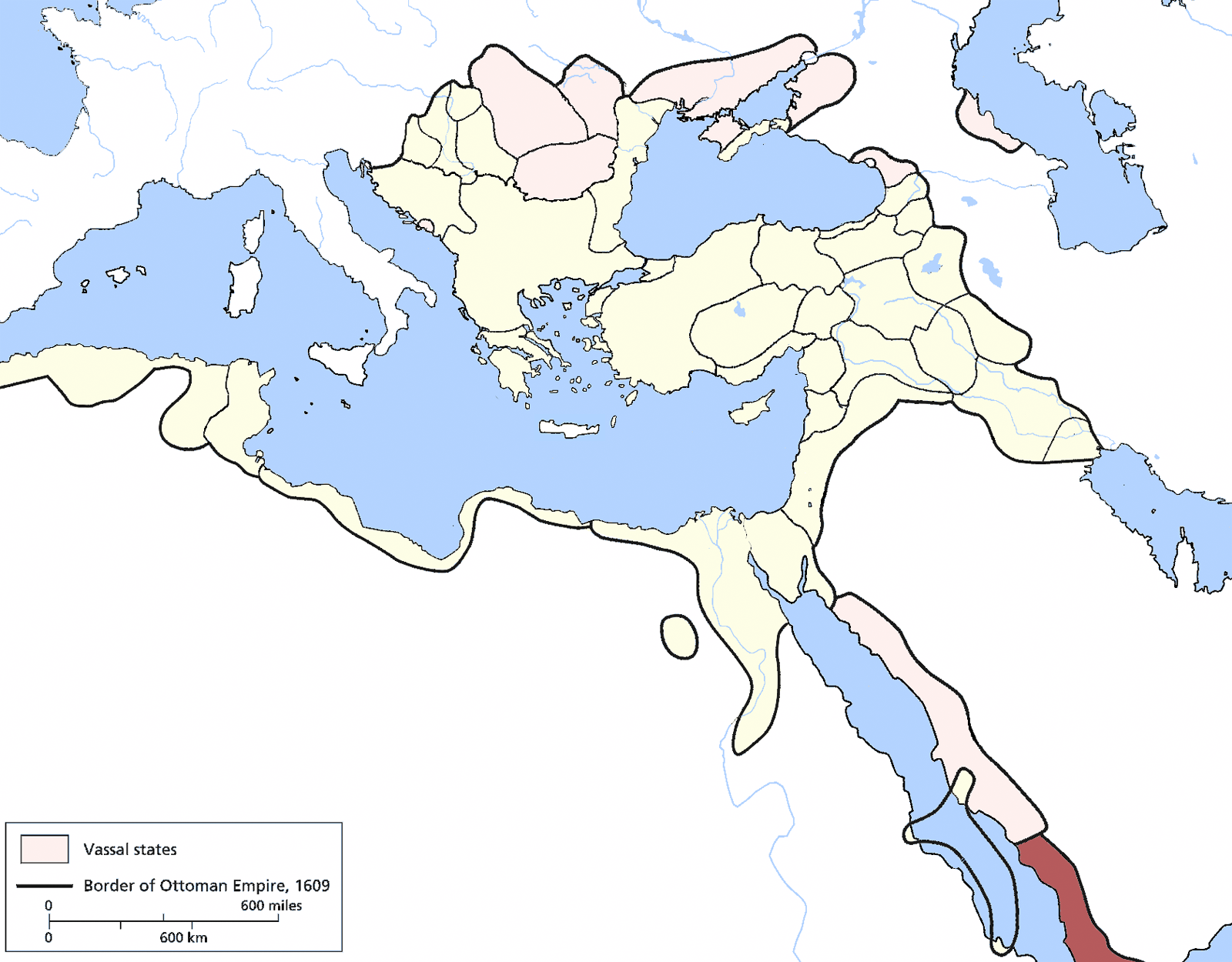
- The Yemen Eyalet in 1609
- Capital: Mokha
- Demonym: Yemeni
- History
  - Established: 1517
  - Disestablished: 1872
Preceded by
Mamluk Sultanate
Qasimid State
Portuguese Aden
Succeeded by
Qasimid State
Yemen vilayet
- Today part of: Saudi Arabia; Yemen

The Yemen Eyalet (Arabic: إيالة اليمن; Ottoman Turkish: ایالت یمن, romanized: Eyālet-i Yemen) was an eyalet (province) of the Ottoman Empire. Although formally an integral part of the empire, the far-flung province was notoriously difficult to administer, and was often lawless. During the early 17th century, the Eyalet was entirely lost to the Zaidi-ruled Qasimid State, only to be recovered by the Ottomans two centuries later. The Yemen Eyalet was reorganized in 1849, upon Ottoman takeover of much of Greater Yemen territories. In 1872, most of it became Yemen Vilayet after a land reform in the empire.

== Ottoman rule ==
In 1516, the Mamluks of Egypt annexed Yemen; but in the following year, the Mamluk governor surrendered to the Ottomans, and Turkish armies subsequently overran the country. They were challenged by the Zaidi Imam, Qasim the Great (r. 1597–1620), and by 1636, the Zaydi tribesmen had driven the Ottomans out of the country completely.

The Ottomans had two fundamental interests to safeguard in Yemen: The Islamic holy cities of Mecca and Medina, and the trade route with India in spices and textiles—both threatened, and the latter virtually eclipsed, by the arrival of the Portuguese in the Indian Ocean and the Red Sea in the early 16th century. Hadım Suleiman Pasha, the Ottoman governor of Egypt, was ordered to command a fleet of 90 ships to conquer Yemen. The country was in a state of incessant anarchy and discord as Pasha described it by saying:

Yemen is a land with no lord, an empty province. It would be not only possible but easy to capture, and should it be captured, it would be master of the lands of India and send every year a great amount of gold and jewels to Constantinople.

Imam al-Mutawakkil Yahya Sharaf ad-Din ruled over the northern highlands including Sana'a, while Aden was held by the last Tahiride Sultan 'Amir ibn Dauod. Pasha stormed Aden in 1538, killing its ruler, and extended Ottoman authority to include Zabid in 1539 and eventually Tihama in its entirety. Zabid became the administrative headquarters of Yemen Eyalet. The Ottoman governors did not exercise much control over the highlands. They held sway mainly in the southern coastal region, particularly around Zabid, Mocha, and Aden. Of 80,000 soldiers sent to Yemen from Egypt between 1539 and 1547, only 7,000 survived. The Ottoman accountant-general in Egypt remarked:

We have seen no foundry like Yemen for our soldiers. Each time we have sent an expeditionary force there, it has melted away like salt dissolved in water.

The Ottomans sent yet another expeditionary force to Zabid in 1547, while Imam al-Mutawakkil Yahya Sharaf ad-Din was ruling the highlands independently. Imam al-Mutawakkil Yahya chose his son Ali to succeed him, a decision that infuriated his other son al-Mutahhar ibn Yahya. Al-Mutahhar was lame, so he was not qualified for the imamate. He urged Oais Pasha, the Ottoman colonial governor in Zabid, to attack his father. Indeed, Ottoman troops supported by tribal forces loyal to Imam al-Mutahhar stormed Taiz and marched north toward Sana'a in August 1547. The Turks officially made Imam al-Mutahhar a Sanjak-bey with authority over 'Amran. Imam al-Mutahhar assassinated the Ottoman colonial governor and recaptured Sana'a, but the Ottomans, led by Özdemir Pasha, forced al-Mutahhar to retreat to his fortress in Thula. Özdemir Pasha effectively put Yemen under Ottoman rule between 1552 and 1560. He was considered a competent ruler given Yemen's notorious lawlessness, garrisoning the main cities, building new fortresses, and rendering secure the main routes. Özdemir died in Sana'a in 1561 and was succeeded by Mahmud Pasha.

Unlike Özdemir's brief but able leadership, Mahmud Pasha was described by other Ottoman officials as a corrupt and unscrupulous governor. He used his authority to take over several castles, some of which belonged to the former Rasulid kings. Mahmud Pasha killed a Sunni scholar from Ibb. The Ottoman historian claimed that this incident was celebrated by the Zaydi Shia community in the northern highlands. Disregarding the delicate balance of power in Yemen by acting tactlessly, he alienated different groups within Yemeni society, causing them to forget their rivalries and unite against the Turks. Mahmud Pasha was displaced by Ridvan Pasha in 1564. By 1565, Yemen was split into two provinces, the highlands under the command of Ridvan Pasha and Tihama under Murad Pasha. Imam al-Mutahhar launched a propaganda campaign in which he claimed that the Islamic prophet Muhammad came to him in a dream and advised him to wage jihad against the Ottomans. Al-Mutahhar led the tribes to capture Sana'a from Ridvan Pasha in 1567. When Murad tried to relieve Sana'a, highland tribesmen ambushed his unit and slaughtered all of them. Over 80 battles were fought. The last decisive encounter took place in Dhamar around 1568, in which Murad Pasha was beheaded and his head sent to al-Mutahhar in Sana'a. By 1568, only Zabid remained under the possession of the Turks.

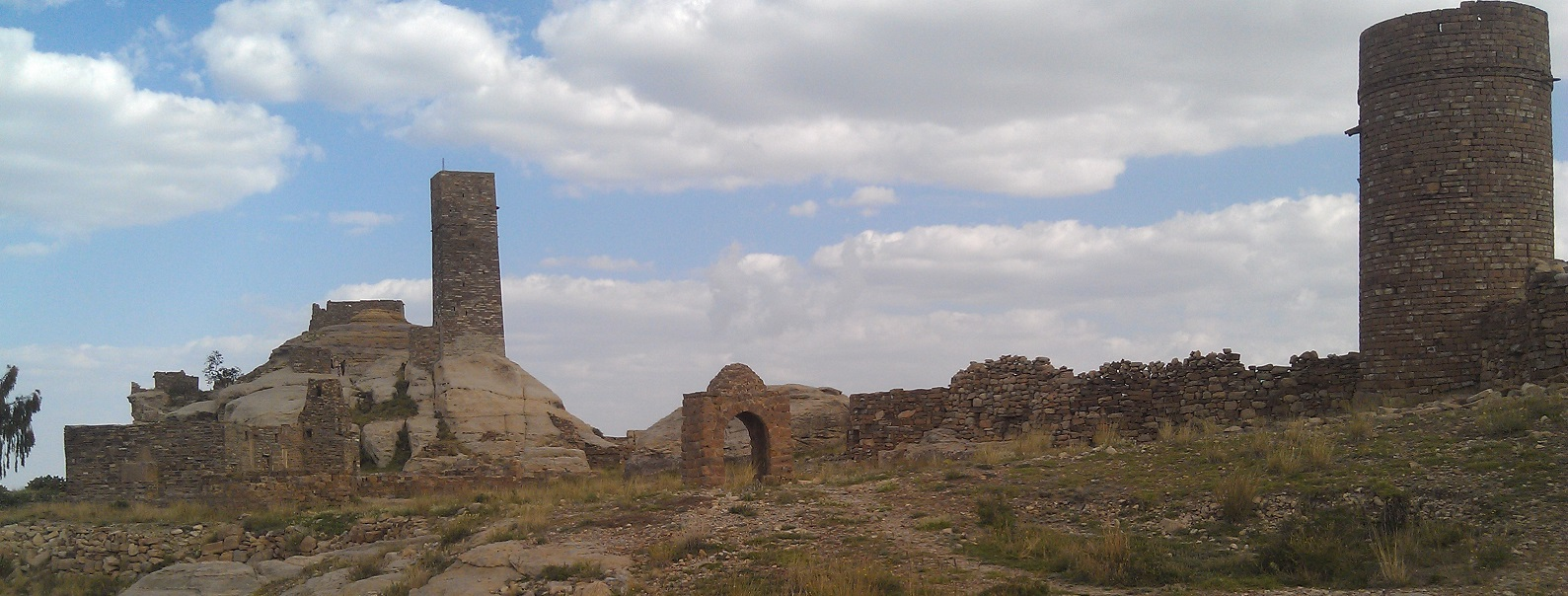
Ruins of Thula fortress in 'Amran, where al-Mutahhar ibn Yahya barricaded himself against Ottoman attacks

Lala Kara Mustafa Pasha, the Ottoman governor of Syria, was ordered by Selim II to suppress the Yemeni rebels. However, the Turkish army in Egypt was reluctant to go to Yemen due to their knowledge of the hegemony of the northern Yemenis. Mustafa Pasha sent a letter with two Turkish shawishes hoping to persuade al-Mutahhar to give an apology and confirm that Mustafa Pasha did not promote any act of aggression against the Ottoman army, and state that the "ignorant Arabian" according to the Turks, acted on their own. Imam al-Mutahhar refused the Ottoman offer. When Mustafa Pasha sent an expeditionary force under the command of Uthman Pasha, it was defeated with great casualties. Sultan Selim II was infuriated by Mustafa's hesitation to go to Yemen. He executed a number of sanjak-beys in Egypt and ordered Sinan Pasha to lead the entire Turkish army in Egypt to reconquer Yemen. Sinan Pasha was a prominent Ottoman general of Albanian origin. He reconquered Aden, Taiz, and Ibb, and besieged Shibam Kawkaban in 1570 for seven months. The siege was lifted once a truce was reached. Imam al-Mutahhar was pushed back, but could not be entirely overcome. After al-Mutahhar's demise in 1572, the Zaydi community was not united under an imam; the Turks took advantage of their disunity and conquered Sana'a, Sa'dah, and Najran in 1583. Imam al-Nasir Hassan was arrested in 1585 and exiled to Constantinople, thereby putting an end to the Yemeni rebellion.

The Zaydi tribesmen in the northern highlands particularly those of Hashid and Bakil, were ever the Turkish bugbear in all Arabia. The Ottomans who justified their presence in Yemen as a triumph for Islam, accused the Zaydis of being infidels. Hassan Pasha was appointed governor of Yemen and enjoyed a period of relative peace from 1585 to 1597. Pupils of al-Mansur al-Qasim suggested he should claim the imamate and fight the Turks. He declined at first, but the promotion of the Hanafi school of jurisprudence at the expense of Zaydi Islam infuriated al-Mansur al-Qasim. He proclaimed the imamate in September 1597, which was the same year the Ottoman authorities inaugurated al-Bakiriyya Mosque. By 1608, Imam al-Mansur (the victorious) regained control over the highlands and signed a truce for 10 years with the Ottomans. Imam al-Mansur al-Qasim died in 1620. His son Al-Mu'ayyad Muhammad succeeded him and confirmed the truce with the Ottomans. In 1627, the Ottomans lost Aden and Lahej. 'Abdin Pasha was ordered to suppress the rebels, but failed, and had to retreat to Mocha. Al-Mu'ayyad Muhammad expelled the Ottomans from Sana'a in 1628, only Zabid and Mocha remained under Ottoman possession. Al-Mu'ayyad Muhammad captured Zabid in 1634 and allowed the Ottomans to leave Mocha peacefully. The reason behind Al-Mu'ayyad Muhammad's success was the possession of firearms by the tribes and their unity behind him.

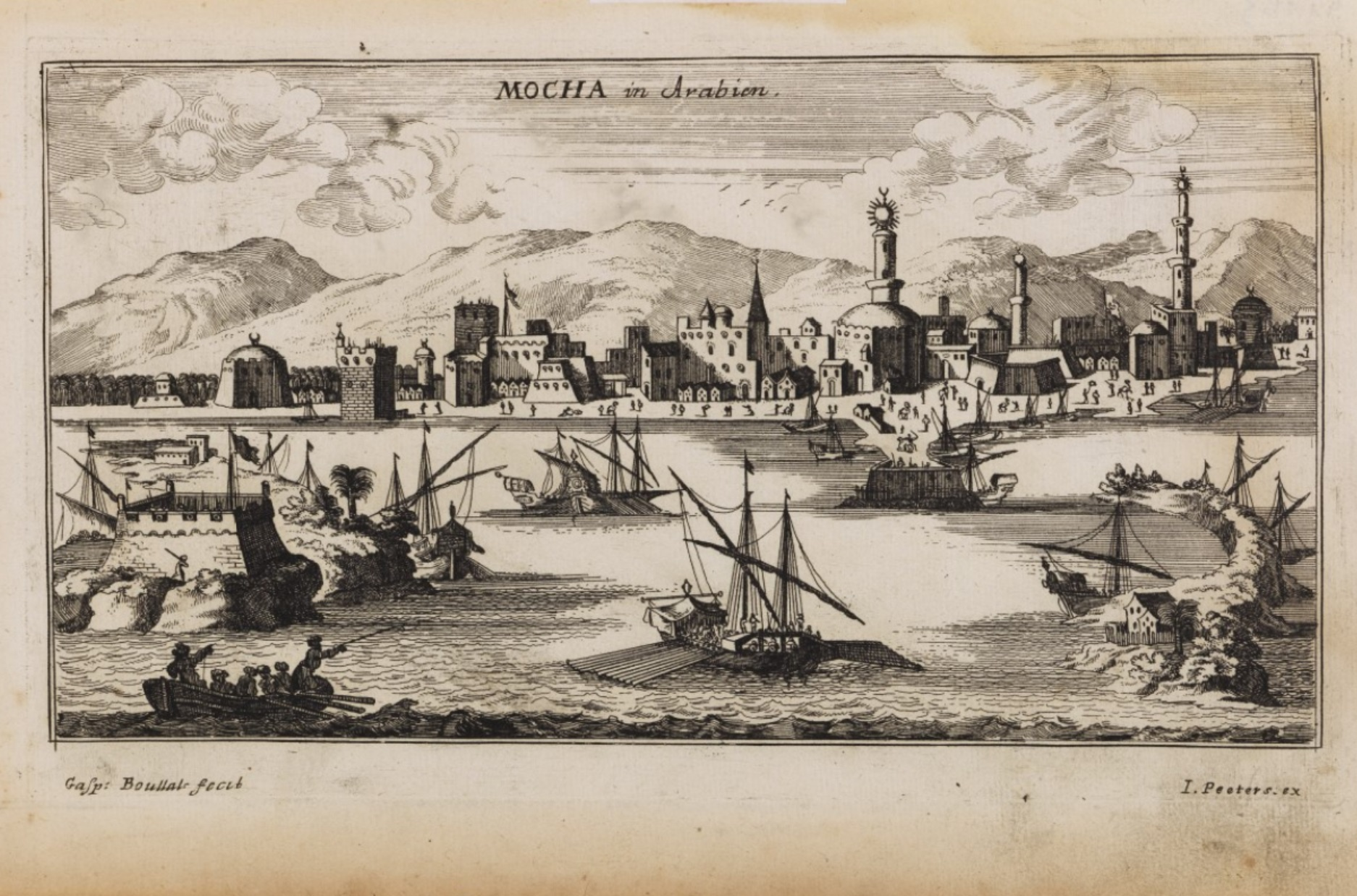
Mocha was Yemen's busiest port in the 17th and 18th centuries

In 1632, Al-Mu'ayyad Muhammad sent an expeditionary force of 1,000 men to conquer Mecca. The army entered the city in triumph and killed its governor. The Ottomans were not ready to lose Mecca after Yemen, so they sent an army from Egypt to fight the Yemenites. Seeing that the Turkish army was too numerous to overcome, the Yemeni army retreated to a valley outside Mecca. Ottoman troops attacked the Yemenis by hiding at the wells that supplied them with water. This plan proceeded successfully, causing the Yemenis over 200 casualties, most from thirst. The tribesmen eventually surrendered and returned to Yemen. Al-Mu'ayyad Muhammad died in 1644. He was succeeded by Al-Mutawakkil Isma'il, another son of al-Mansur al-Qasim, who conquered Yemen in its entirety, from Asir in the north to Dhofar in the east. During his reign, and during the reign of his successor, Al-Mahdi Ahmad (1676–1681), the imamate implemented some of the harshest discriminatory laws (ghiyar) against the Jews of Yemen, which culminated in the expulsion of all Jews (Exile of Mawza) to a hot and arid region in the Tihama coastal plain. The Qasimid state was the strongest Zaydi state to ever exist. See Yemeni Zaidi State for more information.

During that period, Yemen was the sole coffee producer in the world. The country established diplomatic relations with the Safavid dynasty of Persia, Ottomans of Hejaz, Mughal Empire in India, and Ethiopia, as well. Fasilides of Ethiopia sent three diplomatic missions to Yemen, but the relations did not develop into a political alliance, as Fasilides had hoped, due to the rise of powerful feudalists in his country. In the first half of the 18th century, the Europeans broke Yemen's monopoly on coffee by smuggling coffee trees and cultivating them in their own colonies in the East Indies, East Africa, the West Indies, and Latin America. The imamate did not follow a cohesive mechanism for succession, and family quarrels and tribal insubordination led to the political decline of the Qasimi dynasty in the 18th century. In 1728 or 1731, the chief representative of Lahej declared himself an independent sultan in defiance of the Qasimid dynasty and conquered Aden, thus establishing the Sultanate of Lahej. The rising power of the fervently Islamist Wahhabi movement on the Arabian Peninsula cost the Zaidi state its coastal possessions after 1803. The imam was able to regain them temporarily in 1818, but new intervention by the Ottoman viceroy of Egypt in 1833 again wrested the coast from the ruler in Sana'a. After 1835, the imamate changed hands with great frequency and some imams were assassinated. After 1849, the Zaidi polity descended into chaos that lasted for decades.

== Great Britain and the nine regions ==
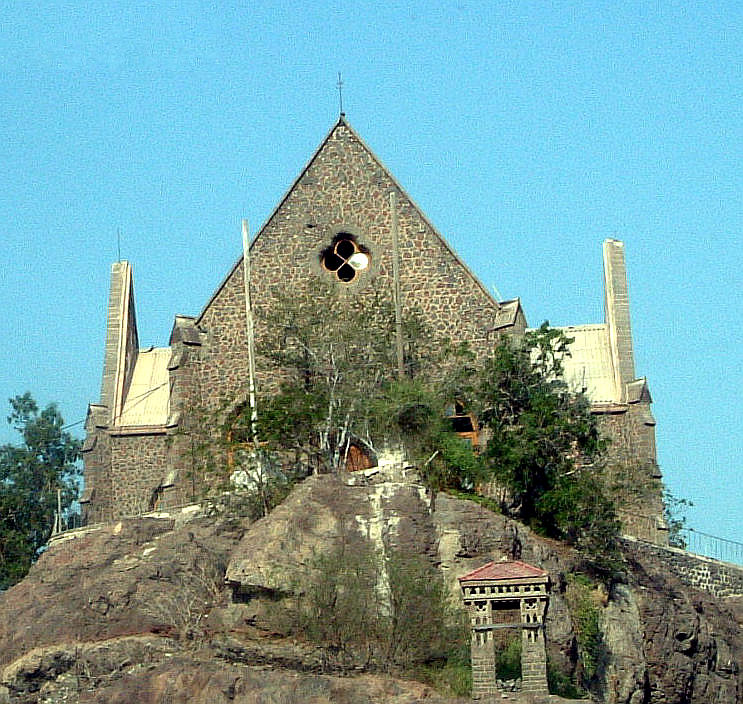
The building of the Legislative Council of Aden, built by the English in the 19th century as St. Mary's Church, was converted into the building of the Legislative Council in the 1960s, and is now a museum

The British were looking for a coal depot to service their steamers en route to India. It took 700 tons of coal for a round-trip from Suez to Bombay. East India Company officials decided on Aden. The British Empire tried to reach an agreement with the Zaydi imam of Sana'a, permitting them a foothold in Mocha, and when unable to secure their position, they extracted a similar agreement from the Sultan of Lahej, enabling them to consolidate a position in Aden. An incident played into British hands when, while passing Aden for trading purposes, one of their sailing ships sank and Arab tribesmen boarded it and plundered its contents. The British India government dispatched a warship under the command of Captain Stafford Bettesworth Haines to demand compensation.

Haines bombarded Aden from his warship in January 1839. The ruler of Lahej, who was in Aden at the time, ordered his guards to defend the port, but they failed in the face of overwhelming military and naval power. The British managed to occupy Aden and agreed to compensate the sultan with an annual payment of 6,000 riyals. The British evicted the Sultan of Lahej from Aden and forced him to accept their "protection". In November 1839, 5,000 tribesmen tried to retake the town but were repulsed and 200 were killed. The British realised that Aden's prosperity depended on their relations with the neighbouring tribes, which required that they rest on a firm and satisfactory basis.

The British government concluded "protection and friendship" treaties with nine tribes surrounding Aden, whereas they would remain independent from British interference in their affairs as long as they did not conclude treaties with foreigners (non-Arab colonial powers). Aden was declared a free zone in 1850. With emigrants from India, East Africa, and Southeast Asia, Aden grew into a world city. In 1850, only 980 Arabs were registered as original inhabitants of the city. The English presence in Aden put them at odds with the Ottomans. The Turks asserted to the British that they held sovereignty over the whole of Arabia, including Yemen as the successor of Mohammed and the Chief of the Universal Caliphate.

== Ottoman return ==
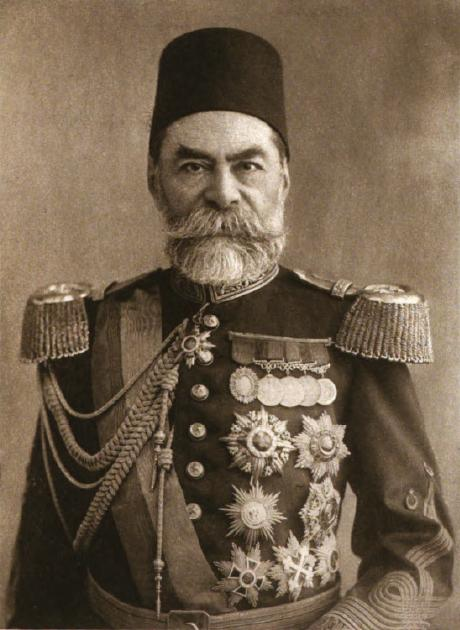
The Ottoman Grand Vizier and Wāli of Yemen Ahmed Muhtar Pasha

The Ottomans were concerned about the British expansion from the British ruled subcontinent to the Red Sea and Arabia. They returned to the Tihama in 1849 after an absence of two centuries. Rivalries and disturbances continued among the Zaydi imams, between them and their deputies, with the ulema, with the heads of tribes, as well as with those who belonged to other sects. Some citizens of Sana'a were desperate to return law and order to Yemen and asked the Ottoman Pasha in Tihama to pacify the country. Yemeni merchants knew that the return of the Ottomans would improve their trade, for the Ottomans would become their customers. An Ottoman expedition force tried to capture Sana'a, but was defeated and had to evacuate the highlands. The Opening of the Suez Canal in 1869, strengthened the Ottoman decision to remain in Yemen. In 1872, military forces were dispatched from Constantinople and moved beyond the Ottoman stronghold in the lowlands (Tihama) to conquer Sana'a. By 1873, the Ottomans succeeded in conquering the northern highlands. Sana'a became the administrative capital of Yemen Vilayet.

The Ottomans learned from their previous experience and worked on the disempowerment of local lords in the highland regions. They even attempted to secularize the Yemeni society, while Yemenite Jews came to perceive themselves in Yemeni nationalist terms. The Ottomans appeased the tribes by forgiving their rebellious chiefs and appointing them to administrative posts. They introduced a series of reforms to enhance the country's economic welfare. However, corruption was widespread in the Ottoman administration in Yemen. This was because only the worst of the officials were appointed because those who could avoid serving in Yemen did so. The Ottomans had reasserted control over the highlands for a temporary duration. The so-called Tanzimat reforms were considered heretic by the Zaydi tribes. In 1876, the Hashid and Bakil tribes rebelled against the Ottomans; the Turks had to appease them with gifts to end the uprising.

The tribal chiefs were difficult to appease and an endless cycle of violence curbed Ottoman efforts to pacify the land. Ahmed Izzet Pasha proposed that the Ottoman army evacuate the highlands and confine itself to Tihama, and not unnecessarily burden itself with continuing military operation against the Zaydi tribes. The hit-and-run tactics of the northern highlands tribesmen wore out the Ottoman military. They resented the Turkish Tanzimat and defied all attempts to impose a central government upon them. The northern tribes united under the leadership of the House of Hamidaddin in 1890. Imam Yahya Hamidaddin led a rebellion against the Turks in 1904; the rebels disrupted the Ottoman ability to govern. The revolts between 1904 and 1911 were especially damaging to the Ottomans, costing them as many as 10,000 soldiers and as much as 500,000 pounds per year. The Ottomans signed a treaty with imam Yahya Hamidaddin in 1911. Under the treaty, Imam Yahya was recognized as an autonomous leader of the Zaydi northern highlands. The Ottomans continued to rule Shafi'i areas in the mid-south until their departure in 1918.

== Governors ==
First Ottoman period

- Mustafa Pasha al-Nashshar (1539/40–1549)
- Özdemir Pasha (1549–1554)
- Mustafa Pasha al-Nashshar (1554–1555/56)
- Kara Shahin Mustafa Pasha (1556–1560)
- Mahmud Pasha (1561–1565)
- Ridwan Pasha (1565–1567)
- Özdemiroğlu Osman Pasha (1569–1573)
- Murad Pasha (1576–1580)
- Hasan Pasha (1580–1604)
- Ja'far Pasha (1607–1616)
- Mehmed Pasha (1616–1621)
- Ahmad Fadli Pasha (1622–1624)
- Haydar Pasha (1624–1629)
- Aydin Pasha (1628–1630)
- Qansuh Pasha (1629–1635)

Second Ottoman period

- Mustafa Sabri Pasha (May 1850–March 1851)
- Mehmed Sirri Pasha (March 1851–October 1851)
- Bonaparta Mustafa Pasha (October 1851–May 1852)
- Kürt Mehmed Pasha (May 1852–May 1856)
- Babanli Ahmed Pasha (1st time) (May 1856–December 1862)
- Musullu Ali Yaver Pasha (December 1862–August 1864)
- Babanli Ahmed Pasha (August 1864–February 1867)
- Tacirli Ahmed Pasha (February 1867–March 1869)
- Halepli Ali Pasha (March 1869–May 1871)
- Topal Bursali Mehmed Redif Pasha (May 1871–August 1871)

Succeeded by the Yemen Vilayet

== Administrative divisions ==
Sanjaks of the Eyalet in the mid-19th century:

1. Sanjak of Mokha
2. Sanjak of Eharish (Abu `Arish?)
3. Sanjak of Massu

== See also ==
- Yemen Vilayet of the Ottoman Empire
- Islamic history of Yemen
