= Mahmud Pasha (governor) =

Ottoman statesman from Bosnia

Mahmud Pasha (died 1567) was an Ottoman statesman from Bosnia who served as the Ottoman governor of Yemen Eyalet from 1561 to 1565 until being deposed, and of Egypt Eyalet from 1566 until his assassination by gunfire in 1567.

He was described as an "unscrupulous," corrupt, but wealthy official with "the riches of the al-Nazaris in his possession." He reportedly disliked his successor for the governorship of Yemen, Ridwan Pasha, and purposefully made his job harder with actions he took just before his removal from office.

As the governor of Egypt, Mahmud Pasha had the Al-Mahmoudia Mosque, which still stands today, built in Cairo.

== See also ==
- List of Ottoman governors of Egypt

Political offices
Preceded by Müezzinzade Ali Pasha	Ottoman Governor of Egypt; 1566–1567	Succeeded by Koca Sinan Pasha
