= Arnaude de Rocas =

Cypriot 16th-century woman

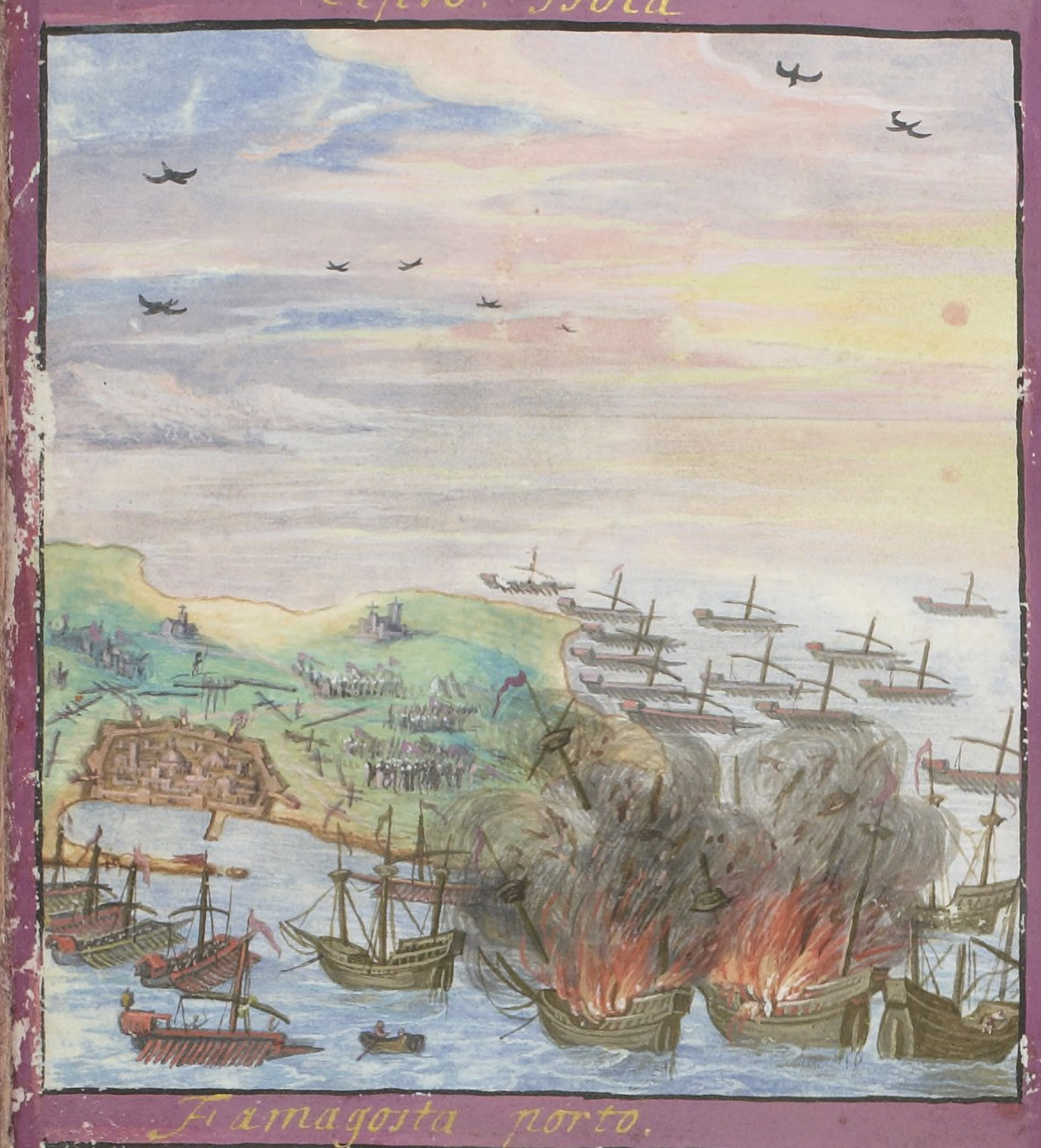
Burning ships in Famagusta Bay

Arnaude de Rocas (Greek: Μαρία Συγκλητική, Maria Syglitiki, a.k.a. Arnalda di Roca; died 1570) is a legendary figure from Cyprus, remembered there as a martyr of the Ottoman–Venetian War (1570–1573).

== Biography ==
According to legend, Maria (Arnalda) was the daughter of Eugene Syglitikos (Zegno Singlitico, count of Roccas/Rochas), who was killed in battle when the Ottoman Turks took Nicosia, capital of Cyprus, on 9 September 1570 after a long siege. Allegedly, she died in an explosion one or two days thereafter. It is said that she managed to set fire to the powder kegs of the ship, while the ship was still in Famagusta Bay.

Arnaude had come to the front lines to help prepare bandages for the wounded fighters who were defending the fort, which was the custom for women at that time. The defending forces repelled two assaults, but not the third, and the fortress fell. Arnaude hid in an underground chapel with her father, where she tended to his mortal wounds. When Turkish soldiers found the daughter and her dying father, Arnaude's captors indicated that she would be destined for slavery in the harem of Sultan Selim II.

She was taken to the central square where she joined about 800 other young Cypriot women also bound for enslavement. The women were loaded onto a ship at the port of Limassol. The ship was scheduled to sail the next day for Constantinople. During the night, however, the entire vessel exploded, killing everyone on board including the young women who had all, it is reported, chosen death rather than slavery. Arnaude is credited with causing the explosion by using a lamp to set fire to the ship's powder store as the guards slept.

== See also ==
- Bernardo de Opuo
- Slavery in Cyprus
