= Dangerous Beauty =

1998 film by Marshall Herskovitz

- Theatrical release poster
- Directed by: Marshall Herskovitz
- Screenplay by: Jeannine Dominy
- Based on: The Honest Courtesan by Margaret Rosenthal
- Produced by: Marshall Herskovitz; Edward Zwick; Arnon Milchan; Sarah Caplan
- Starring: Catherine McCormack; Rufus Sewell; Oliver Platt; Moira Kelly; Fred Ward; Jacqueline Bisset
- Cinematography: Bojan Bazelli
- Edited by: Steven Rosenblum
- Music by: George Fenton
- Production companies: Regency Enterprises; Bedford Falls Productions
- Distributed by: Warner Bros. (United States and Canada); 20th Century Fox (International)
- Release date: February 20, 1998
- Running time: 112 minutes
- Country: United States
- Language: English
- Budget: $8 million (estimated)
- Box office: $4.55 million

Dangerous Beauty is a 1998 American biographical drama film directed by Marshall Herskovitz, and starring Catherine McCormack, Rufus Sewell and Oliver Platt. Based on the non-fiction book The Honest Courtesan by Margaret Rosenthal, the film is about Veronica Franco, a courtesan in sixteenth-century Venice who becomes a hero to her city, but later becomes the target of an inquisition by the Church for witchcraft. The film features a supporting cast that includes Fred Ward, Naomi Watts, Moira Kelly and Jacqueline Bisset. The film was released as A Destiny of Her Own in some regions, and was retitled The Honest Courtesan for its UK release.

Dangerous Beauty was released on February 20, 1998 by Warner Bros. in the United States and Canada, with 20th Century Fox releasing in other territories. The film received mixed to positive reviews but was a box office bomb, grossing $4.55 million against an estimated $8 million budget.

== Plot ==
Veronica Franco is an adventurous, curious, slightly tomboyish young woman in Venice. Her love, Marco, who will be a Senator like his father, cannot marry her because her family is too poor; he marries a foreign noblewoman instead.

Paola, Veronica's mother, plans for her family's financial security, as she still requires dowries for her younger daughters and money for her son's commission. Rather than go to a convent, Paola suggests Veronica become a courtesan, a highly paid, cultured prostitute like her mother and grandmother before her.

At first Veronica is repelled by the idea, but once she discovers that courtesans are allowed access to libraries and education, she tentatively embraces the idea. Training under her mother's tutelage, Veronica is shown how to seduce men subtly, even from afar.

Impressing the powerful men of Venice with her beauty, wit, and compassion, Veronica quickly gains a reputation as a top courtesan. Marco finds it difficult to adjust to his new wife, who is nothing like Veronica, and becomes jealous as Veronica takes his friends and relatives as lovers.

Marco's cousin, Maffio, a poor bard who was once publicly upstaged and later rejected by Veronica, attacks her due to envy. They have a duel of words as well of swords, after which Marco rushes to Veronica's aid. Although Marco and Veronica rekindle their romance, she refuses to stop seeing clients and accept his support. Nevertheless, Veronica spends a great deal of time with Marco, neglecting her business and ignoring her mother's warnings that such a relationship is dangerous for her.

The Fourth Ottoman–Venetian War (1570–73) breaks out, and the city appeals to France for aid. In order to secure a military alliance, Veronica is encouraged to seduce the King of France, which she does.

Accusing Veronica of enjoying being a courtesan, Marco implies she ought to have rejected the King despite the risk to Venice. Veronica points out that she sacrificed their love for the good of the city, while he only did it to protect his family's political standing, so Marco leaves for war angry.

Being better connected and educated than the noblewomen left behind, Veronica is called to inform them of the war's progress. Soon ejected from the gathering, she and her noblewoman friend have a private conference, where she is asked to one day train her daughter to be a courtesan. Veronica points out she is not much freer in the end, having to plan to support herself in her old age.

While the Venetians are fighting at sea, a plague hits the city. Religious zealots take the war and plague as punishment for the city's moral degradation, and Veronica's home is quarantined and almost ransacked by a mob. Marco returns before Veronica is charged and just before Paola dies of the plague.

Veronica is summoned to appear before the Inquisition on charges of witchcraft. Maffio, who is now a monsignor, leads the forces against Veronica, and Marco accuses him of having a personal vendetta against her. Marco declares that if she is guilty, then he—along with many others present―is her accomplice. Even when it appears that she will be executed, Veronica refuses to name her clients. Marco publicly shames the Venetian ministers and senators into admitting their own adulteries and sins by standing up in the assembly. Bewildered by the extent of sin in the city, and unwilling to attack so many powerful men, the Inquisitor drops the charges of witchcraft.

Marco and Veronica were lovers the rest of their days.

== Cast ==
- Catherine McCormack as Veronica Franco
- Rufus Sewell as Marco Venier
- Oliver Platt as Maffio Venier
- Fred Ward as Domenico Venier
- Naomi Watts as Giulia De Lezze
- Moira Kelly as Beatrice Venier
- Jacqueline Bisset as Paola Franco
- Jeroen Krabbé as Pietro Venier
- Joanna Cassidy as Laura Venier
- Melina Kanakaredes as Livia
- Daniel Lapaine as Serafino Franco
- Justine Miceli as Elena Franco
- Jake Weber as King Henry
- Simon Dutton as Minister Ramberti
- Grant Russell as Francesco Martenengo
- Carla Cassola as Caterina
- Ralph Riach as Lorenzo Gritti
- Tim McMullan as Zealot
- Richard O'Callaghan as Zealot

== Reception ==
The film opened in limited release on 20 February 1998 to mixed but mostly positive reviews, receiving a 70% rating on review aggregator website Rotten Tomatoes. Roger Ebert of the Chicago Sun-Times gives it 3 1/2 stars and lauds the writers, noting that "few movies have been so deliberately told from a woman's point of view....Most movies are made by males and show women enthralled by men. This movie knows better." Jack Mathews of the Los Angeles Times described it as "both blessed and cursed with inspiration."

In its initial release, Dangerous Beauty played in only 10 theatres, although it did well, earning $105,989 (a per theater average of $10,599 across ten theaters). Dangerous Beauty eventually opened across 313 theaters, and earned $4.5 million in the United States.

== Stage versions ==
A stage musical version of the film premiered on July 25, 2008, at Northwestern University's Ethel M. Barber Theatre. The musical features book and verse by Jeannine Dominy (the screenwriter of the film), lyrics by Amanda McBroom, and music by Michele Brourman under the direction of Sheryl Kaller. Another musical version of Dangerous Beauty premiered at the Pasadena Playhouse in February 2011, starring Jenny Powers as Veronica Franco and James Snyder as Marco Venier.
