= Al-Mahmoudia Mosque =

Mosque in Cairo, Egypt

- مسجد المحمودية
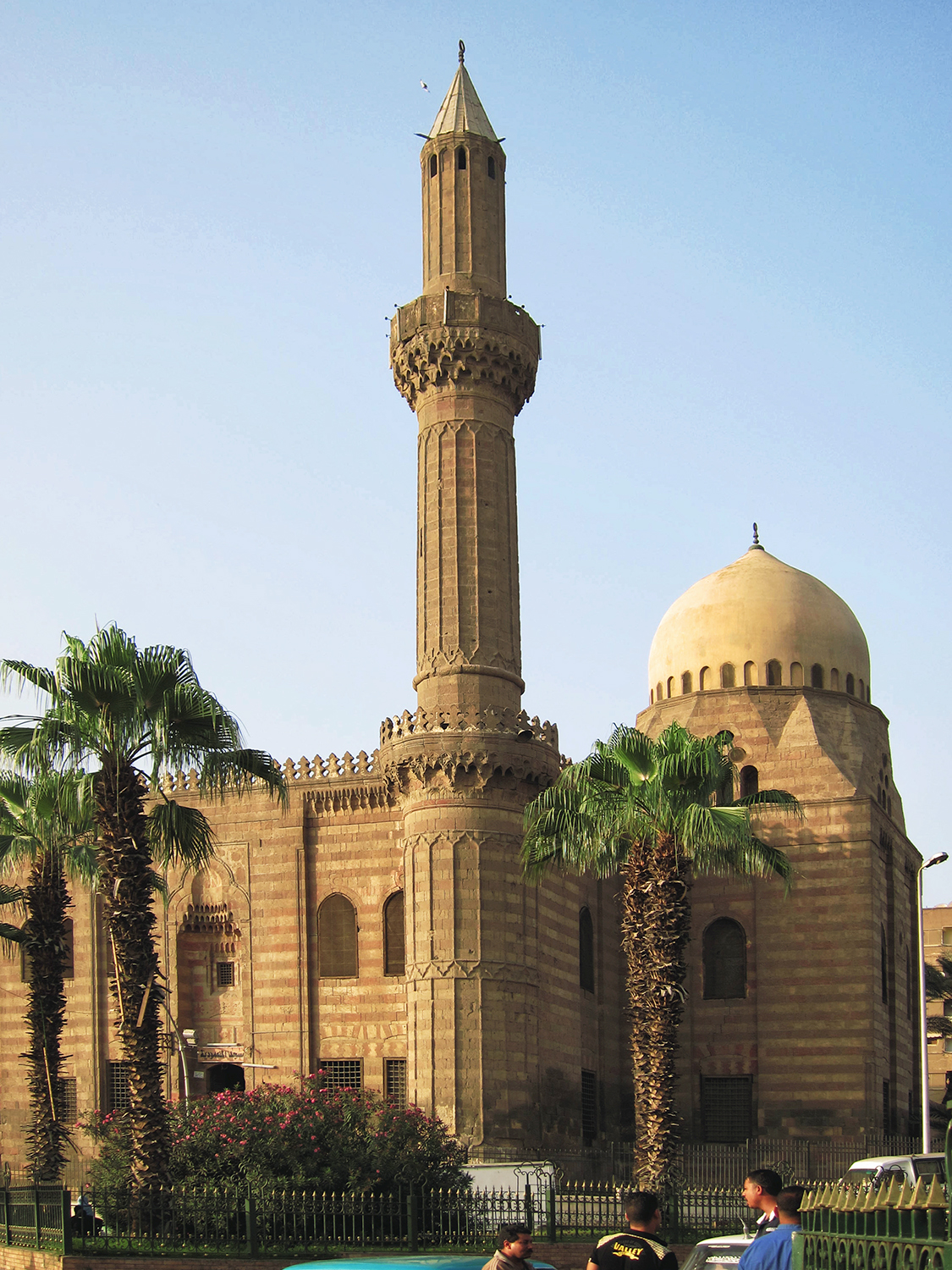

Religion
- Affiliation: Sunni Islam
- Ecclesiastical or organisational status: Mosque and mausoleum
- Status: Active

Location
- Location: Salah al-Din Square, Citadel, Islamic Cairo
- Country: Egypt
- Interactive map of Al-Mahmoudia Mosque
- Coordinates: 30°01′54″N 31°15′28″E

Architecture
- Type: Mosque
- Style: Mamluk (main); Ottoman (minaret)
- Founder: Mahmud Pasha
- Completed: 1567 CE

Specifications
- Dome: 1
- Minaret: 1

The Al-Mahmoudia Mosque (Arabic: مسجد المحمودية), also known as the Mosque of Mahmud Pasha, is a mosque and mausoleum, located in the Salah al-Din Square in the Citadel area of Islamic Cairo, Egypt. It is situated in front of Bab al-Azab gate of the citadel. The Sultan Hassan Mosque and Al-Rifa'i Mosque are adjacent, to the east.

== History ==
The mosque dates from 1567 CE, during the Ottoman era administration of Mahmud Pasha, who is buried in the mosque. The mosque was named in his honour.

== Architecture ==
The mosque is attached to the mausoleum of Mahmud Pasha which is accessible through the door on the mihrab wall. Mahmud Pasha was shot dead near the mosque after being accused of oppressing the Egyptian people.

The design of the mosque is unique in its architectural style which follows the Mamluk tradition for the main building and is partly based on the Ottoman architecture for the minaret in particular. The minaret is decorated with a ring with muqarnas and a cone shaped obelisk on top. It is noted to be smaller than the other mosques in the same area, and it is partly because the building was built on top of the pile of stones, and it is required to climb up stairs to the mosque. The mosque has four sides, and two of them have entrance gates. The gates are ornamented with two lines of windows filled with plasters and maroon glass works, with muqarnas on top of them facing toward the balconies.

=== Condition ===
The mosque was restored by Farouk I in 1940. The restoration reinforced the vaults and fixed the ceiling.

In 2015, the Ministry of Antiquity reported that the minaret of the mosque is in danger of collapsing at any moment if there’s no adequate measure to be implemented. The picture released by Youm 7 showed the cracks on the wall behind the minaret.

== See also ==
- Islam in Egypt
- List of mausoleums in Cairo
- List of mosques in Cairo
