= Massacre in Nicosia =

1570 Ottoman killing of Greeks in Cyprus

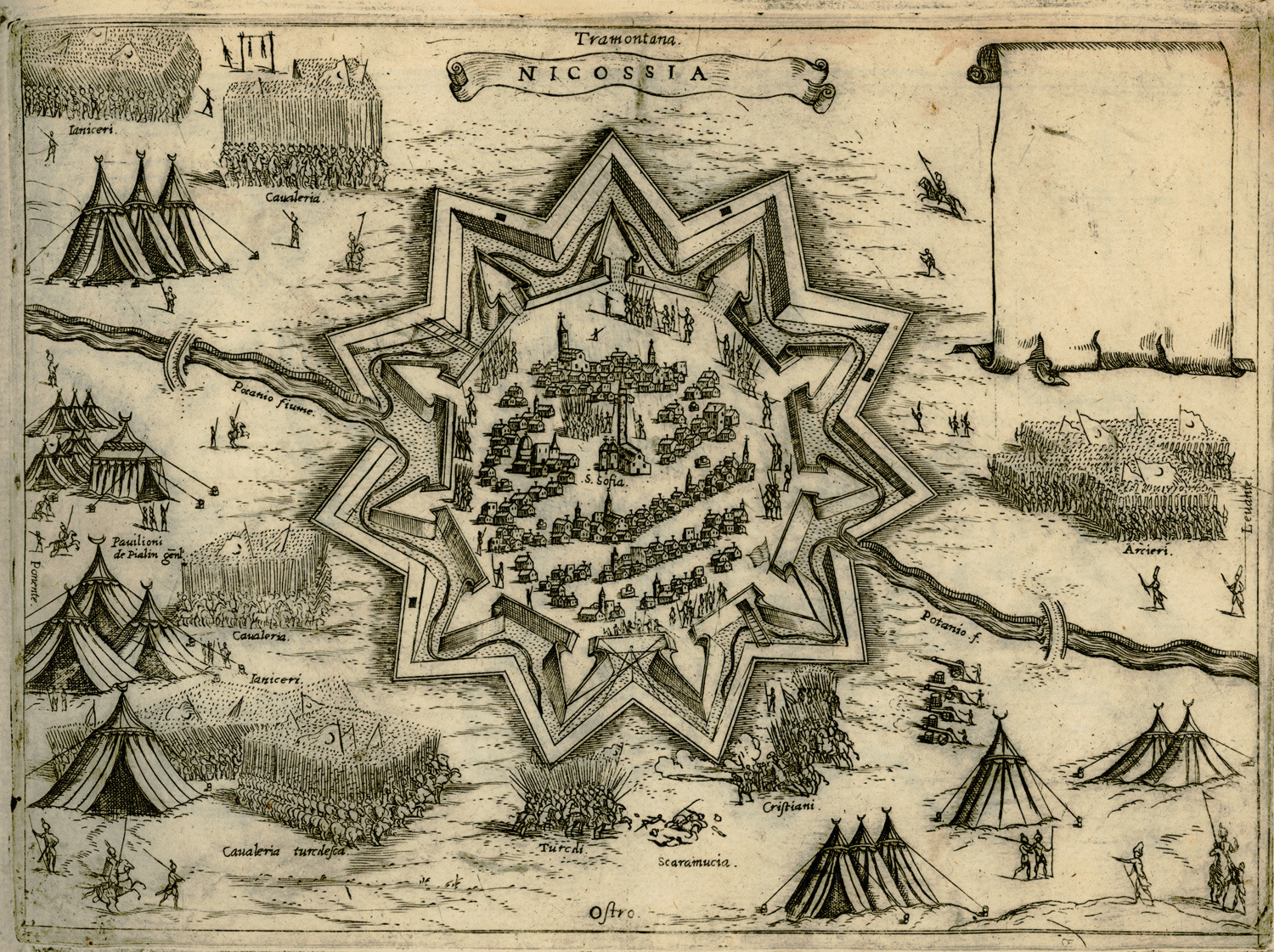
Map of the siege of Nicosia, by Giovanni Camoccio, 1574

The Massacre in Nicosia was the massacre of over 20,000 Greeks in Nicosia, Cyprus, committed by forces of the Ottoman Empire during the Ottoman–Venetian War of 1570–1573.

== Events ==
On 3 July 1570, Cyprus was invaded by troops of the Ottoman Empire. On 22 July Piali Pasha, having captured Paphos, Limassol and Larnaca, marched his army towards Nicosia and laid siege to the city. The city managed to last for over a month under siege until its fall on 9 September 1570. On that day, the 15th assault succeeded in breaching the walls after the defenders had exhausted their ammunition. Approximately 20,000 Greek inhabitants died during and following the siege and every church, public building, and palace was looted. Even the city's pigs, regarded as unclean by Muslims, were killed, and only women and boys who were captured to be sold as slaves were spared.

A combined Christian fleet of 200 vessels, composed of Venetian (under Girolamo Zane), Papal (under Marcantonio Colonna), and Neapolitan/Genoese/Spanish (under Giovanni Andrea Doria) squadrons that had belatedly been assembled at Crete by late August and was sailing towards Cyprus, turned back when it received news of Nicosia's fall.

== Aftermath ==
Nicosia had an estimated population of 21,100 before the Ottoman invasion and, based on the Ottoman census data of 1572, the population was reduced to 1,100–1,200. The devastation of the city was so extensive that, for several years after the conquest, a number of Cypriot villages had a larger population than the city. The main churches, including Saint Sophia Cathedral, were converted into mosques.

Arnaude de Rocas is a legendary figure from Cyprus, remembered there as a martyr and a Cypriot heroine.

== Bibliography ==
- Hopkins, T.C.F. (2007). Confrontation at Lepanto: Christendom vs. Islam. Macmillan.
- Jennings, Ronald C. (1993). Christians and Muslims in Ottoman Cyprus and the Mediterranean World, 1571–1640. New York University Press.
- Parry, V. J. (1976). "The Successors of Sulaimān, 1566–1617, 1566–1617". In Cook, M. A. (ed.). A History of the Ottoman Empire to 1730: Chapters from the Cambridge History of Islam and the New Cambridge Modern History. Cambridge University Press Archive. ISBN 978-0-521-20891-8.
- Setton, Kenneth Meyer (1976). The Papacy and the Levant, 1204-1571: The thirteenth and fourteenth centuries. American Philosophical Society. ISBN 9780871691149.
- Theocharides, Ioannis (2012). "Nicosia Under Ottoman Rule 1570–1878: Part I". Rimal Books.
- Turnbull, Stephen (2003). The Ottoman Empire 1326–1699. Essential Histories Series #62. Osprey Publishing. ISBN 978-0-415-96913-0.
