= The Honest Courtesan =

1993 book by Margaret Rosenthal

- Cover of the book
- Author: Margaret Rosenthal
- Language: English
- Genre: Biography
- Publication date: February 1, 1993
- Publication place: United States

The Honest Courtesan is a 1993 book by Margaret Rosenthal, a biography of Veronica Franco, the 16th-century Venetian courtesan.

== Description ==
"The Venetian courtesan has long captured the imagination as a female symbol of sexual license, elegance, beauty and unruliness. What then to make of the cortigiana onesta - the honest courtesan who recast virtue as intellectual integrity and offered wit and refinement in return for patronage and a place in public life?" Veronica Franco (1546–1591) was such a woman, a writer and citizen of Venice, whose published poems and letters offer testimony to the complexity of the honest courtesan's position.

== Adaptation ==
The book was adapted for the 1998 film Dangerous Beauty, directed by Marshall Herskovitz and starring Catherine McCormack as Franco. Also released as A Destiny of Her Own in some regions, the film was re-titled The Honest Courtesan for video release in the United Kingdom and Europe in 1999.

== First edition ==
The Honest Courtesan : Veronica Franco, Citizen and Writer in Sixteenth-Century Venice. Margaret F. Rosenthal. Chicago : University of Chicago Press, 1992. ISBN 0-226-72811-0 (hardbound), ISBN 0-226-72812-9 (paperback)
