= Veronica Franco =

Italian poet and courtesan (c. 1546–1591)

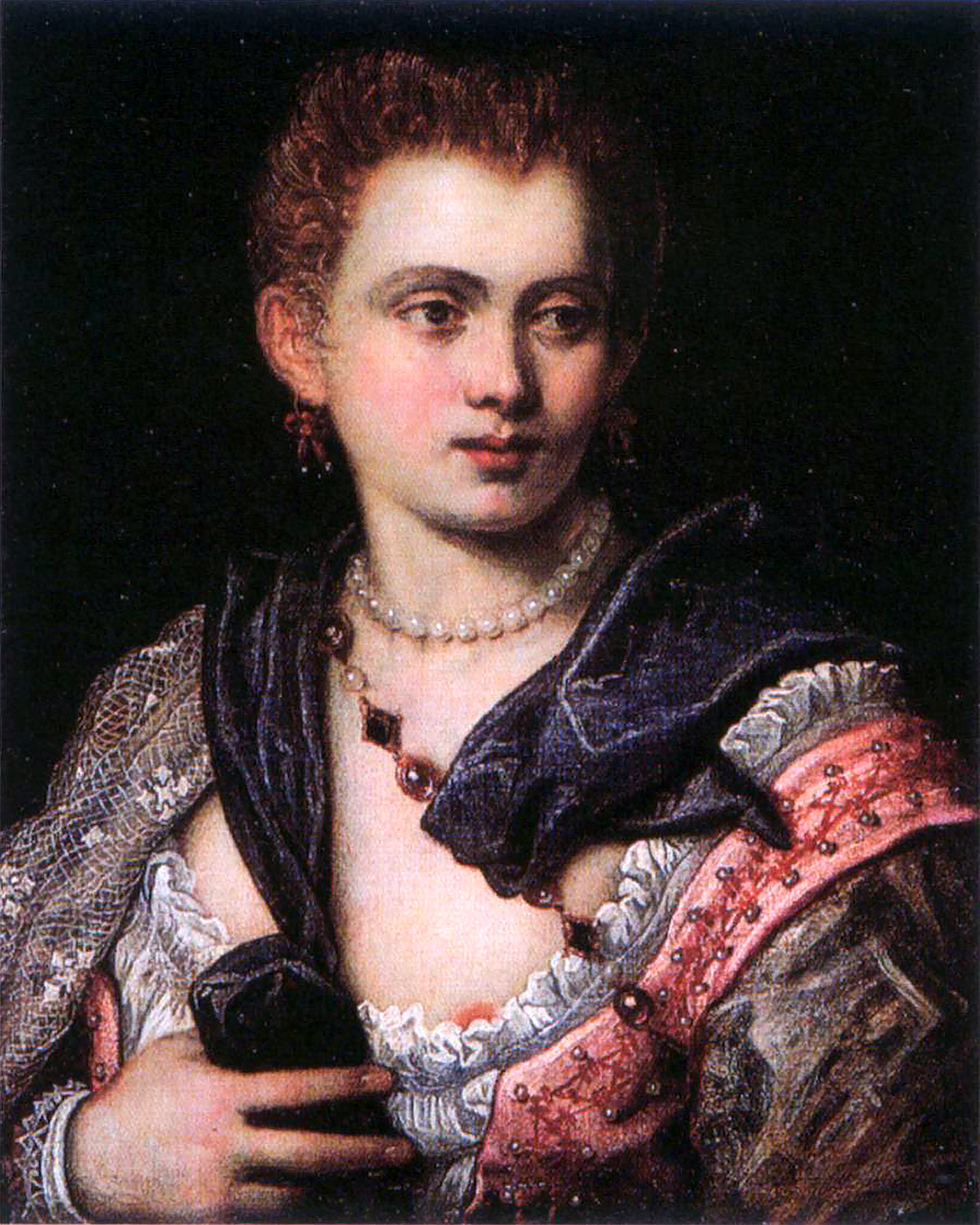
- Portrait by Tintoretto, c. 1575
- Born: c. 1546; Venice, Republic of Venice
- Died: 1591 (aged 44–45); Venice, Republic of Venice
- Occupations: Poet; courtesan
- Spouse: Paolo Panizza (divorced)
- Children: 6
- Writing career
- Years active: c. 1560s–1591
- Movement: Mannerism

Veronica Franco (c. 1546–1591) was an Italian poet and courtesan in 16th-century Venice. She is known for her notable clientele, feminist advocacy, literary contributions, and philanthropy. Her humanist education and cultural contributions influenced the roles of courtesans in the late Venetian Renaissance.

In her notable works, Capitoli in Terze rime and Lettere familiari a diversi ("Familiar Letters to Various People"), Franco uses perceived virtue, reason, and fairness to advise male patricians and other associates. She exercised greater autonomy in her authorship than any other traditional Venetian woman due to her established reputation and influence.

== Early life and education ==
Veronica Franco was born to a family in the Cittadino class. She developed her position in Renaissance Venetian society as a cortigiana onesta (an 'honoured courtesan'), who were intellectual sex workers who derived their position in society from refinement and cultural prowess. They served in contrast to other sex workers such as cortigiana di lume or meretrice ('harlots') who were lower-class prostitutes.

Franco received a respectable humanistic education at a young age from her brother's tutor, an unusual opportunity for Venetian women. She continued her education by mixing with learned men, writers, and painters. This granted her access to a Domenico Venier, a patron and advisor to women writers. She was able to use her education to contribute considerably to literary and artistic outlets.

Franco learned additional skills from her mother, Paola Fracassa, who had an interest in finding suitable clients for her, as well as marrying her off.

== Career ==
Franco wrote two volumes of poetry: Terze rime in 1575 and Lettere familiari a diversi in 1580.

In 1565, when she was about 20 years old, Veronica Franco was listed in the Catalogo de tutte le principal et più honorate cortigiane di Venetia (Catalog of all the Principal and most Honored Courtesans of Venice), which gave the names, addresses, and fees of Venice's most prominent prostitutes; her mother was listed as the person to whom the fee should be paid (her "go-between").

She became involved in the 1570s with Domenico Venier's renowned literary salon in Venice, who served as a literary adviser not only to male writers but also to many women poets of the Veneto region.

As one of the più honorate cortigiane in a wealthy and cosmopolitan city, Franco lived well for much of her working life, but without the automatic protection accorded to "respectable" women, she had to make her own way. She studied and sought patrons among the learned.

In 1575, during the epidemic of plague that ravaged the city, Franco was forced to leave Venice and lost much of her wealth when her house and possessions were looted. Upon her return in 1577, she defended herself against charges of witchcraft before the Inquisition, a crime commonly lodged against courtesans in those days. The charges were dropped. There is evidence that her connections among the Venetian nobility helped in her acquittal.

== Writings ==
In 1575, Franco's first volume of poetry was published, her Terze rime, containing 18 capitoli (verse epistles) by her and 7 by men writing in her praise. That same year saw an outbreak of plague in Venice, one that lasted two years and caused Franco to leave the city and to lose many of her possessions. In 1577, she unsuccessfully proposed to the city council that it should establish a home for poor women, of which she would become the administrator.

In 1580, Franco published her Lettere familiari a diversi ("Familiar Letters to Various People") which included 50 letters, as well as two sonnets addressed to King Henry III of France.

Franco's success was not limited to being a coveted courtesan. It was her wittiness and often criticized voice that was immortalized by way of being published that brought forth much recognition. Records indicate that the number of actual publications was limited as they were thought to have been at her own expense or private publications. Her work is known to have been included in an anthology of women poets in the 18th century (1726) that was edited by Luisa Bergalli.

"When we too are armed and trained, we can convince men that we have hands, feet, and a heart like yours; and although we may be delicate and soft, some men who are delicate are also strong; and others, coarse and harsh, are cowards. Women have not yet realized this, for if they should decide to do so, they would be able to fight you until death; and to prove that I speak the truth, amongst so many women, I will be the first to act, setting an example for them to follow."

— Veronica Franco

The embodiment of her role in the public realm was made evermore tangible, amongst the literary circles and the Venetian public during her polemic literary battle with Maffio Venier. The poem referenced above, Capitolo XVI, A Challenge to a Poet Who Has Defamed Her, is believed to have been one of the many directed to Maffio Venier. These poems are Capitolo XIII, Capitolo XVI, and Capitolo XXIII of her literary publication Terze Rime.

== Personal life ==
From extant records, we know that, by the time she was 18, Franco was briefly married to a mature, wealthy physician named Paolo Panizza. During her marriage she gave birth to her first child. She would eventually have six children, three of whom died in infancy.

She supported her children along with a household of tutors and servants for most of her life.

== Later life and death ==
Her later life is largely obscure, though surviving records suggest that although she won her freedom, she lost all of her material goods and wealth. Eventually, her last major benefactor died and left her with no financial support. There is little information for her life after 1580. Records suggest that she was less prosperous in her later years and is believed to have died in 1591 in relative poverty.

== Posthumous reception ==
In the 1974 film "Sex Through the Ages" (originally titled "On the Game"), Louise Pajo plays the part of Veronica Franco. In the film, she appears in two scenes — one in which she seduces the homosexual King of France, Henry III; and another in which she is a sufferer of syphilis.

Franco's life was recorded in the 1992 book The Honest Courtesan by U.S. author Margaret F. Rosenthal.

Catherine McCormack portrays Veronica Franco in the 1998 movie Dangerous Beauty, released as A Destiny of Her Own in some countries, based on Rosenthal's book.

In the 2000s Franco prompted scholarly inquiries on "what it meant to be a public woman in Cinquecento Venice". This directly pertained to her duality as both a courtesan and a published poet. Franco is said to have been a "living performance of public art—a renowned courtesan whose body was available to a certain exclusive clientele, a published author, and a public presence." Franco's literary work demonstrates her ability to defend women, as a whole, in a format that can be studied and understood as ahead of her time. Franco's work fearlessly embarked on juxtaposed realms such as sexuality and women's agency as a whole. In doing so, she challenged and disrupted the patriarchal norms that surrounded her.

Franco is also portrayed in the 2012 Serbian novel named after her (Serbian: Штампар и Вероника), authored by Serbian writer Katarina Brajović.

In 2013, her work was interpreted as adopting "a position of public authority that calls attention to her education, her rhetorical skill, and the solidarity she feels with women." In her writing she embodied a duality, toggling between and addressing matters of both private and public life. Her publications have allowed her work and proto-feminist efforts to transcend time.
