= Postage stamps and postal history of the Palestinian National Authority =

A stamp from 1994, the first year of PNA stamps

The Palestinian National Authority began in 1994 to issue stamps and operate postal services as authorized by the Oslo Accords.

== Postal service ==
Starting in 1994–95, the Palestinian National Authority (PNA) established post offices throughout the PNA, developed its own unique postmarks and issued stamps. In its first decade, the PNA expanded from 49 to 82 post offices (1994–2004). It provides a range of mailing services and issued its first stamp booklets in 2000.

In 1999, the PNA and Israel agreed that PNA mail could be sent directly to Egypt and Jordan. Earlier, the PNA had claimed that Israel had violated its agreements regarding postal service by impeding mail to Egypt and Jordan. When mail addressed to Arab countries could not be delivered, it was marked with a "no service" cachet because it could not be forwarded. The lack of forwarding has been due apparently to Israeli policy and the Arab boycott. At times, The PNA's Ministry of Telecom & Information Technology issued a critical report on postal services in areas under Israeli control. In 2002, the minister of PNA Post and Telecommunications, Imad al-Faluji, claimed that Israel had destroyed its post offices in Gaza.

Prior to 2021, the PNA did not have postcodes or addressing rules that would help automate and improve delivery services. A project to develop such a system started in 2010 with preliminary codes and a map being published in January 2011. In February 2021, the Palestinian Authority announced the implementation of its own postal codes, and that postal items not bearing a postal code would not be processed after April. This move came in part with an intent to assert Palestinian sovereignty, however, post in Palestine is still subject to seizure and blockades as it passes through Jordan and/or Israel prior to delivery. Palestinian postcodes begin with the capital letter 'P', followed by three digits which represent the governorate, postal sector, and zone respectively. Four characters may be appended to the postcode which indicate the final point of delivery.

== Recognition of PNA postal authority ==
The PNA maintains relations with the Universal Postal Union, though it is not a member. In 2007, PNA minister Kamel Hassounah met with UPU director general Edouard Dayan.

The PNA is authorized to manage postal operations, issue stamps and postal stationery, and set rates, under agreements signed between Israel and the PNA following the Oslo Accords. The agreements specifically regulate the wording that can be used on the stamps issued, specifying that they "shall include only the terms 'the Palestinian Council' or 'the Palestinian Authority.'"

The first PNA stamps, printed by German state printer Bundesdruckerei Berlin, used the currency designation mils (which was the currency of the British Mandate of Palestine between 1927 and 1948). Israel protested over this issue, and all early stamps issued in 1994 had to be overprinted with fils (1/1000 of a Jordanian dinar), as illustrated by the souvenir sheet shown. A Palestinian newspaper, The Jerusalem Times, broke the story of the mils mistake on the stamps.

Initially, PNA stamps were recognized only by Arab states, according to the PNA minister of post and telecommunications.

Israel approved of PNA postage, following disputes over the currency designation, in November 1995. Direct mail service with Jordan is said to have resumed in 2007. Deliveries between the PNA and foreign countries are made through commercial agreements with Egypt, Israel, and Jordan. The Universal Postal Union and its member countries generally do not recognize stamps issued by entities that have not achieved full independence, such as the lands controlled in the Gaza Strip and West Bank by the PNA. Indeed, its accord with Israel (Article 29) stipulates that the PNA's lack of membership in the Universal Postal Union would not change, nor would the PNA seek to change its status. The UPU and PNA do maintain relations (see picture). Nonetheless, it has become clear that the stamps issued by the PNA were functioning for postal activities within Palestine and for international postal communications. According to the New York Times, the doubts of stamp collectors were removed by the listing of the PNA in philatelic catalogs. Accordingly, collectors are analyzing not only stamps but also such matters as Palestinian postmarks and tariffs.

Besides their postal role, Israeli post offices have played a pivotal role in political affairs for Palestinians in East Jerusalem. In 1996 and 2006, Israeli post offices in East Jerusalem served as voting stations for Palestinian elections.

=== Post-2009 situation ===
Due to the political split between the Fatah-controlled West Bank and the Hamas-controlled Gaza Strip in 2009, there exist two separate postal administrations: The Ministry of Telecom & Information Technology in Gaza, and Palestine Post of the Palestinian Ministry of Telecom & IT in Ramallah/al-Bireh. Both are issuing stamps for their respective areas, although for international use only the PNA stamps issued in the West Bank are valid.

== Postage stamps issued ==
PNA souvenir sheet of 1994, reissued with fils overprint in 1995

The Scott Publishing Company began incorporating stamps issued by the PNA into its catalogue of worldwide stamps in 1999. The initial listing was for the 77 stamps issued between 1994 and July 1997 and appeared in the July issue of Scott Stamp Monthly, the company's magazine for collectors.

In 1994, the PNA's stamps featured the Palestinian flag, architectural scenes, and a souvenir sheet a commemorative of the Gaza–Jericho Agreement. It also issued a series of six official mail stamps. In 1995, due to pressure from Israel, the 1994 designs were reissued with an overprint of fils as its currency; for an example, see the Gaza-Jericho souvenir sheet pictured.

The genuine PNA stamp featuring Pope John Paul II

PNA stamps have honored various individuals: Yasser Arafat (1996), the visiting Pope John Paul II (1996), German politician Hans-Jürgen Wischnewski (1997), Mother Teresa (1997), U.S. President Bill Clinton signing the Wye River Memorandum, French President Jacques Chirac, and artist Ibrahim Hazimeh, whose fours works appear on a souvenir sheet (2001).

The PNA also has commemorated anniversaries of the Arab League with a souvenir sheet, philatelic exhibitions with landscape photographs placed in gutter blocks honoring (1996), a series and sheet for the 1996 Atlanta Olympics, the return of Hong Kong to China (1997), the first elections within the PNA (a 1996 souvenir sheet), the opening of the Gaza airport, and the PNA's admission to the United Nations (1998). The PNA produced three stamps with inset reproductions of Mandate stamps. The PNA also issues annual Christmas stamps, such as a nativity scene series on a souvenir sheet (1996).

A fake stamp, quite unlike the PNA's commemorative of Pope John Paul II

Themes chosen for PNA stamps include: two series of Palestinian costumes (1997, 2002), local plants (1996), birds, photographs of 19th century Gaza and Hebron, the Canaanite god Baal, Byzantium era mosaics, butterflies, horses, tales of the Arabian nights, the airship LZ 127 Graf Zeppelin, cacti (2003), Palestinian universities, folk art (2003). Along its nature themes, stamps were issued with the World Wildlife Fund (2001).

The PNA did not issue any new stamps in 2004 or 2007. In 2008 a set of for stamps commemorating the late poet Mahmoud Darwish has been released.

=== Forgeries ===
A number of forgeries of PNA stamps have been sold, for instance on eBay. These illegal stamps include a series on chessmasters Garry Kasparov and Anatoly Karpov and Pope John Paul II, as pictured here. The authentic PNA stamp of the Pope is shown above it.

=== Philatelic Bureaux ===
Originally all philatelic services were based at the GPO in Gaza City, but since the political split between the Fatah-controlled West Bank and the Hamas-controlled Gaza Strip in 2009 there exist two offices selling stamps, FDCs, etc., issued by their respective authorities to collectors:

- Ministry of Telecom & Information Technology (Gaza): General Post Office, Omer al-Mukhtar, Gaza City.
- Palestine Post (West Bank): Post Office al-Bireh

== See also ==
- Postage stamps and postal history of Palestine

== References and sources ==
Sources

- Kassim, Anis F., ed. (1997). The Palestine Yearbook of International Law, 1995. Vol. 8. Al-Shaybani Society of International Law. Kluwer Law International. ISBN 90-411-0314-7.
- Wallach, Josef: The gradual termination of the Israeli postal services in the Gaza Strip and Jericho, May 4–17, 1994: an eye-witness report. Holy Land Postal History. Vol. 3, no. 59, 1994, pp. 1023–1036.
- Wallach, Josef: The transition period of the Palestinian Authority post: part 1; pen cancellation & provisional postmarks. Holy Land Postal History. Vol. 4, no. 65/66, 1996, pp. 149–157.
- Wallach, Josef: The transition period of the Palestinian Authority post: part 2; the external postal communications from the Palestinian Authority. Holy Land Postal History. Vol. 4, no. 73/74, 1997, pp. 418–429.
- Zywietz, Tobias: Registration marks and labels of the Palestinian National Authority. The Israel Philatelist. Vol. 58, 2007, no. 4, pp. 156–157; and The BAPIP Bulletin. Vol. 17, no. 156, 2007, pp. 1–6.
- Zywietz, Tobias: The postmarks of the Palestinian National Authority: part 1: a classification of types. The Israel Philatelist. Vol. 60, 2009, no. 3, pp. 104–107; and The BAPIP Bulletin. Vol. 17, no. 159, 2009, pp. 19–23.
