= Palestine Post =

- البريد الفلسطيني

Government Department overview
- Headquarters: al-Bireh, West Bank
- Government Department executive: Fathi Shobak, Director General
- Parent Government Department: Ministry of Transport
- Website: palpost.ps

Palestine Post (Arabic: البريد الفلسطيني) is the company responsible for postal service in the State of Palestine.

== See also ==
- Postage stamps and postal history of the Palestinian National Authority
- Postage stamps and postal history of Palestine
