= Hanna Siniora =

Palestinian publisher and politician

- حنا سيفرا
- Born: 6 November 1937 (age 89); Jerusalem, Mandatory Palestine
- Education: Bachelor of Science Pharmacy in Benares, India
- Occupations: Editor, Publisher, Activist
- Known for: His support for peace between Israelis and Palestinians
- Children: 3
- Awards: Knight of Malta

Hanna Siniora (Arabic: حنا سيفرا; born 6 November 1937) is a Palestinian Christian who lives in East Jerusalem. He is the publisher of The Jerusalem Times and a co-Chief Executive Officer of the Israel/Palestine Center for Research and Information. He is also a member of the Palestine National Council and the chairperson of the Palestinian-American Chamber of Commerce.

An early proponent of dialogue and negotiations with Israel, Siniora has a long history of involvement in pro-peace activities. For his lifetime commitment to working towards Palestinian-Israeli peace, he was awarded the Order of the Knights of Malta.

== Biography ==
Born in Jerusalem in 1937, Siniora completed his Bachelor of Science in pharmacy at a university in Benares, India in 1969, at which time he returned to the West Bank. In February 1974, he was asked to manage the Arabic language newspaper Al Fajr after its editor-in-chief, Yusuf Nasr, was kidnapped. He established an English language version of Al Fajr in 1980 and served as its editor, and was later granted the position of editor-in-chief of the Arabic-language version in 1983.

Siniora was the fourth supported leader among the Palestinians living in the US according the results of a survey carried out in 1988. Siniora is a Roman Catholic.

== See also ==
- Palestinian Christians
