= Harrison & Sons Collection =

Collection of postage stamps of Egypt and Palestine

The Harrison & Sons Collection is a collection of postage stamps of Egypt and Palestine that forms part of the British Library Philatelic Collections. The collection is mainly of the Egypt 1921–22 issue and the Palestine 1927–45 issue and was donated by De La Rue plc in 2002.

== See also ==
- Postage stamps and postal history of Egypt
- Postage stamps and postal history of Palestine
