= Postage stamps and postal history of Egypt =

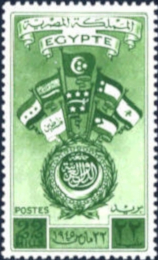
A 1945 stamp of Egypt

This is a survey of the postage stamps and postal history of Egypt.

== Pre-stamp era ==
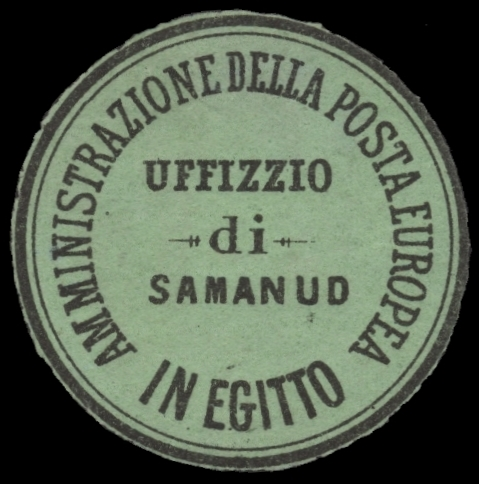
An 1864 POSTA EUROPEA stamp

Handstamps were first introduced during the Napoleonic period, 1798–1800. Single line handstamps are known from "ALEXANDRIE", "LE CAIRE", "BENESOUEF" and "SIOUTH".

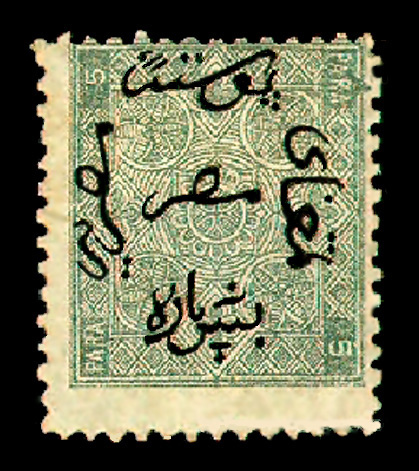
An 1866 stamp of Egypt

Carlo Meratti, an Italian, set up the first postal system in Egypt in 1821. This was a private enterprise which in 1842 was named "POSTA EUROPEA". The Egyptian Government, in 1857, sanctioned it to carry on all inland postal services. This concession was purchased by the Egyptian Government and on 1 January 1865 it took control of this service. This service was renamed to "POSTE VICE-REALI EGIZIAN".

== First stamps ==
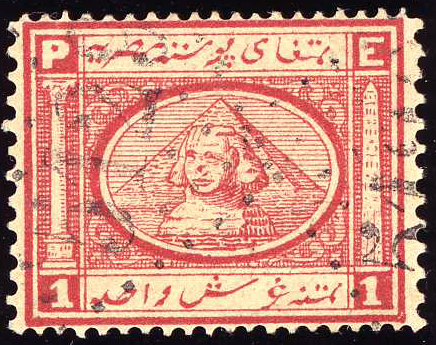
An 1867 stamp of Egypt

First Egyptian stamps were issued on 1 January 1866. The 1867 issue featured a pyramid and the sphinx. Stamps issued in 1872 were inscribed in Italian "Poste Khedive Egiziane'. Egypt joined the UPU in 1875. From 1879 stamps were inscribed in French.

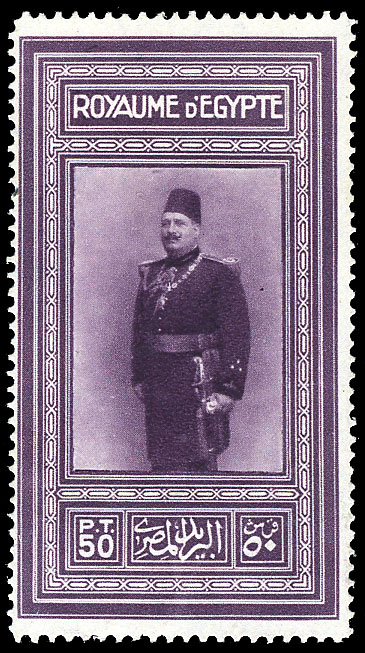
A 1926 stamp of Egypt depicting Fuad I

It was occupied by British forces during the Anglo-Egyptian War in 1882, Egypt remained an autonomous province of the Ottoman Empire, but the British occupation constituted a de facto protectorate over the country. In 1914, Egypt was declared a British protectorate when the Ottoman Empire joined the First World War on the side of the Central Powers.

== Kingdom ==
Egypt gained nominal independence from the British Empire as the Kingdom of Egypt in 1922 with Fuad I as King of Egypt.

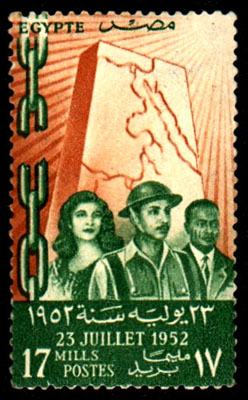
A 1952 stamp marking the revolution

== Republic ==
Following the 1952 revolution, Egypt declared itself a republic in 1953.

== United Arab Republic ==
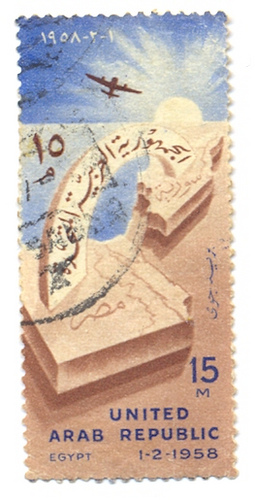
A 1958 stamp inscribed "United Arab Republic"

In 1958 Egypt merged with Syria to form the United Arab Republic. Stamps were labeled "United Arab Republic" or more commonly UAR. After Syria's withdrawal from the union in 1961, Egypt retained its "United Arab Republic" name until 1971.

== Egyptian post offices in foreign countries ==
Post offices in Sudan, the Ottoman Empire and in East Africa were opened by the Egyptian postal administration. No special stamps were used, only normal Egyptian stamps; thus, they can only be identified by the cancellation.

=== Sudan ===
According to records a total of 27 post offices were opened in Sudan – but cancellations are known only from 11 of these. Egyptian stamps were in use in Sudan between 1867 and 1897.

=== Ottoman Empire ===
A total of twenty post offices were opened in the Ottoman Empire; the locations are now Turkey, Greece, Lebanon, Saudi Arabia, Palestine and Syria. These were in operation for only a few years between 1865 and 1881.

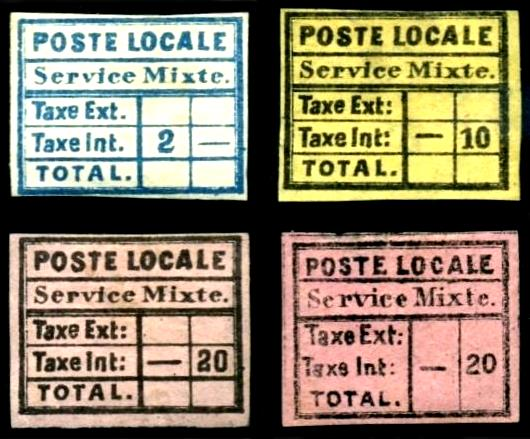
The 1866 local stamps of Liannos et Cie for the Egyptian postal service in Constantinople

In 1865 the local post distribution company Liannos et Cie was established in Constantinople to distribute mail arriving in the city which was not addressed in Arabic as the staff of the Ottoman Postal Service were unable to read the Latin alphabet. In 1866 a second service was set up on behalf of the Egyptian post office operating in the city to solve the same problem. Both services were short lived.

=== East Africa ===
Four post offices were opened in what is now Somalia and one in present-day Eritrea. They were open between 1867 and 1885.

== Palestine issues ==
Egypt provided the postal stamps for Gaza between 1948 and 1967. On May 5, 1948, Egypt set up postal services and issued overprints of Egyptian stamps with Palestine in Arabic and English.

== Suez Canal Company issues ==
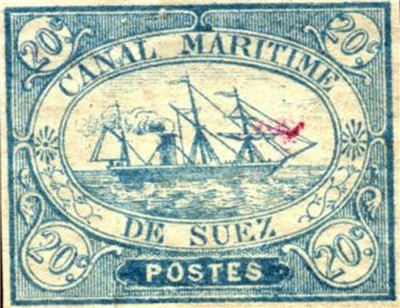
An 1868 stamp used by Suez Canal Company

Stamps were issued by the Suez Canal Company in 1868 for postal service between Port Said and Suez before the service was incorporated into the Egyptian postal services.

== Foreign post offices in Egypt ==
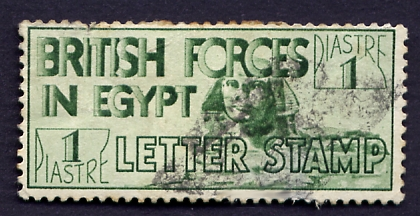
A military postage stamp used by the British forces in Egypt

British, French, Italian, Austrian, Russian and Greek post offices operated on Egyptian soil, particularly in Alexandria and Port Said.

=== British Forces in Egypt ===
British troops used special stamps inscribed BRITISH FORCES IN EGYPT or ARMY POST EGYPT from 1932 until 1941.

== See also ==
- Egypt Post
- French post offices in Egypt
- Postage stamps and postal history of Syria
- Postage stamps and postal history of Palestine
- Harrison & Sons Collection
- Peter Feltus

== References and sources ==
Sources

- Stanley Gibbons Stamp Catalogue Part 19 Middle East, 2005, ISBN 0-85259-576-X
- Billigs Philatelic Handbook Vol 37, 1948
