= Farrukh dynasty =

Palestinian dynasty

The Farrukh dynasty was a household based in Nablus whose members served multiple terms as sanjak-beys (district governors) of Nablus and Jerusalem Sanjak in Palestine and as amir al-hajj (commander of the Hajj caravan) in the 17th century during Ottoman rule. In their capacity as amir al-hajj, they were often appointed as sanjak-beys of Ajlun and Karak-Shawbak in Transjordan, through which the Hajj caravan passed.

The founder of the dynasty was a Circassian mamluk, Farrukh Bey (later Farrukh Pasha), who succeeded his master Bahram Pasha as governor of Jerusalem in 1603 and then appointed to Nablus in 1609. He made Nablus his family's seat and would hold both governorships and the Hajj command for most of the remainder of his life. Farrukh was succeeded by his son Muhammad Bey ibn Farrukh, who served less frequently over Jerusalem due to local complaints about his harsh rule but was kept as governor of Nablus and commander of the Hajj due to his loyalty and consistent success. After his death in 1638, Muhammad's sons Ali and Assaf, especially the latter, served multiple terms as Hajj commander and governor of Nablus and/or Jerusalem. With Assaf's death in 1670, members of the household continued to form part of the local elite of Jerusalem and Nablus through the 18th century but never regained office.

The Farrukhs maintained close kinship ties and military and economic alliances with other local leaderships in Palestine, namely the Bedouin Turabay dynasty of Lajjun Sanjak and the Gaza-based Ridwan dynasty, the latter of whom also had slave origins like the Farrukhs. Together, the three families formed a unified dynasty with authority over most of Palestine during the 17th century. The Farrukhs had extensive property holdings in Nablus and Ramla and Farrukh Pasha patronized the construction of the Khan al-Farrukhiya caravansary of Nablus and the renovation of the Dome of the Prophet on Jerusalem's Haram al-Sharif (Temple Mount).

== Origins ==
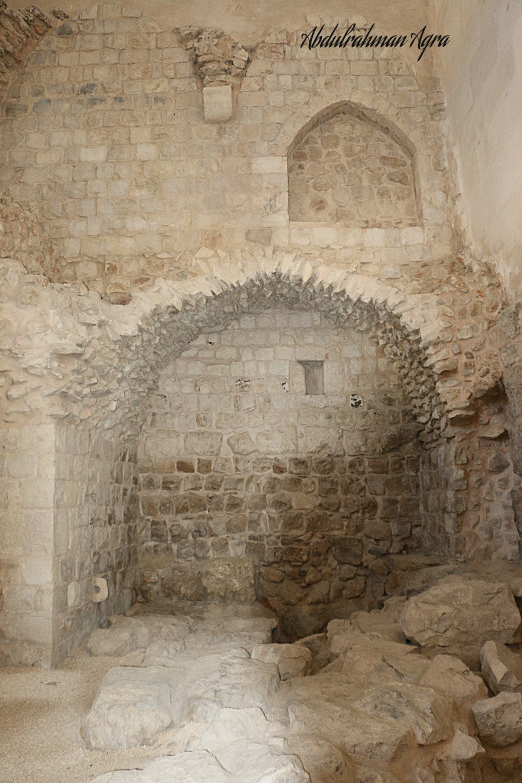
Remains of the Khan al-Farrukhiya, a caravanserai built by Farrukh Pasha

The founder of the dynasty, Farrukh Pasha, was born in Circassia, where he was either captured or purchased as a slave. He became a mamluk (freed slave soldier) of Bahram Pasha, a brother of Ridwan Pasha and sanjak-bey (district governor) of Nablus in the late 16th century. Under Bahram's patronage, Farrukh was well educated and trained for a government career. In 1596, Bahram's influence helped Farrukh gain the appointment of Jerusalem Sanjak's subashi (officer in charge of public order).

== Governors of Jerusalem and Nablus and commanders of the Hajj ==
=== Farrukh Pasha ===
In 1603, following Bahram's death, Farrukh was appointed sanjak-bey of Jerusalem. By 1605 he appears to have already been appointed sanjak-bey of Nablus while still holding the governorship of Jerusalem based on a Jerusalem court record. Another court record dated to 1607–1608 refers to him as the former governor of Jerusalem, indicating he had been dismissed from that post prior. In 1609, Farrukh was appointed or re-confirmed as sanjak-bey of Nablus. Between 1609 and his death in 1620–1621, he served multiple terms as the governor of Jerusalem or Nablus or both. The Damascene historian and Farrukh's contemporary, Muhammad Amin al-Muhibbi, described Farrukh Pasha as a "distinguished hero, of fearless heart" and as courageous and generous.

Farrukh also held the prestigious office of amir al-hajj (commander of the Hajj caravan) on multiple occasions. As amir al-hajj in 1611 he met with Grand Vizier Nasuh Pasha in Aleppo, whereupon he was granted the governorships of Nablus, Ajlun and Karak-Shawbak; control of the latter two sanjaks was customary at the time for the Hajj commander as the Hajj caravan route passed through their deserts. These offices were also intended to strengthen Farrukh Pasha's position against Fakhr al-Din Ma'n, the Druze strongman and Ottoman governor of Sidon-Beirut and Safed, and the latter's ally Hamdan Qansuh, the local strongman of Ajlun who contended for the governorship of the sanjak and the lucrative office of amir al-hajj. Nasuh Pasha had sought to bring Fakhr al-Din to heel due to his accumulating power as a regional strongman and relations with the Ottomans' European adversaries. Farrukh assumed control of Ajlun and Karak-Shawbak in August 1611, with Hamdan Qansuh withdrawing without incident.

In May 1613, Fakhr al-Din's forces defeated those of Farrukh and the commander of the Damascene janissaries, Kan'an Bolukbashi, at Muzayrib in the Hauran, after which they moved to reinstall Hamdan Qansuh to Ajlun. Not long after, a campaign against Fakhr al-Din was launched by the governor of Damascus, Kuchuk Ahmed Pasha, and Hamdan Qansuh fled the region. Farrukh continued to hold the governorship of Ajlun until 1615 and may have been represented there by a deputy, Banki Mustafa, with support from Hamdan's brothers Sayf and Bashir. In 1621, Farrukh is again recorded as amir al-hajj and on his recommendation, the authorities replaced Hamdan's son Ahmad Qansuh as governor of Ajlun with his uncle, Farrukh's ally Bashir, and likewise replaced the Mafarija chief Amr ibn Jabr as sheikh of the Hauran with another ally, Rashid ibn Salama of the Sardiyya tribe. Around May 1621, Farrukh was summoned to the imperial capital of Constantinople to discuss the construction of a fort at al-Mu'azzam, a waystation and water source of the Hajj caravan route north of Tabuk. Farrukh died while commanding the Hajj caravan en route to Mecca.

=== Muhammad ibn Farrukh ===
Muhammad succeeded his father as governor of Nablus and Jerusalem after his father's death. He was rumored to have had a hand in Farrukh's death and according to historian Dror Ze'evi, "inherited his father's courage, but was also remarkably cruel and ruthless". According to an anonymous letter written by a Jewish Jerusalemite, Muhammad was governor at least in 1625–1627. The Muslims living under his rule sent petitions to the sultan calling for protection from Muhammad and Christian and Jewish residents of Jerusalem sent letters to their coreligionists describing the inhabitants' suffering under him. As a result of frequent requests by the locals to the governor of Damascus and the imperial government to dismiss him from office, Muhammad's governorships of Jerusalem were infrequent and short-lived. Nevertheless, because of his success leading the annual Hajj caravan to Mecca as amir al-hajj and his loyalty to the state, the authorities generally kept him in place over Nablus.

In 1622, Fakhr al-Din Ma'n's aide Mustafa Kethuda was appointed governor of Nablus, but was unable to assume office due to local opposition. By June-July 1623, Muhammad was officially restored to office in Nablus. Muhammad married the daughter Ahmad Turabay, chief of the Bedouin Turabay dynasty which held the governorship of Lajjun, the sanjak which neigbored Nablus to the north, to seal their alliance against Fakhr al-Din. Alongside their ally and Muhammad's relative by marriage, the Ridwan governor of Gaza, 'Arab Hasan Pasha, they defeated Fakhr al-Din in a battle by the Awja River in 1623. On another occasion, Muhammad and Ahmad Turabay together raided several villages around Ramallah.

Muhammad died in 1638. Al-Muhibbi eulogized him as "one of the world's most famous heros and renowned noblemen". He further noted that Muhammad instilled fear in the Bedouins and was well read.

=== Assaf Pasha ===
Muhammad's son Assaf, whose mother may have been the granddaughter of the Turabay emir Ahmad ibn Turabay, held the post of amir al-hajj in 1665–1669. He was replaced in this post Musa Pasha al-Nimr and Assaf died in Konya on the way to the imperial capital Constantinople to attempt to regain the office. Assaf is recorded holding the governorship of Nablus in 1656–1657 and likely held the post before and after this period. He was again recorded as governor of Nablus as well as Jerusalem in 1668–1670 and was described with the honorific title of amir al-umara. Assaf's rule appeared to be more mild than his father's.

== Legacy ==
=== Descendants and holdings ===
Farrukh established the headquarters of his family in the town of Nablus. After Ali's death in 1656, his son Farrukh entered the care of his maternal uncle, the governor of Gaza, Husayn Pasha Ridwan. After Assaf's death, members of the Farrukh family continued to form part of the elite of Nablus and Jerusalem but did not regain office as governor. Assaf was survived by his wife Shaqra Khatun, a daughter of Husayn Pasha Ridwan and their two sons Muhammad Bey and Ali Bey and a daughter Mahmanud. These were left in the care of Musa Pasha Ridwan of Gaza (Husayn Pasha's brother and successor), who became trustee over Assaf's estate. Among the properties that formed his estate were the Wikala al-Farrukhiya (see below) and a large house in Nablus, as well as half a coffeehouse and half a soap factory, a bakery, a courtyard, four smaller residences, two flour mills, two shops, olive groves and other orchards. In Ramla he left a coffehouse, a bathhouse, large and small house, small rooms, an orange grove and vineyard and flour mills along the Awja River.

Muhammad ibn Farrukh's other son Ali, who served at least once as amir al-hajj, died in 1656 and his son, Farrukh, whose deceased mother was Husayn Pasha Ridwan's sister, afterward came under Husayn Pasha Ridwan's custodianship. Members of the family still constituted a part of the elite classes of Jerusalem, Nablus and Damascus through the 18th century, but none served as sanjak-beys after Assaf's death.

=== Building works ===
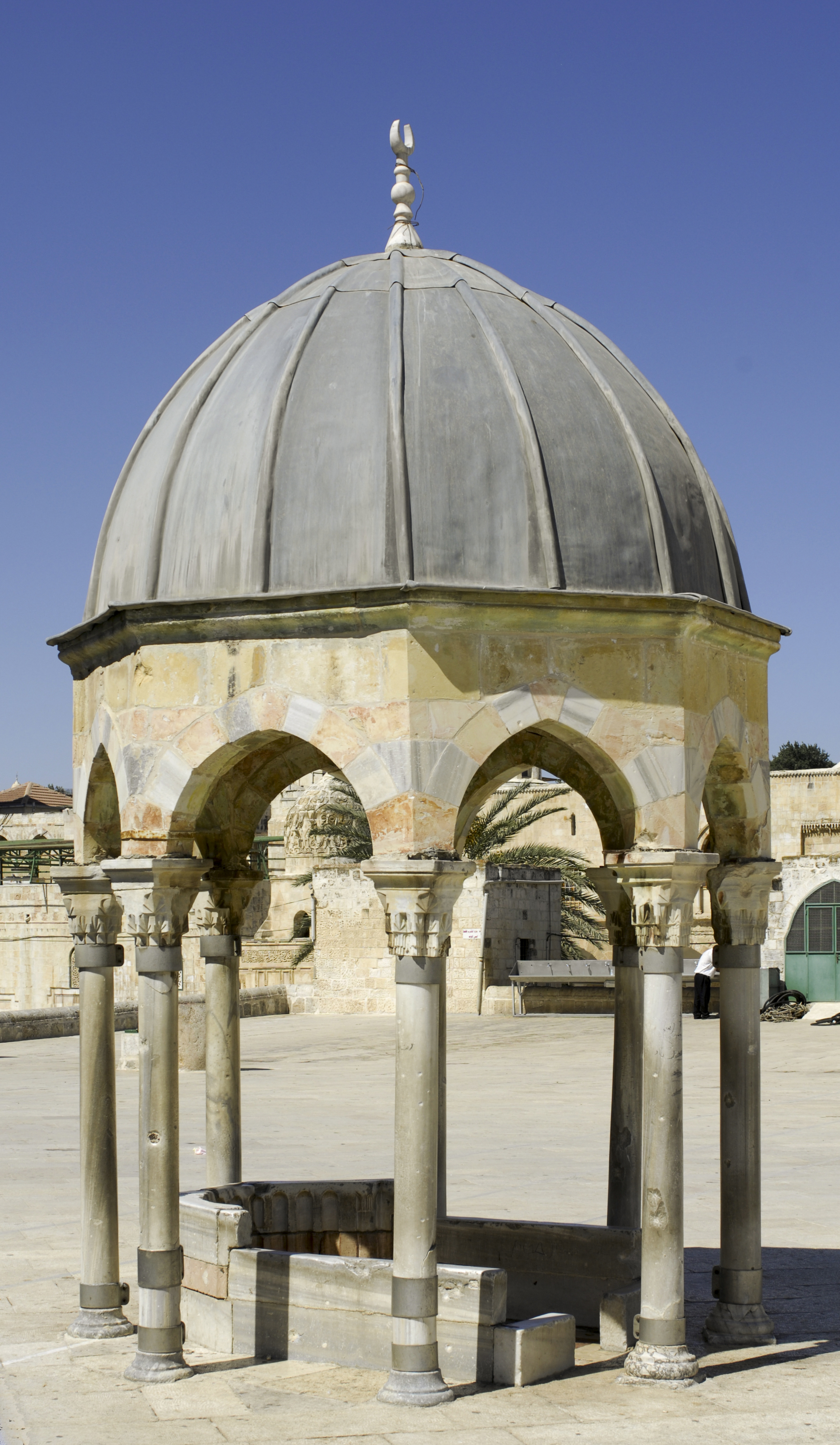
The Dome of the Prophet

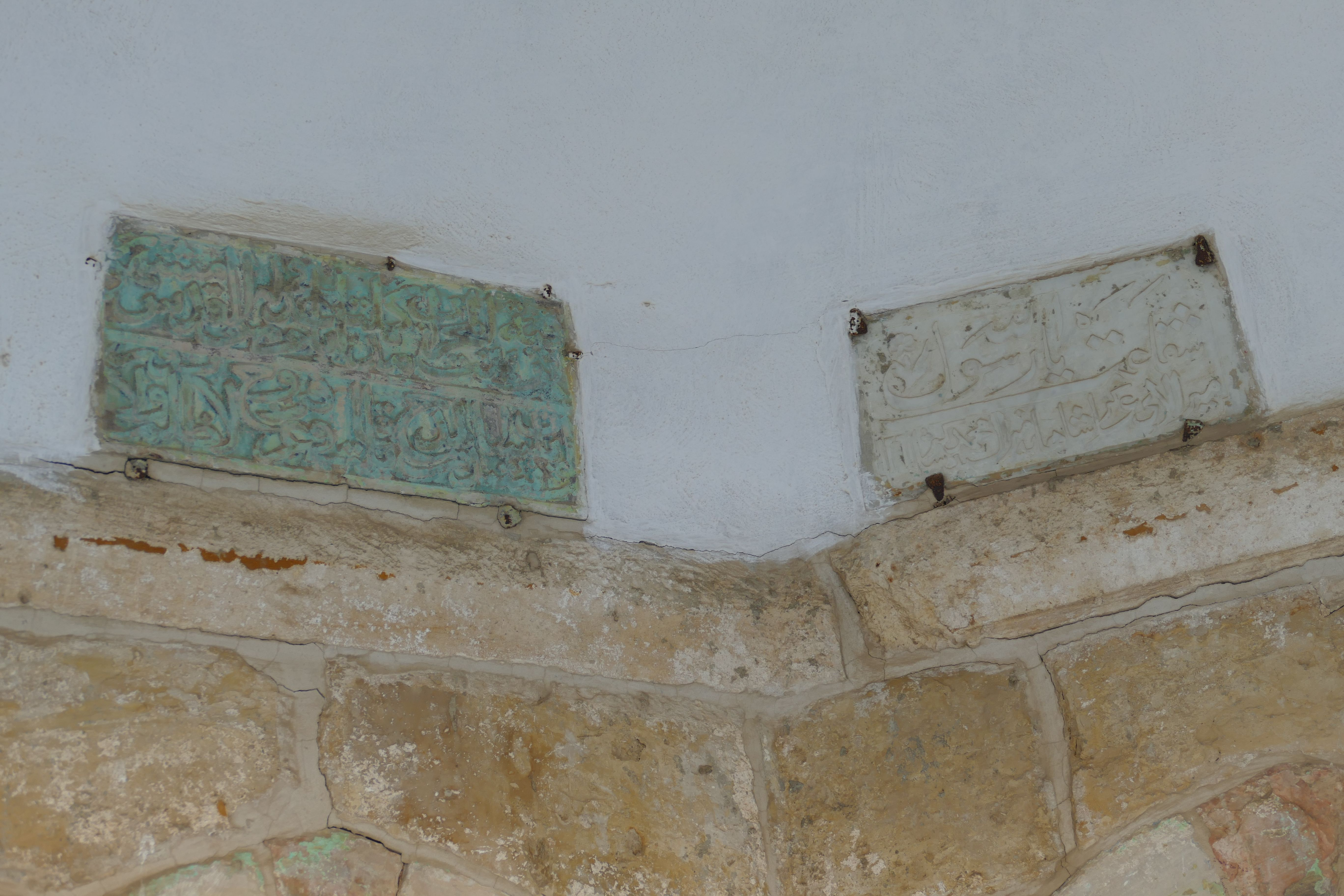
Dedicatory inscription in the Dome of the Prophet mentioning "Farrukh [Pasha]"

Farrukh built a large caravanserai called the Wikala al-Farrukhiyya or Khan al-Farrukhiya for the Hajj pilgrims who assembled in Nablus. According to a description of the building by Turkish traveler Evliya Çelebi, Farrukh's caravanserai was "huge" and "similar to a castle and it has 150 rooms". It became one of Nablus's main commercial properties at least until the mid-19th century.

The historian Yusuf Natsheh credits Farrukh as the restorer of the Dome of the Prophet on the Haram al-Sharif (Temple Mount) in Jerusalem, identifying him as the 'Farrukh' mentioned in the dedicatory inscription on the marble slab inside the dome:

As completed (or perfected), the Dome of the Mihrab seemed beautiful / and chanted in praise, saying "In the reign of Farrukh, the city of Jerusalem witnessed neither oppression nor treachery.

== Bibliography ==
- Abu-Husayn, Abdul-Rahim (1985). Provincial Leaderships in Syria, 1575–1650. Beirut: American University of Beirut. ISBN 9780815660729.
- Doumani, Beshara (1995). Rediscovering Palestine: Merchants and Peasants in Jabal Nablus. University of California Press.
- Natsheh, Yusuf (2000). "Qubbat wa Mihrab al-Nabi (945/1538–9)". In Hillenbrand, Robert; Auld, Sylvia (eds.). Ottoman Jerusalem: The Living City: 1517–1917 Part 1 & 2. London: Council for British Research in the Levant. pp. 701–708. ISBN 1-901435-03-2.
- Tramontana, Felicita (2013). "The Poll Tax and the Decline of the Christian Presence in the Palestinian Countryside in the 17th Century". Journal of the Economic and Social History of the Orient. 56 (4–5): 631–652. doi:10.1163/15685209-12341337.
- Ze'evi, Dror (1996). An Ottoman century: the district of Jerusalem in the 1600s. SUNY Press. ISBN 0-7914-2915-6.
