= Dome of the Prophet =

Islamic building in al-Aqsa, Jerusalem

Coordinates: 31°46′41.30″N 35°14′06.31″E

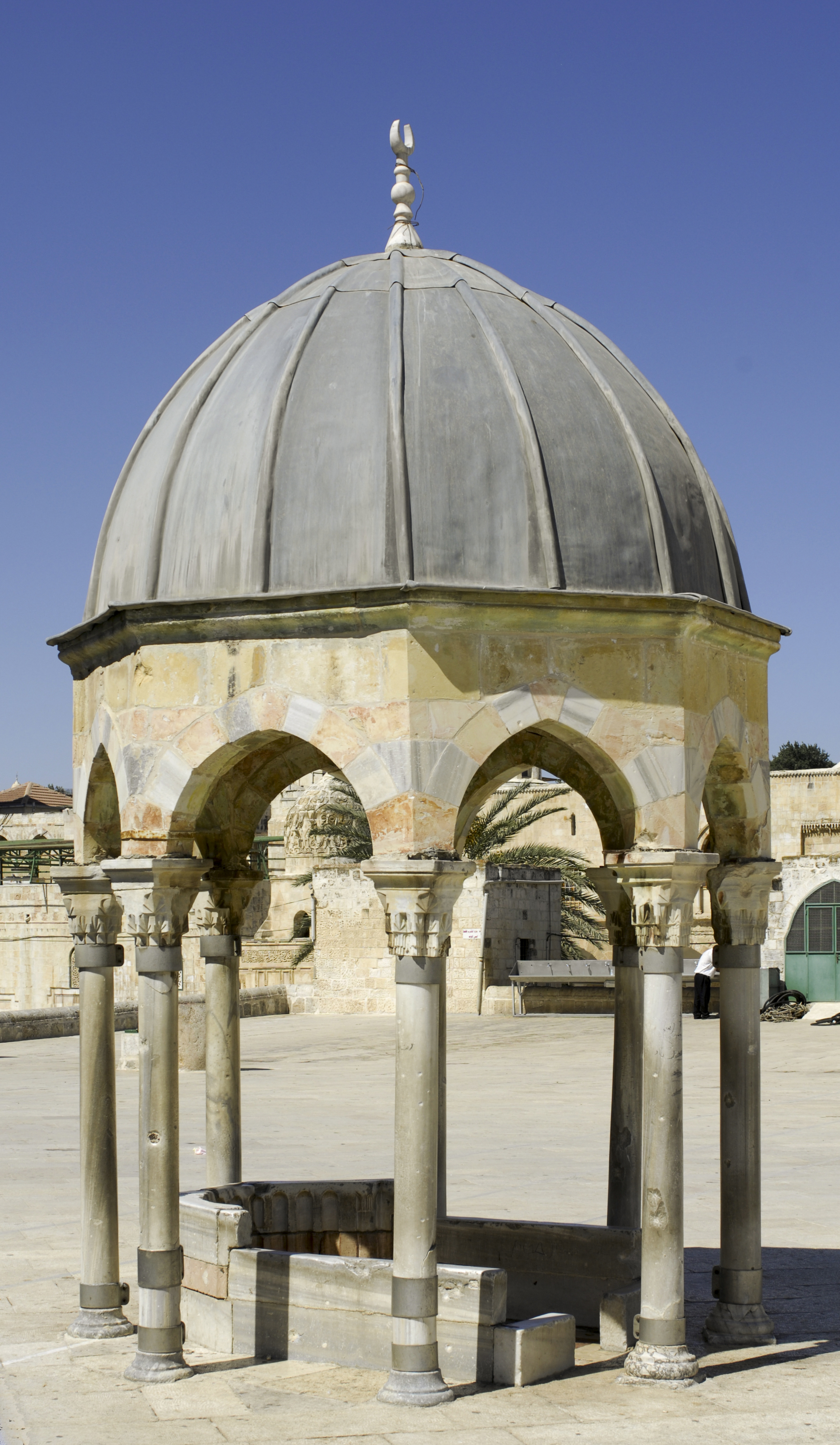
The Dome of the Prophet

The Dome of the Prophet (Arabic: قبة النبي, romanized: Qubbat an-Nabi), also known as the Dome of the Messenger and the Dome of Muhammad (Turkish: Muhammed Kubbesi) is a free-standing dome located on the Al-Aqsa Mosque compound, in Jerusalem. It is located on the northwest part of the terrace where the Dome of the Rock stands and it is near the Dome of the Ascension.

== History ==
Originally built during the Umayyad period (661–750), the dome was subsequently destroyed by the Crusaders (1099–1187). In 1539, the dome was rebuilt by Muhammad Bey, Ottoman governor of Jerusalem during the reign of Sultan Suleiman the Magnificent.

Several Muslim writers, most notably al-Suyuti and al-Wasiti claimed that the site of the dome is where Muhammad led the former prophets and angels in prayer on the night of Isra and Mir'aj before ascending to Heaven. Endowment documents from the Ottoman period indicate that a portion of the endowment of the al-Aqsa Mosque and Haseki Sultan Imaret was dedicated to maintain the lighting of an oil-lamp in the Dome of the Prophet each night.

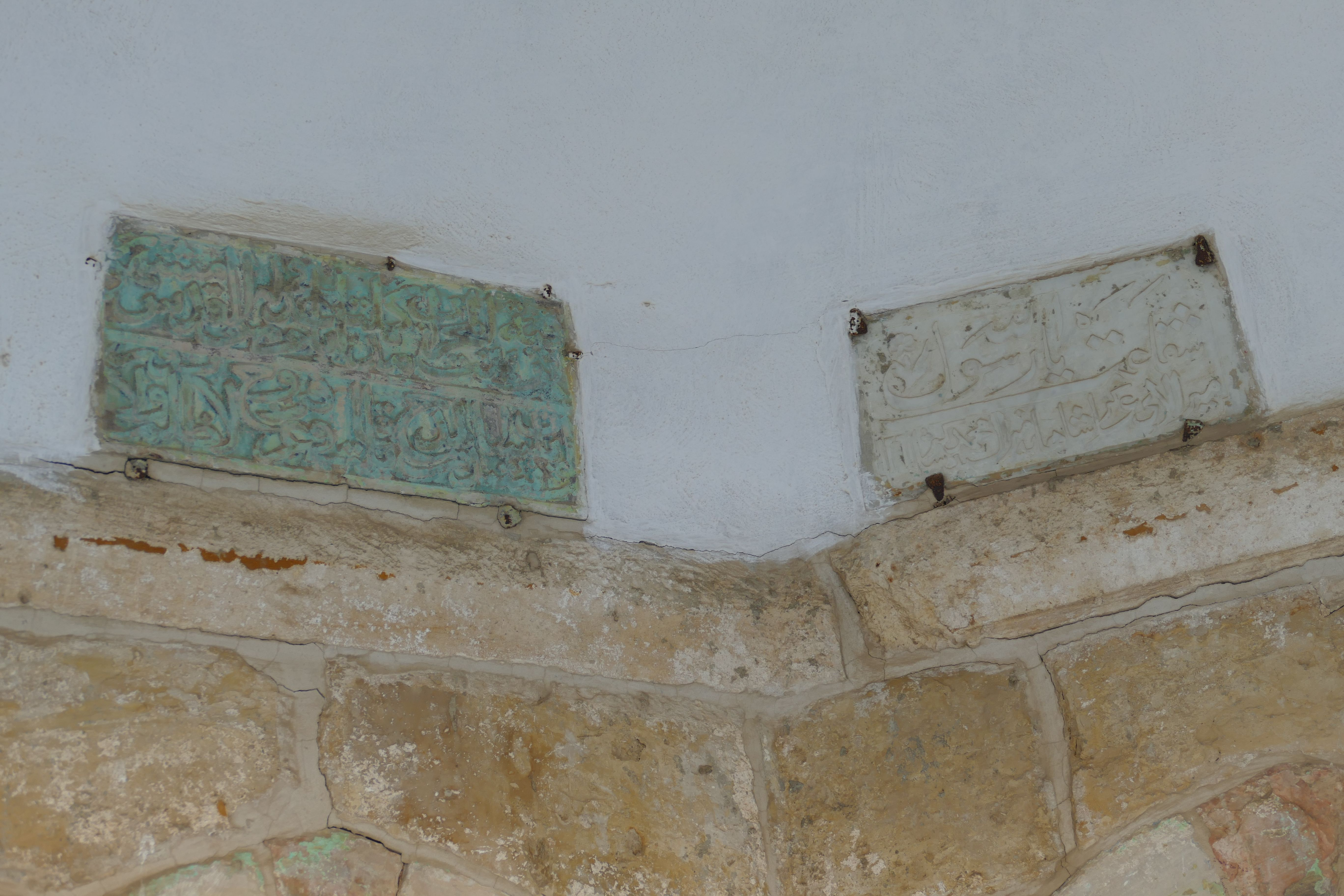
Dedicatory inscription in the Dome of the Prophet mentioning "Farrukh [Pasha]"

The historian Yusuf Natsheh credits Farrukh Pasha, the Ottoman governor of Jerusalem in 1603–1621 (with interruptions), as the restorer of the Dome of the Prophet, identifying him as the 'Farrukh' mentioned in the dedicatory inscription on the marble slab inside the dome:

As completed (or perfected), the Dome of the Mihrab seemed beautiful / and chanted in praise, saying "In the reign of Farrukh, the city of Jerusalem witnessed neither oppression nor treachery.

Its last renovation was in the reign of Sultan Abdul Mejid II.

== Architecture ==
The Dome of the Prophet's octagonal structure is built atop eight gray marble columns. The dome, which is covered with sheet lead and being without walls, is hemispherical and is supported by pointed arches decorated with red, black and white stones. The ancient mihrab is made of a white marble slab embedded in the floor and surrounded by red-colored stones and subsequently delimited by a low wall, that traditionally opened in the north to allow entrance of Muslim believers heading southward to Mecca in Muslim prayers.
