= The Jerusalem Times =

Newspaper

- Type: Weekly newspaper
- Format: Broadsheet
- Owner: BILADI Publishing Co.
- Publisher: Hana Siniora
- Editor: Sami Kamal
- Founded: 1994; 32 years ago
- Headquarters: Jerusalem
- ISSN: 0793-8233
- Website: www.jerusalem-times.net

The Jerusalem Times was a weekly English-language Palestinian newspaper founded by the BILADI Publishing Co. in 1994. The Jerusalem Times also maintained an internet edition, jerusalem-times.net
