= 1969 Al-Aqsa mosque fire =

1969 arson attack in Jerusalem

Coordinates: 31.77624°N 35.235908°E

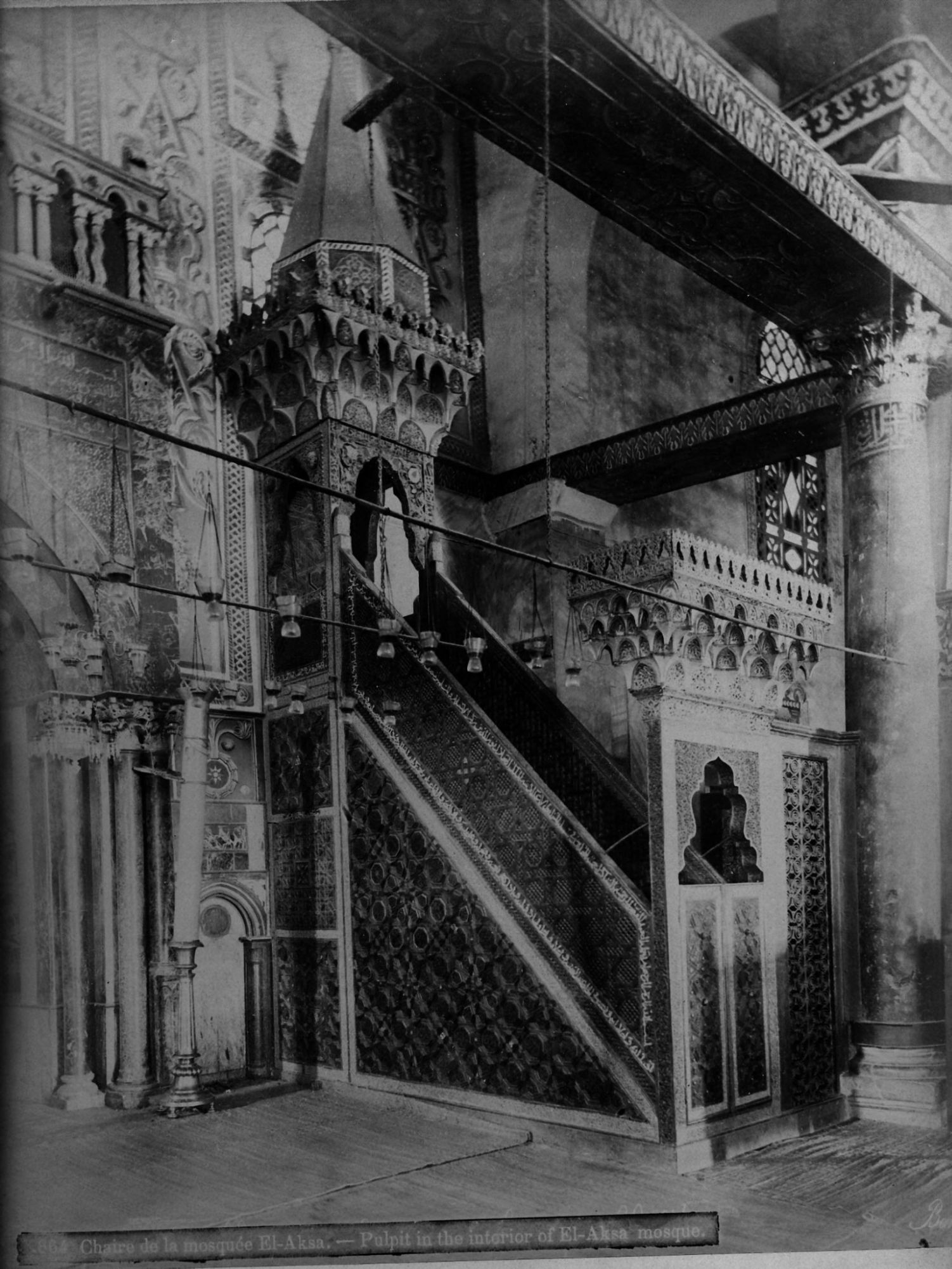
The Minbar of Saladin in the al-Aqsa Mosque, photographed 1900–1910.

The Al-Aqsa mosque fire was an arson attack Al-Aqsa Mosque in Jerusalem, the primary prayer hall within the Al-Aqsa compound, on 21 August 1969. The attack was carried out by Australian citizen Denis Michael Rohan, who initially set fire to the pulpit.

The event has been described as "an act which plunged the Middle East into its worst crisis since the June, 1967, Arab-Israel war", and was a key catalyst for the creation of the Organisation of Islamic Cooperation.

The 12th-century Minbar of Saladin was destroyed in the fire. Initially, Israelis blamed the fire either on an accident related to ongoing renovations, or to a false flag attack by Palestinian group Fatah.

== Events ==
Rohan had been in Jerusalem for almost six months, and frequently visited the area of the Temple Mount / Haram Al-Sharif / Al Aqsa, becoming friendly with the guides and guards of the Jerusalem Islamic Waqf. Rohan first tried to set fire to the mosque 10 days prior, at approximately 11:30 pm on 11 August 1969. Rohan poured kerosene through the keyhole of the south-east gate door, and inserted a kerosene-soaked cord into the keyhole, setting light to the end; however, his attempt failed.

The Israeli report on the event stated that on 21 August 1969, at approximately 6 am, Rohan entered the gate of Bani Ghanim with two containers and a water bottle filled with benzene and kerosene hidden in a haversack. He entered the Jami'a al-Aqsa through the main entrance at about 7 am. He placed the containers of benzene and kerosene below the steps of the minbar of Saladin, soaked a woollen scarf with kerosene placing one end of it upon the steps and the other end on the containers, and set alight the scarf. He left the building immediately after lighting the scarf, but was seen by many witnesses. A Palestinian technical report concluded that there were two separate fires, one in the area of the mihrab and a second in the ceiling of the south eastern part of the mosque.

The fire destroyed much of the southern and the southeastern parts of the mosque, including the 12th-century minbar of Saladin. 400 m^{2} of the southeastern ceiling was badly burnt, as were the ornamental mosaic dome and two marble pillars between the dome and the mihrab. Rohan was arrested for the arson attack on 23 August 1969. He was tried, found to be insane, and hospitalised in a mental institution. On 14 May 1974 he was deported from Israel "on humanitarian grounds, for further psychiatric treatment near his family". He was subsequently transferred to the Callan Park Hospital in Australia. Some sources say that he died in 1995, but an investigation by the Australian Broadcasting Corporation (ABC) in 2009 found that he was still alive then and a few years later he spoke to an ABC journalist.

== Reactions ==
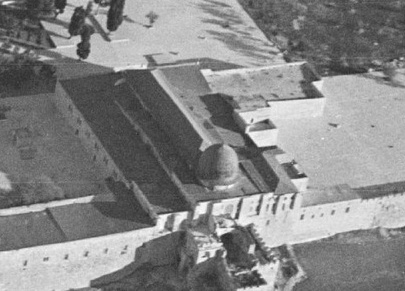
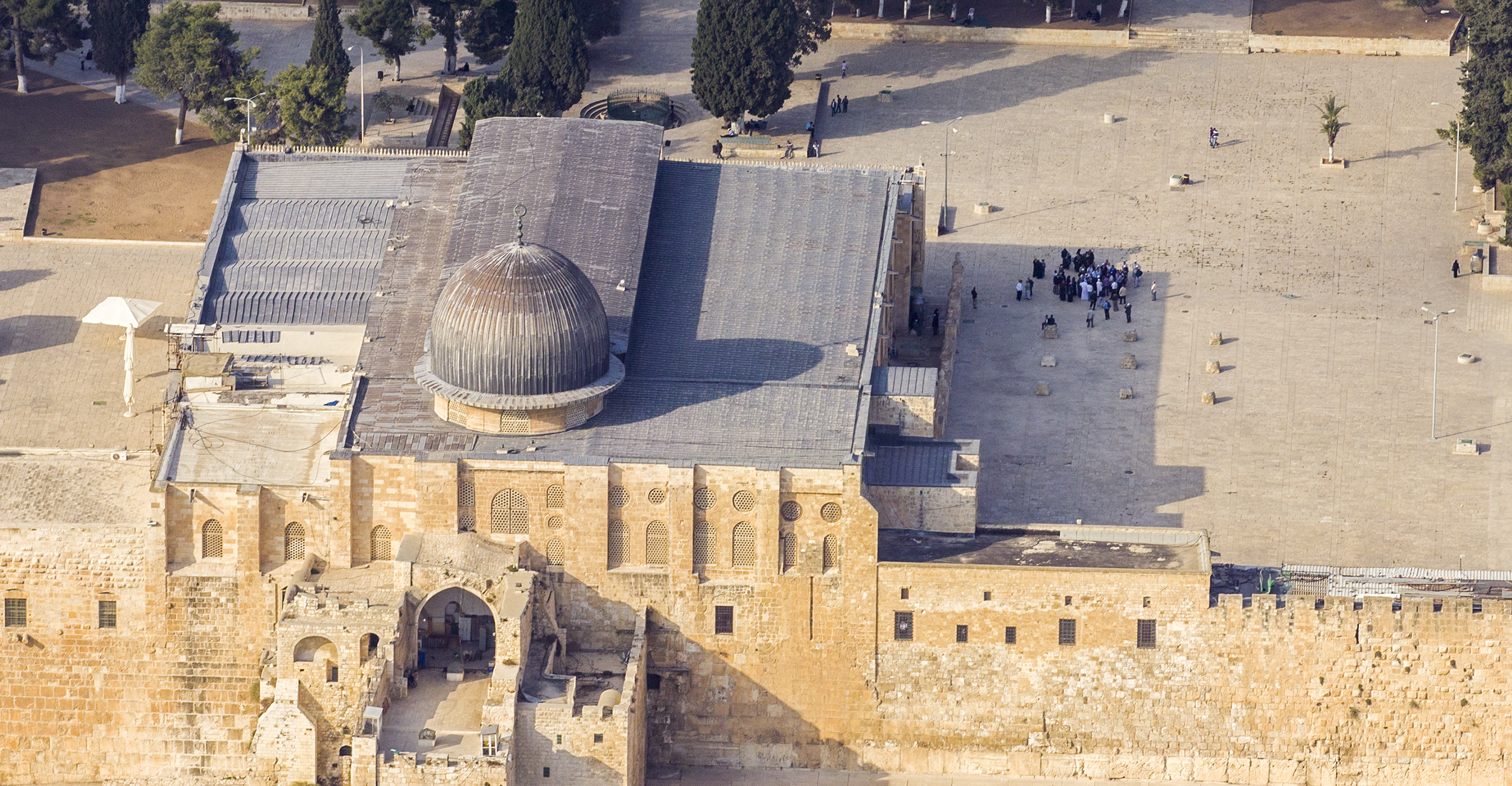
The eastern section of the Qibli Mosque (visible in 1934) before and after it was destroyed following the arson attack in 1969

The fire at Al-Aqsa was the cause of great anger in the Muslim world, and demonstrations and riots occurred as far away as Kashmir. Many Muslims alleged Rohan's actions were part of a wider plot by Israelis, while some Israelis have attacked widely-repeated claims by some Palestinians and other Muslims that Rohan was Jewish, when in fact he was Christian. Palestinian officials have alleged that the arson was carried out with the blessing of Israeli authorities and minimize the culpability of Rohan, while Israeli firefighters at the scene later complained that the hostility directed at them by an assembled crowd of Palestinians, some of whom believed the firefighters were dousing the flames with gasoline instead of water, interfered with their ability to put out the fire.

=== Chief Rabbinate of Israel ===
According to the Jewish Political Studies Review, author Yoel Cohen recorded that the official Israeli Chief Rabbinate adopted a mostly conservative stance toward the capture by Israel of the Temple Mount in 1967, in response to questions about whether to rebuild the Temple and reinstitute the sacrificial service, and whether Jews should be allowed by religious law to ascend the Temple Mount to pray:

Given the uncertainty where the Temple building itself was located, Unterman and Nissim (Israel's chief rabbis at the time) decided to impose a complete ban on the Mount. Zerah Warhaftig, the Religious Affairs Minister, who favored preserving the "status quo", fearing that permission to Jews to pray on the Mount would inflame the Arab world, spoke to the two rabbis about the political dangers.

Cohen further footnoted these remarks with comments from an interview:

Dr Warhaftig said that in 1967–68 he had favored the erection of a small synagogue in the area of El Aqsa, but once he saw the violent reactions after the Michael Rohan arson at El Aqsa in 1968, he concluded that such a step would not be possible. "Had it just been a matter of the Palestinians," Warhaftig said, he would have favored prayer facilities for those Jews who insisted on such prayer rights, even though it transgressed the decisions of the chief rabbis. But once he saw the emotional strength of feelings throughout the Moslem world, he did not pursue this idea.

=== U.N. complaint and resolution ===
On 28 August 1969 a complaint was submitted to the United Nations Security Council by twenty-five Muslim countries in response to the Al Aqsa arson attempt. Speaking to the council, Mohammad El-Farra of Jordan stated:

Today, my delegation joins the 24 other members, representing 750 million adherents of the Moslem faith, which requested a meeting to consider another, more serious tragedy, namely of Al Aqsa Mosque, and the fire which severely damaged that historic Holy Place on the morning of 21 August 1969. ... The Israeli authorities introduced more than one explanation for the start of the fire and at last charged an Australian with the arson. According to news that originated from Israel sources, the Australian suspect is a friend of Israel who was brought by the Jewish Agency to work for Israel. ... The report published in The Jerusalem Post ... casts doubt on the case and adds to the fears and worries of the Moslems about their holy shrines; it also throws light on who is the criminal and who is the accomplice.

On 15 September 1969, the Security Council passed a resolution condemning Israel by 11 votes to none with 4 abstentions. Resolution 271 recalled previous resolutions regarding the Geneva Conventions, international law on military occupation and the status of Jerusalem. It "[d]etermines that the execrable act of desecration and profanation of the Holy Al Aqsa Mosque emphasizes the immediate necessity of Israel's desisting from acting in violation of the aforesaid resolutions". Furthermore, it "[c]ondemns the failure of Israel to comply with the aforementioned resolutions" and calls on Israel to refrain from hindering the operation of the Supreme Muslim Council.

=== Yassir Arafat, by and on his behalf ===
Yassir Arafat later developed a regular television interview speech in which he would refer back to this act of attempted arson, while avoiding mention of Rohan by name.

The Palestinian newspaper, La Presse Palestinienne, reported the following:

During an assembly commemorating the 1969 arson attempt on the Al-Aqsa Mosque, Zakaria al-Agha, a member of the PA Executive Council, made a speech on Arafat's behalf, stressing the determination of the Palestinian people to continue along the path of Jihad until the occupation ends.
