= Al-Aqsa Mosque =

Congregation mosque in Jerusalem

- جامع الأقصى (Jāmiʿ al-Aqṣā) المصلى القبلي (al-Muṣallā al-Qiblī)
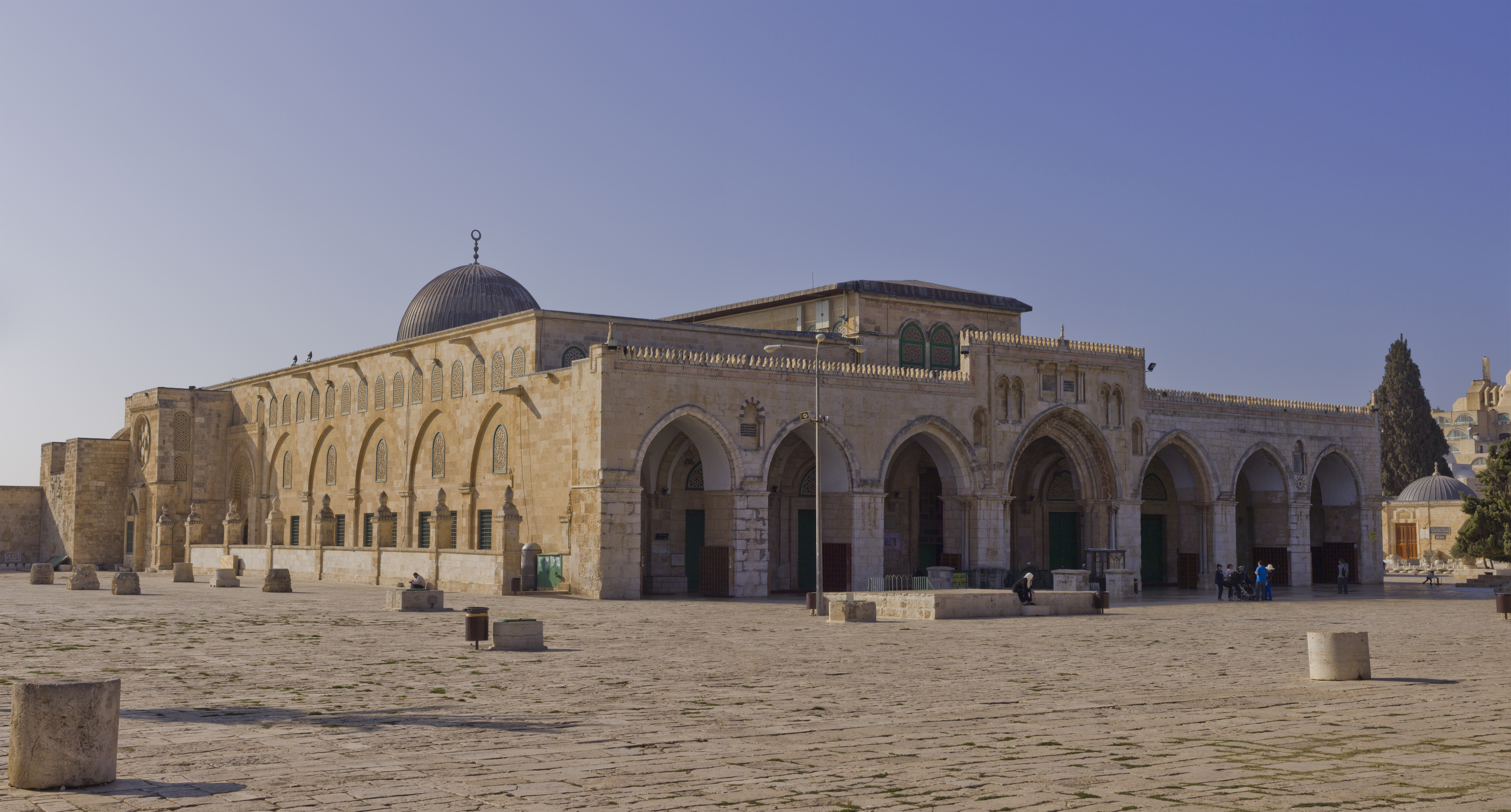

- Location within the Old City of Jerusalem Location within Jerusalem

Religion
- Affiliation: Islam
- Leadership: Muhammad Ahmad Hussein (Grand Mufti of Jerusalem)

Location
- Location: Old City of Jerusalem (East Jerusalem)
- Administration: Jerusalem Islamic Waqf
- Coordinates: 31°46′34″N 35°14′09″E

Architecture
- Type: Mosque
- Style: Early Islamic
- Established: 7th–8th centuries

Specifications
- Direction of façade: North–northwest
- Capacity: 5,000+
- Materials: Limestone (external walls, façade), lead and concrete (dome), white marble (interior columns) and mosaic

The Aqsa Mosque, (Note: Arabic: جامع الأقصى, romanized: Jāmiʿ al-Aqṣā, lit. 'congregational mosque of Al-Aqsa') also known as the Qibli Mosque, (Note: المصلى القبلي, al-muṣallā al-qiblī, lit. 'prayer hall of the qibla (south)') is the main congregational mosque or prayer hall in the Al-Aqsa mosque compound in the Old City of Jerusalem. In some sources the building is also named al-Masjid al-Aqṣā, but this name primarily applies to the wider compound in which the building sits, which is itself also known as 'al-Aqsa Mosque', 'al-Aqsa' or 'Haram al-Sharif'.

According to Islamic tradition, a small prayer hall (musalla), what would later become the al-Aqsa Mosque, was built by Umar (r. 634–644), the second caliph of the Rashidun Caliphate. In the reign of Umayyad caliph Mu'awiya I (r. 661–680), a quadrangular mosque with capacity for 3,000 worshipers is recorded on the compound. The current mosque, located on the south wall of the compound, was originally built by the fifth Umayyad caliph Abd al-Malik (r. 685–705) or his successor al-Walid I (r. 705–715) (or both) as a congregational mosque on the same axis as the Dome of the Rock, a commemorative Islamic monument. After being destroyed in an earthquake in 746, the mosque was rebuilt in 758 by the Abbasid caliph al-Mansur. It was further expanded upon in 780 by the Abbasid caliph al-Mahdi, after which it consisted of fifteen aisles and a central dome. It was destroyed again during an earthquake in 1033. The mosque was rebuilt by the Fatimid caliph al-Zahir (r. 1021–1036), who reduced it to seven aisles but adorned its interior with an elaborate central archway covered in vegetal mosaics; the current structure preserves the 11th-century outline.

During the periodic renovations, the ruling Islamic dynasties constructed additions to the mosque and its precincts, such as its dome, façade, minarets, and minbar and interior structure. Upon its capture by the Crusaders in 1099, the mosque was used as a palace; it was also the headquarters of the religious order of the Knights Templar. After the area was conquered by Saladin in 1187, the structure's function as a mosque was restored. More renovations, repairs, and expansion projects were undertaken in later centuries by the Ayyubids, the Mamluks, the Ottomans, the Supreme Muslim Council of British Palestine, and during the Jordanian rule of the West Bank. Since the beginning of the ongoing Israeli occupation of the West Bank, the mosque has remained under the independent administration of the Jerusalem Islamic Waqf.

== Definition ==
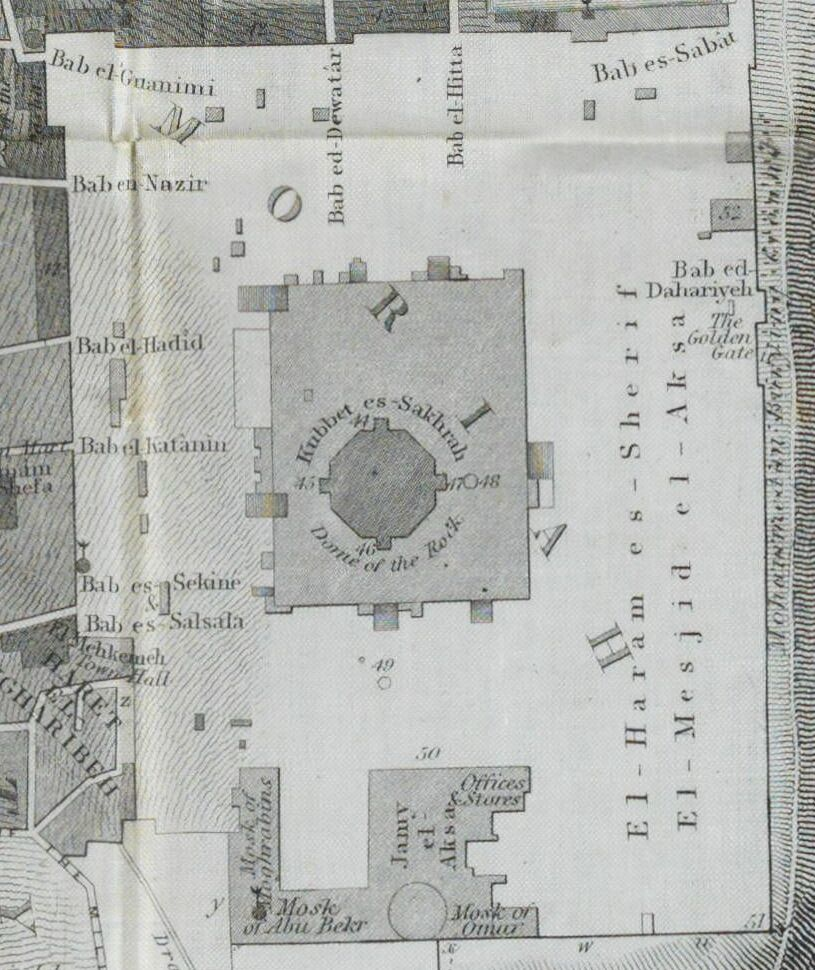
Extract of an 1841 British map showing both "Mesjid el-Aksa" and "Jami el-Aksa"

The English term "Al-Aqsa Mosque" is the translation of two distinct Arabic terms: al-Masjid al-Aqṣā and Jāmiʿ al-Aqṣā. (Note: Edward Robinson: The Jámi'a el-Aksa is the mosk alone; the Mesjid el-Aksa is the mosk with all the sacred enclosure and precincts, including the Sükhrah. Thus the words Mesjid and Jāmi'a differ in usage somewhat like the Greek ίερόν and ναός. Edward Henry Palmer: Excursus on the Name Masjid el Aksa. In order to understand the native accounts of the sacred area at Jerusalem, it is essentially necessary to keep in mind the proper application of the various names by which it is spoken of. When the Masjid el Aksa is mentioned, that name is usually supposed to refer to the well-known mosque on the south side of the Haram, but such is not really the case. The latter building is called El Jámʻi el Aksa, or simply El Aksa, and the substructures are called El Aksa el Kadímeh (the ancient Aksa), while the title El Masjid el Aksa is applied to the whole sanctuary. The word Jámi is exactly equivalent in sense to the Greek συναγωγή, and is applied to the church or building in which the worshippers congregate. Masjid, on the other hand, is a much more general term; it is derived from the verb sejada "to adore," and is applied to any spot, the sacred character of which would especially incite the visitor to an act of devotion. Our word mosque is a corruption of masjid, but it is usually misapplied, as the building is never so designated, although the whole area on which it stands may be so spoken of. The Cubbet es Sakhrah, El Aksa, Jam'i el Magharibeh, &c., are each called a Jami, but the entire Haram is a masjid. This will explain how it is that 'Omar, after visiting the churches of the Anastasis, Sion, &c., was taken to the "Masjid" of Jerusalem, and will account for the statement of Ibn el 'Asa'kir and others, that the Masjid el Aksa measured over 600 cubits in length-that is, the length of the whole Haram area. The name Masjid el Aksa is borrowed from the passage in the Coran (xvii. 1), when allusion is made to the pretended ascent of Mohammed into heaven from ·the temple of Jerusalem; "Praise be unto Him who transported His servant by night from El Masjid el Haram (i.e., 'the Sacred place of Adoration' at Mecca) to El Masjid el Aksa (i.e., 'the Remote place of Adoration' at Jerusalem), the precincts of which we have blessed," &c. The title El Aksa, "the Remote," according to the Mohammedan doctors, is applied to the temple of Jerusalem "either because of its distance from Mecca, or because it is in the centre of the earth.) The former name (al-Masjid al-Aqṣā, "the furthest mosque") was first used in the Quran's Surah 17, where it referred to the whole compound of Al Aqsa, or Haram al-Sharif – there were no buildings on the site at the time the Quran was written. The latter name (Jāmiʿ al-Aqṣā) is used for the subject of this article – the silver-domed congregational mosque building. Arabic and Persian writers such as 10th-century geographer al-Muqaddasi, (Note: Guy le Strange on al-Muqaddasi's and Nasir-i-Khusraw's descriptions of the Aqsa mosque compound: Great confusion is introduced into the Arab descriptions of the Noble Sanctuary by the indiscriminate use of the terms Al Masjid or Al Masjid al Akså, Jami' or Jami al Aksâ; and nothing but an intimate acquaintance with the locality described will prevent a translator, ever and again, misunderstanding the text he has before him-since the native authorities use the technical terms in an extraordinarily inexact manner, often confounding the whole, and its part, under the single denomination of "Masjid." Further, the usage of various writers differs considerably on these points : Mukaddasi invariably speaks of the whole Haram Area as Al Masjid, or as Al Masjid al Aksî, "the Akså Mosque," or "the mosque," while the Main-building of the mosque, at the south end of the Haram Area, which we generally term the Aksa, he refers to as Al Mughattâ, "the Covered-part." Thus he writes "the mosque is entered by thirteen gates," meaning the gates of the Haram Area. So also "on the right of the court," means along the west wall of the Haram Area; "on the left side" means the east wall; and "at the back" denotes the northern boundary wall of the Haram Area. Nasir-i-Khusrau, who wrote in Persian, uses for the Main-building of the Aksâ Mosque the Persian word Pushish, that is, "Covered part," which exactly translates the Arabic Al Mughatta. On some occasions, however, the Akså Mosque (as we call it) is spoken of by Näsir as the Maksurah, a term used especially to denote the railed-off oratory of the Sultan, facing the Mihrâb, and hence in an extended sense applied to the building which includes the same. The great Court of the Haram Area, Nâsir always speaks of as the Masjid, or the Masjid al Akså, or again as the Friday Mosque (Masjid-i-Jum'ah).) 11th-century scholar Nasir Khusraw, 12th-century geographer al-Idrisi and 15th-century Islamic scholar Mujir al-Din, as well as 19th-century American and British Orientalists Edward Robinson, Guy Le Strange, (Note: Guy le Strange: The great mosque of Jerusalem, Al Masjid al Aksà, the "Further Mosque," derives its name from the traditional Night Journey of Muhammad, to which allusion is made in the words of the Kuran (xvii. I)... the term "Mosque" being here taken to denote the whole area of the Noble Sanctuary, and not the Main-building of the Aksà only, which, in the Prophet's days, did not exist. The term Masjid (whence, through the Spanish Mezquita, our word Mosque) denotes the whole of the sacred edifice, comprising the main building and the court, with its lateral arcades and minor chapels. The earliest specimen of the Arab mosque consisted of an open courtyard, within which, round its four walls, run colonades or cloisters to give shelter to the worshippers. On the side of the court towards the Kiblah (in the direction of Mekka), and facing which the worshipper must stand, the colonade, instead of being single, is, for the convenience of the increased numbers of the congregation, widened out to form the Jami' or place of assembly... coming now to the Noble Sanctuary at Jerusalem, we must remember that the term 'Masjid' belongs not only to the Aksa mosque (more properly the Jami' or place of assembly for prayer), but to the whole enclosure with the Dome of the Rock in the middle, and all the other minor domes and chapels.) and Edward Henry Palmer explained that the term Masjid al-Aqsa refers to the entire esplanade plaza also known as the Temple Mount or Haram al-Sharif ('Noble Sanctuary') – i.e. the entire area including the Dome of the Rock, the fountains, the gates, and the four minarets – because none of these buildings existed at the time the Quran was written. Al-Muqaddasi referred to the southern building (the subject of this article) as Al Mughattâ ("the covered-part") and Nasir Khusraw referred to it with the Persian word Pushish (also the "covered part", exactly as "Al Mughatta") or the Maqsurah (a part-for-the-whole synecdoche).

The building is also referred to as (al-)Qibli Mosque or (al-)Qibli Chapel (Muṣallā al-Qiblī), in reference to its location on the southern end of the compound as a result of the Islamic qibla being moved from Jerusalem to Mecca. "Qibli" is the name used in official publications by the governmental organization which administers the site, the Jerusalem Islamic Waqf (part of the Jordanian government), and the Jordanian government more widely. It is also the official name used by the Palestine Liberation Organization. It has been used by numerous international organizations such as the United States State Department the Organisation of Islamic Cooperation (whose role is to act as "the collective voice of the Muslim world"), and UNESCO, as well as various scholars and media organizations.

== History ==
=== Pre-construction ===
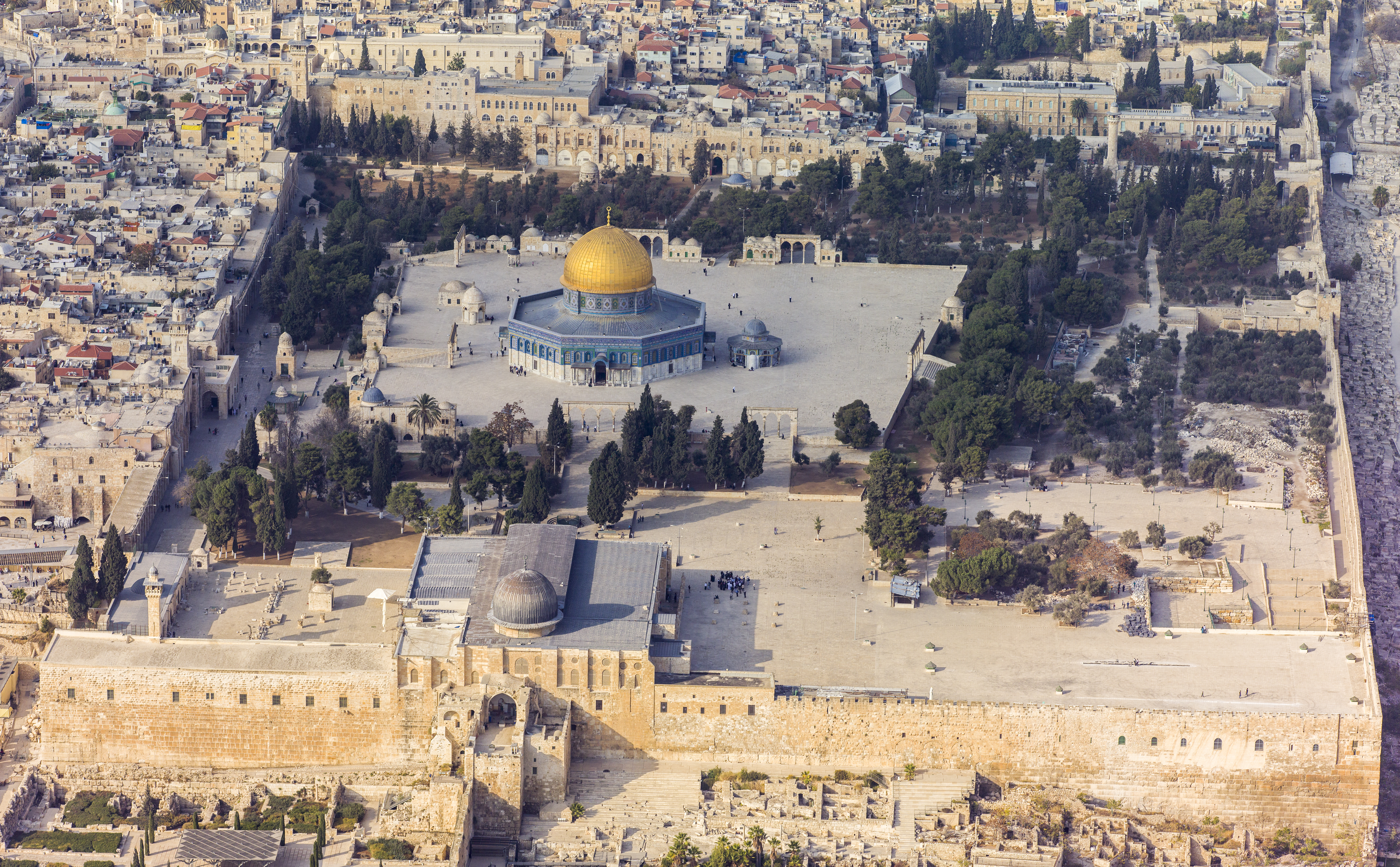
The mosque is situated at the Southern end of al-Masjid al-Aqsa (al-Haram al-Sharif)

The mosque is located on the southern part of the Temple Mount or Haram al-Sharif, an enclosure expanded by King Herod the Great beginning in 20 BCE during his reconstruction of the Second Jewish Temple. The mosque resides on an artificial platform that is supported by arches constructed by Herod's engineers to overcome the difficult topographic conditions resulting from the southward expansion of the enclosure into the Tyropoeon and Kidron valleys. During the late Second Temple period, the present site of the mosque was occupied by the Royal Stoa, a basilica running the southern wall of the enclosure. The Royal Stoa was destroyed along with the Temple during the siege of Jerusalem by the Romans in 70 CE.

It was once thought that Emperor Justinian's "Nea Ekklesia of the Theotokos", lit. 'the New Church of the God-Bearer' and commonly known as the Nea Church, dedicated to the God-bearing Virgin Mary, consecrated in 543, was situated where al-Aqsa Mosque was later constructed. However, remains identified as those of the Nea Church were uncovered in the south part of the Jewish Quarter in 1973.

Analysis of the wooden beams and panels removed from the mosque during renovations in the 1930s shows they are made from Lebanese cedar and cypress. Radiocarbon dating gave a large range of ages, some as old as the 9th century BCE, showing that some of the wood had previously been used in older buildings. However, reexamination of the same beams in the 2010s gave dates in the Byzantine period.

During his excavations in the 1930s, Robert Hamilton uncovered portions of a multicolor mosaic floor with geometric patterns, but did not publish them. The date of the mosaic is disputed: Zachi Dvira considers that they are from the pre-Islamic Byzantine period, while Baruch, Reich and Sandhaus favor a much later Umayyad origin on account of their similarity to a mosaic from an Umayyad palace excavated adjacent to the Temple Mount's southern wall. By comparing the photographs to Hamilton's excavation report, Di Cesare determined that they belong to the second phase of mosque construction in the Umayyad period. Moreover, the mosaic designs were common in Islamic, Jewish and Christian buildings from the 2nd to the 8th century. Di Cesare suggested that Hamilton didn't include the mosaics in his book because they were destroyed to explore beneath them.

=== Umayyad period ===
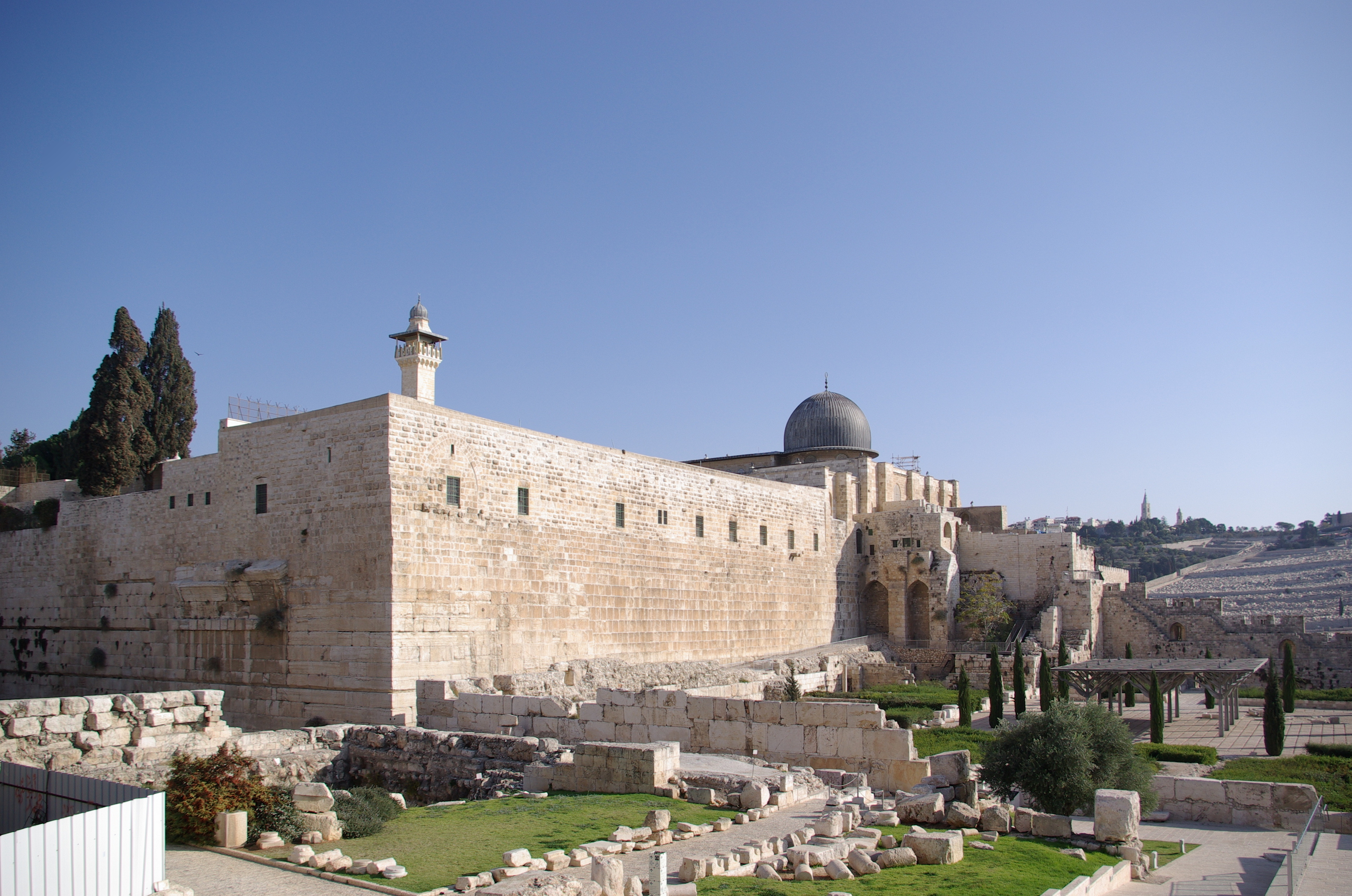
The mosque along the southern wall of al-Masjid al-Aqsa (al-Haram al-Sharif)

A mostly wooden, rectangular mosque on the Temple Mount site with a capacity for 3,000 worshippers is attested by the Gallic monk Arculf during his pilgrimage to Jerusalem in c. 679–682. Its precise location is not known. The art historian Oleg Grabar deems it likely that it was close to the present mosque, while the historian Yildirim Yavuz asserts it stood at the present site of the Dome of Rock. The architectural historian K. A. C. Creswell notes that Arculf's attestation lends credibility to claims by some Islamic traditions and medieval Christian chronicles, which he otherwise deems legendary or unreliable, that the second Rashidun caliph, Umar (r. 634–644), ordered the construction of a primitive mosque on the Temple Mount. However, Arculf visited Palestine during the reign of Caliph Mu'awiya I (r. 661–680), founder of the Syria-based Umayyad Caliphate. Mu'awiya had been governor of Syria, including Palestine, for about twenty years before becoming caliph and his accession ceremony was held in Jerusalem. The 10th-century Jerusalemite scholar Ibn Tahir claims Mu'awiya built a mosque on the Haram.

There is disagreement as to whether the present al-Aqsa Mosque was originally built by the Umayyad caliph Abd al-Malik (r. 685–705) or his successor, his son al-Walid I (r. 705–715). Several architectural historians hold that Abd al-Malik commissioned the project and that al-Walid finished or expanded it. (Note: K. A. C. Creswell, the archaeologists Robert Hamilton and Henri Stern, and the historian F. E. Peters attribute the original Umayyad construction to al-Walid. Other architectural historians, Julian Rabi, Jere Bacharach, and Yildirim Yavuz, as well as the scholars H. I. Bell, Rafi Grafman and Myriam Rosen-Ayalon, and Amikam Elad, assert or suggest that Abd al-Malik started the project and al-Walid finished or expanded it.) Abd al-Malik inaugurated great architectural works on the Temple Mount, including construction of the Dome of the Rock in c. 691. A common Islamic tradition holds that Abd al-Malik simultaneously commissioned the Dome of the Rock and the al-Aqsa Mosque. As both were intentionally built on the same axis, Grabar comments that the two structures form "part of an architecturally thought-out ensemble comprising a congregational and a commemorative building", the al-Aqsa Mosque and the Dome of the Rock, respectively. (Note: This tradition is detailed in the work of the 15th-century Jerusalemite historian Mujir al-Din, the 15th-century historian al-Suyuti and the 11th-century Jerusalemite writers al-Wasiti and Ibn al-Murajja. The tradition cites an isnad (chain of transmission) traced to Thabit, a mid-8th-century attendant of the sanctuary complex, who transmits on the authority of Raja ibn Haywa, Abd al-Malik's court theologian who supervised the financing of the Dome of the Rock's construction.) Guy le Strange claims that Abd al-Malik used materials from the destroyed Church of Our Lady to build the mosque and points to possible evidence that substructures on the southeast corners of the mosque are remains of the church.

The earliest source indicating al-Walid's work on the mosque is the Aphrodito Papryi. These contain the letters between al-Walid's governor of Egypt in December 708–June 711 and a government official in Upper Egypt which discuss the dispatch of Egyptian laborers and craftsmen to help build the al-Aqsa Mosque, referred to as the "Mosque of Jerusalem". The referenced workers spent between six months and a year on the construction. Several 10th and 13th-century historians credit al-Walid for founding the mosque, though the historian Amikam Elad doubts their reliability on the matter. (Note: The 10th-century historians Eutychius of Alexandria and al-Muhallabi attribute the mosque's construction to al-Walid, though they also erroneously credit him for the Dome of the Rock's construction. Other inaccuracies in their works make Elad question their reliability on the matter. A number of 13th-century historians, including Ibn al-Athir, support the claim, but Elad points out that they copy directly from the 10th-century historian al-Tabari, whose work only mentions al-Walid building the great mosques of Damascus and Medina, with the 13th-century historians adding the al-Aqsa Mosque to his roster of great building works. Traditions by sources based in nearby Ramla in the mid-8th century similarly credit al-Walid for the mosques in Damascus and Medina, but limit his role in Jerusalem to providing food for the city's Quran reciters.) In 713–714, a series of earthquakes ravaged Jerusalem, destroying the eastern section of the mosque, which was subsequently rebuilt by al-Walid's order. He had gold from the Dome of the Rock melted to use as money to finance the repairs and renovations. He is credited by the early 15th-century historian al-Qalqashandi for covering the mosque's walls with mosaics. Grabar notes that the Umayyad-era mosque was adorned with mosaics, marble, and "remarkable crafted and painted woodwork". The latter are preserved partly in the Palestine Archaeological Museum and partly in the Islamic Museum.

Estimates of the size of the Umayyad-built mosque by architectural historians range from 112 by 39 meters (367 ft × 128 ft) to 114.6 by 69.2 meters (376 ft × 227 ft). The building was rectangular. In the assessment of Grabar, the layout was a modified version of the traditional hypostyle mosque of the period. Its "unusual" characteristic was that its aisles laid perpendicular to the qibla wall. The number of aisles is not definitively known, though fifteen is cited by a number of historians. The central aisle, double the width of the others, was probably topped by a dome.

The last years of Umayyad rule were turbulent for Jerusalem. The last Umayyad caliph, Marwan II (r. 744–750), punished Jerusalem's inhabitants for supporting a rebellion against him by rival princes, and tore down the city's walls. In 746, the al-Aqsa Mosque was ruined in an earthquake. Four years later, the Umayyads were toppled and replaced by the Iraq-based Abbasid Caliphate.

=== Abbasid period ===
The Abbasids generally exhibited little interest in Jerusalem, though the historian Shelomo Dov Goitein notes they "paid special tribute" to the city during the early part of their rule, and Grabar asserts that the early Abbasids' work on the mosque suggests "a major attempt to assert Abbasid sponsorship of holy places". Nevertheless, in contrast to the Umayyad period, maintenance of the al-Aqsa Mosque during Abbasid rule often came at the initiative of the local Muslim community, rather than from the caliph. The second Abbasid caliph, al-Mansur (r. 754–775), visited Jerusalem in 758, on his return from the Hajj pilgrimage to Mecca. He found the structures on the Haram in ruins from the 746 earthquake, including the al-Aqsa Mosque. According to the tradition cited by Mujir al-Din, the caliph was beseeched by the city's Muslim residents to fund the buildings' restoration. In response, he had the gold and silver plaques covering the mosque's doors converted into dinars and dirhams to finance the reconstruction.

A second earthquake damaged most of al-Mansur's repairs, except for the southern portion near the mihrab (prayer niche indicating the qibla). In 780, his successor, al-Mahdi, ordered its reconstruction, mandating that his provincial governors and other commanders each contribute the cost of a colonnade. Al-Mahdi's renovation is the first known to have written records describing it. The Jerusalemite geographer al-Muqaddasi, writing in 985, provided the following description:

This mosque is even more beautiful than that of Damascus ... the edifice [after al-Mahdi's reconstruction] rose firmer and more substantial than ever it had been in former times. The more ancient portion remained, even like a beauty spot, in the midst of the new ... the Aqsa mosque has twenty-six doors ... The centre of the Main-building is covered by a mighty roof, high pitched and gable-wise, over which rises a magnificent dome.

Al-Muqaddasi further noted that the mosque consisted of fifteen aisles aligned perpendicularly to the qibla and possessed an elaborately decorated porch with the names of the Abbasid caliphs inscribed on its gates. According to Hamilton, al-Muqaddasi's description of the Abbasid-era mosque is corroborated by his archaeological findings in 1938–1942, which showed the Abbasid construction retained some parts of the older structure and had a broad central aisle topped by a dome. The mosque described by al-Muqaddasi opened to the north, toward the Dome of the Rock, and, unusually according to Grabar, to the east.

Other than al-Mansur and al-Mahdi, no other Abbasid caliphs visited Jerusalem or commissioned work on the al-Aqsa Mosque, though Caliph al-Ma'mun (r. 813–833) ordered significant work elsewhere on the Haram. He also contributed a bronze portal to the mosque's interior, and the geographer Nasir Khusraw noted during his 1047 visit that al-Ma'mun's name was inscribed on it. Abd Allah ibn Tahir, the Abbasid governor of the eastern province of Khurasan (r. 828–844), is credited by al-Muqaddasi for building a colonnade on marble pillars in front of the fifteen doors on the mosque's front (north) side.

=== Fatimid period ===
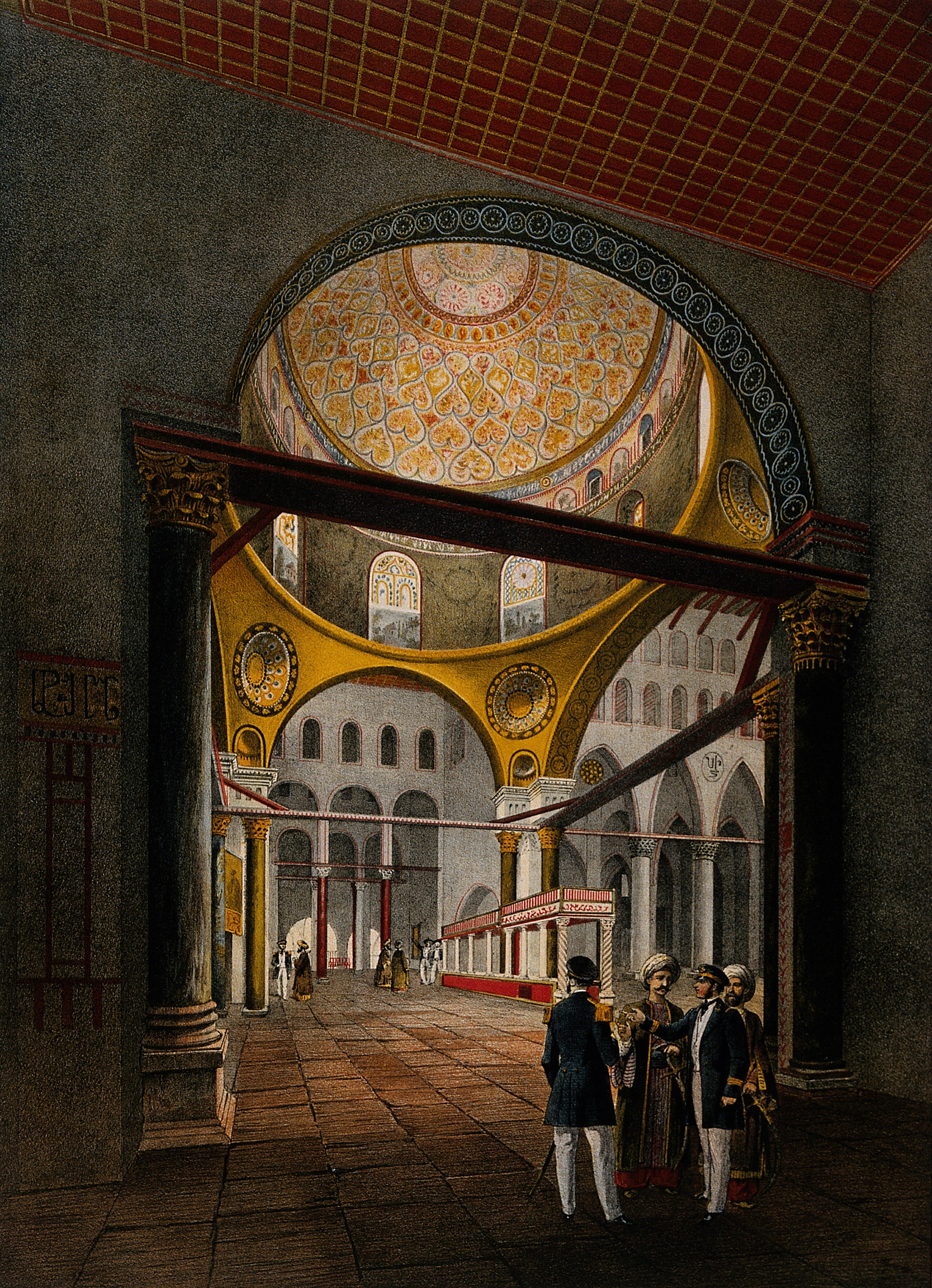
A 19th-century chromolithograph of the mosque's interior. The mosaic designs on the drum of the dome, the pendentives, and the archway in front of the mihrab date from the mid-11th-century Fatimid reconstruction

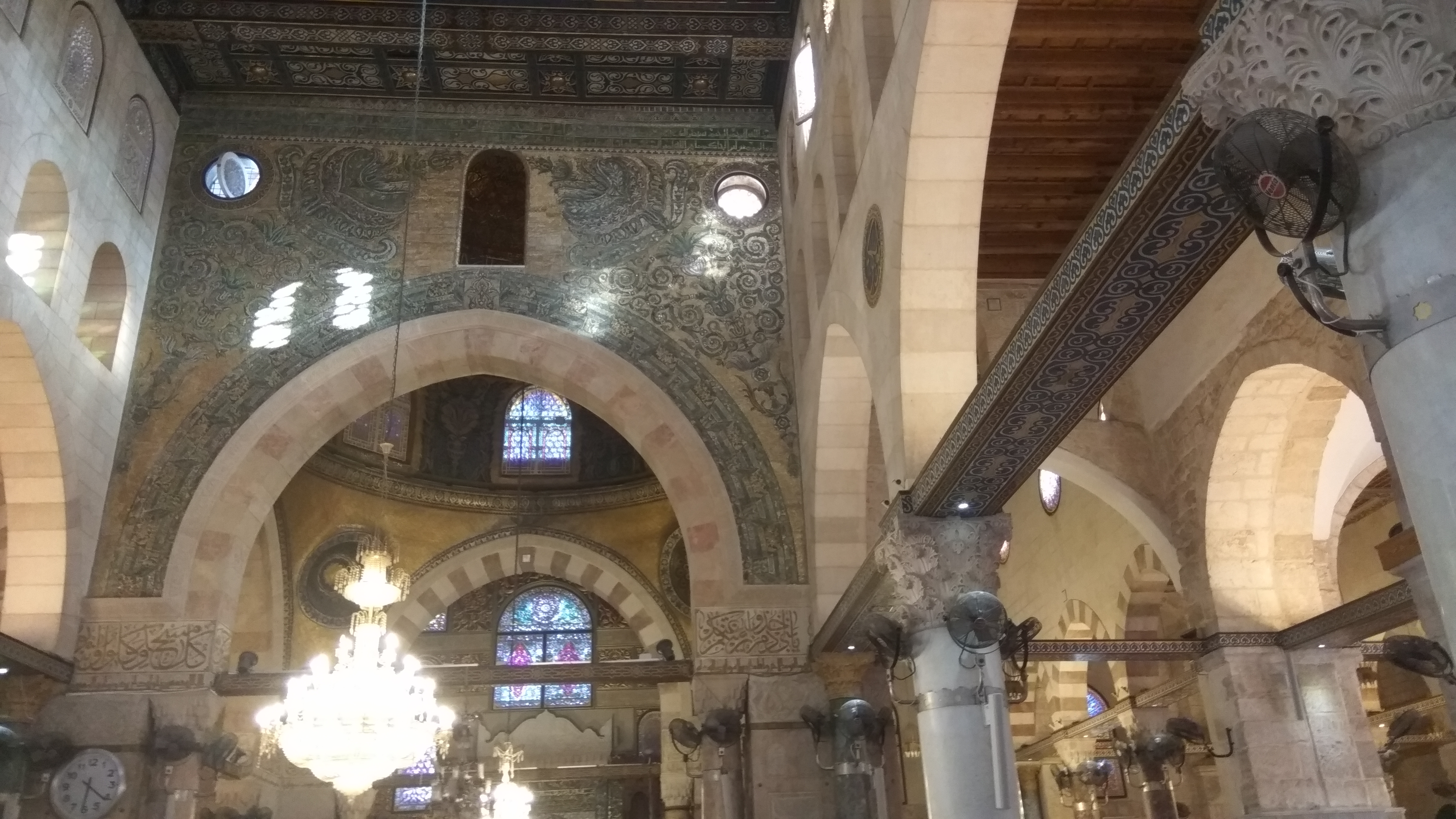
Decorated wall above the middle portico near the central dome facing main entrance, with the two-line Fatimid-era inscription above the arch

In 970, the Egypt-based Fatimid Caliphate conquered Palestine from the Ikhshidids, nominal allegiants of the Abbasids. Unlike the Abbasids and the Muslim inhabitants of Jerusalem, who were Sunnis, the Fatimids followed Shia Islam in its Isma'ili form. In 1033, another earthquake severely damaged the mosque. The Fatimid caliph al-Zahir (r. 1021–1036) had the mosque reconstructed between 1034 and 1036, though work was not completed until 1065, during the reign of Caliph al-Mustansir (r. 1036–1094).

The new mosque was considerably smaller, reduced from fifteen aisles to seven, probably a reflection of the local population's significant decline by this time. (Note: A great famine during the reign of al-Ma'mun depleted the Muslim population, and the situation was exacerbated for all of the city's inhabitants during the city's plunder by the peasant rebels of al-Mubarqa. The situation may have recovered by the late 10th century, but the unprecedented depredations throughout Palestine by the Bedouins of the Banu Tayy under the Jarrahids in the 1020s likely caused a substantial decrease in the population.) Excluding the two aisles on each side of the central nave, each aisle was made up of eleven arches running perpendicular to the qibla. The central nave was twice the breadth of the other aisles and had a gabled roof with a dome. (Note: This description of al-Zahir's mosque is the general scholarly view and is based on archaeological studies carried out during restoration work in the 1920s and the diary of Nasir Khusraw's visit in 1047.) The mosque likely lacked the side doors of its predecessor.

A prominent and distinctive feature of the new construction was the rich mosaic program endowed to the drum of the dome, the pendentives leading to the dome, and the arch in front of the mihrab. These three adjoining areas covered by the mosaics are collectively referred to as the "triumphal arch" by Grabar or the "maqsura" by Pruitt. Mosaic designs were rare in Islamic architecture in the post-Umayyad era and al-Zahir's mosaics were a revival of this Umayyad architectural practice, including Abd al-Malik's mosaics in the Dome of the Rock, but on a larger scale. The drum mosaic depicts a luxurious garden inspired by the Umayyad or Classical style. The four pendentives are gold and characterized by indented roundels with alternating gold and silver planes and patterns of peacock's eyes, eight-pointed stars, and palm fronds. On the arch are large depictions of vegetation emanating from small vases.

Atop the arch leading to the domed area is a lengthy two-line inscription in gold directly linking the al-Aqsa Mosque with Muhammad's Night Journey (the isra and mi'raj) from the "masjid al-haram" to the "masjid al-aqsa". It marked the first instance of this Quranic verse being inscribed in Jerusalem, leading Grabar to hypothesize that it was an official move by the Fatimids to magnify the site's sacred character. The inscription credits al-Zahir for renovating the mosque and two otherwise unknown figures, Abu al-Wasim and a sharif, al-Hasan al-Husayni, for supervising the work. (Note: The inscription above the central mihrab reads In the name of God, the Compassionate, the Merciful, Glory to the One who took his servant for a journey by night from the masjid al-haram to the masjid al-aqsa whose precincts we have blessed. [... He] has renovated it, our lord Ali Abu al-Hasan the imam al-Zahir li-i'zaz Din Allah, Commander of the Faithful, son of al-Hakim bi-Amr Allah, Commander of the Faithful, may the blessing of God be on him and his pure ancestors, and on his noble descendants [Shia religious formula alluding to the descendants of Muhammad through his daughter Fatima and her husband Ali, Muhammad's cousin]. By the hand of Ali ibn Abd al-Rahman, may God reward him. The [job] was supervised by Abu al-Wasim and al-Sharif al-Hasan al-Husaini.)

Nasir Khusraw described the mosque during his 1047 visit. He deemed it "very large", measuring 420 by 150 cubits on its western side. The distance between each "sculptured" marble column, 280 in number, was six cubits. The columns were supported by stone arches and lead joints. He noted the following features:

... the mosque is everywhere flagged with coloured marble ... The Maksurah [or space railed off for the officials] is facing the centre of the south wall [of the Mosque and Haram Area], and is of such size as to contain sixteen columns. Above rises a mighty dome that is ornamented with enamel work.

Al-Zahir's substantial investment in the Haram, including the al-Aqsa Mosque, amid the political instability in the capital Cairo, rebellions by Bedouin tribes, especially the Jarrahids of Palestine, and plagues, indicate the caliph's "commitment to Jerusalem", in Pruitt's words. Although the city had experienced decreases in its population in the preceding decades, the Fatimids attempted to build up the magnificence and symbolism of the mosque, and the Haram in general, for their own religious and political reasons. (Note: The Fatimid efforts to strengthen the Muslim position in Jerusalem, starting from the reign of al-Zahir's predecessor, Caliph al-Hakim, was part of a proxy religious conflict between them and the Christian Byzantine Empire. From at least the 9th century, efforts had been underway to boost the city's Christian edifices, such as the Holy Sepulchre, and pilgrimage infrastructure by Christian powers and leaders, including the Carolingian Empire and the patriarch of Jerusalem, in the backdrop of renewed Byzantine offensive action against Islamic Syria. Recurrences of mob violence by the city's Muslims against Christians are reported in the 10th century, a time in which al-Muqaddasi laments that Christians and Jews in Jerusalem held the upper hand against the Muslims. The Fatimid inscription also points to al-Zahir's reassertion of the orthodox Muslim narrative of the Night Journey and Muhammad's primacy in Islam against the claims by the Druze, a newly emergent outgrowth of Isma'ili Islam in Egypt and Syria, of al-Hakim's divinity and occultation.) The present-day mosque largely retains al-Zahir's plan.

Fatimid investment in Jerusalem ground to a halt toward the end of the 11th century as their rule became further destabilized. In 1071, a Turkish mercenary, Atsiz, was invited by the city's Fatimid governor to rein in the Bedouin, but he turned on the Fatimids, besieging and capturing Jerusalem that year. A few years later, the inhabitants revolted against him, and were slaughtered by Atsiz, including those who had taken shelter in the al-Aqsa Mosque. He was killed by the Turkish Seljuks in 1078, establishing Seljuk rule over the city, which lasted until the Fatimids regained control in 1098.

=== Crusader and Ayyubid periods ===
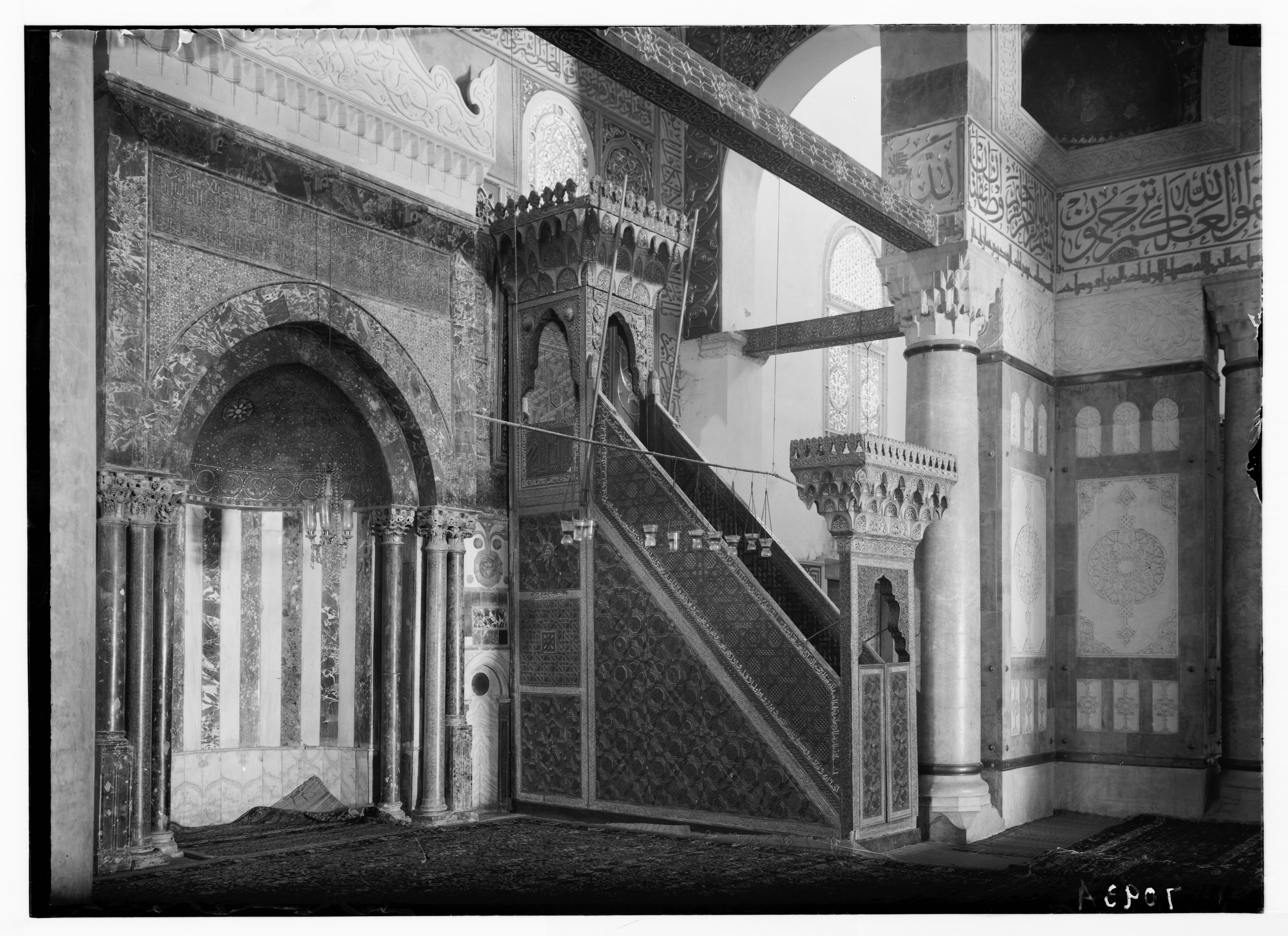
The original minbar installed under Saladin in 1187. The minbar was built on Nur al-Din's orders in 1168 in Damascus, and destroyed in the arson attack of 1969.

Jerusalem was captured by the Crusaders in 1099, during the First Crusade. They named the mosque Templum Solomonis (Solomon's Temple), distinguishing it from the Dome of the Rock, which they named Templum Domini (Temple of God). While the Dome of the Rock was turned into a Christian church under the care of the Augustinians, the al-Aqsa Mosque was used as a royal palace and also as a stable for horses. In 1119, the Crusader king accommodated the headquarters of the Knights Templar next to his palace within the building. During this period, the mosque underwent some structural changes, including the expansion of its northern porch, and the addition of an apse and a dividing wall. A new cloister and church were also built at the site, along with various other structures. The Templars constructed vaulted western and eastern annexes to the building; the western currently serves as the women's mosque and the eastern as the Islamic Museum.

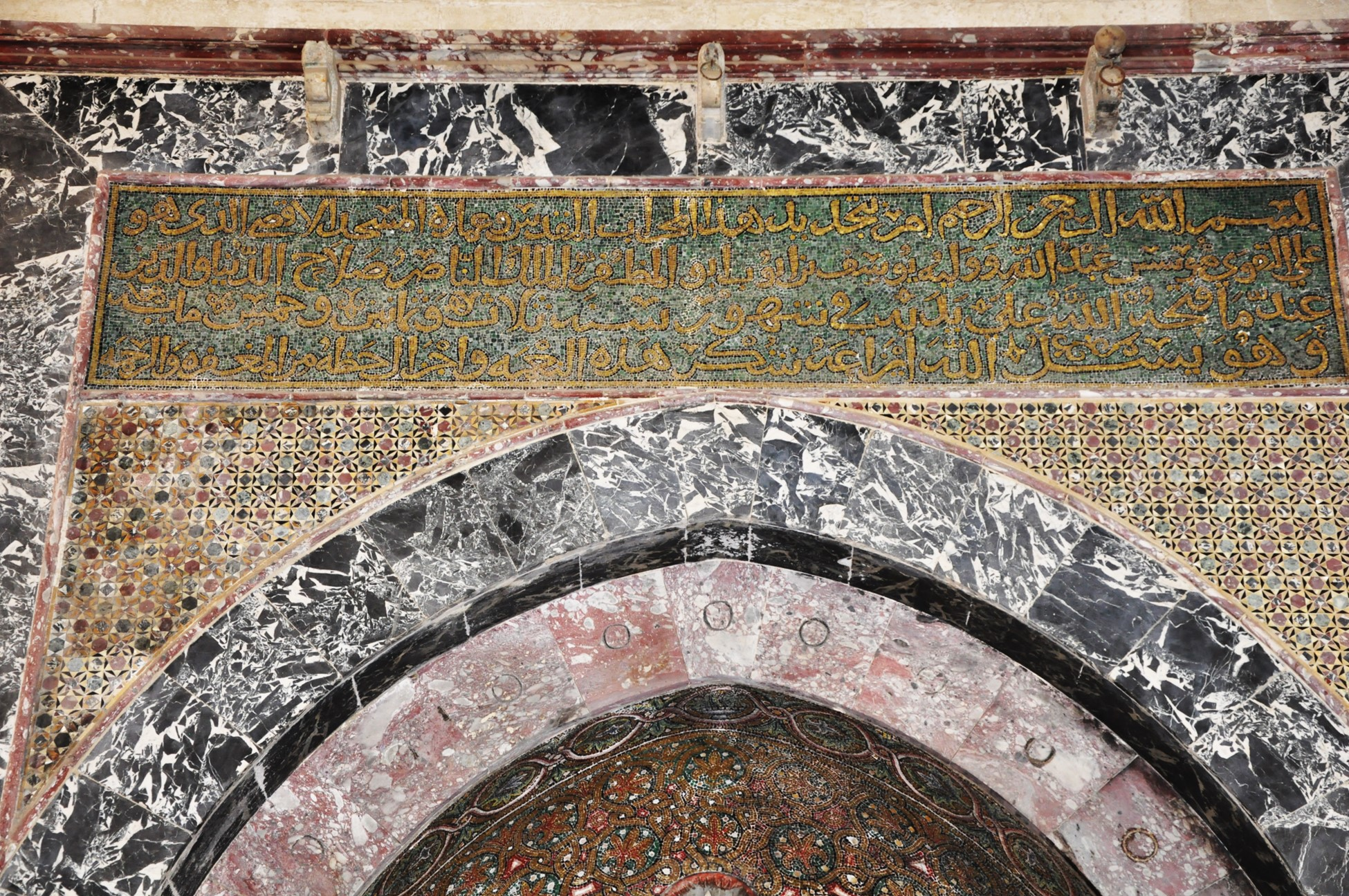
The inscription above the mihrab dated to 583 AH (1187 CE), commemorating its restoration by the Ayyubid Saladin

After the Ayyubids under the leadership of Saladin reconquered Jerusalem following the siege of 1187, several repairs and renovations were undertaken at al-Aqsa Mosque. In order to prepare the mosque for Friday prayers, within a week of his capture of Jerusalem Saladin had the toilets and grain stores installed by the Crusaders at al-Aqsa removed, the floors covered with precious carpets, and its interior scented with rosewater and incense. This restoration is commemorated by an inscription in Arabic naskhi script executed in a gilded glass mosaic panel above the mihrab. Saladin's predecessor—the Zengid sultan Nur al-Din—had also commissioned the construction of a new minbar or "pulpit" made of ivory and wood in 1168–69, which was completed after his death. Nur ad-Din's minbar was added to the mosque in November 1187 by Saladin, placed next to the mihrab.

The Ayyubid sultan of Damascus, al-Mu'azzam, built the northern porch of the mosque with three gates in 1218. In 1345, the Mamluk sultan al-Kamil Sha'ban added two naves and two gates to the mosque's eastern side.

=== Mamluk and Ottoman periods ===
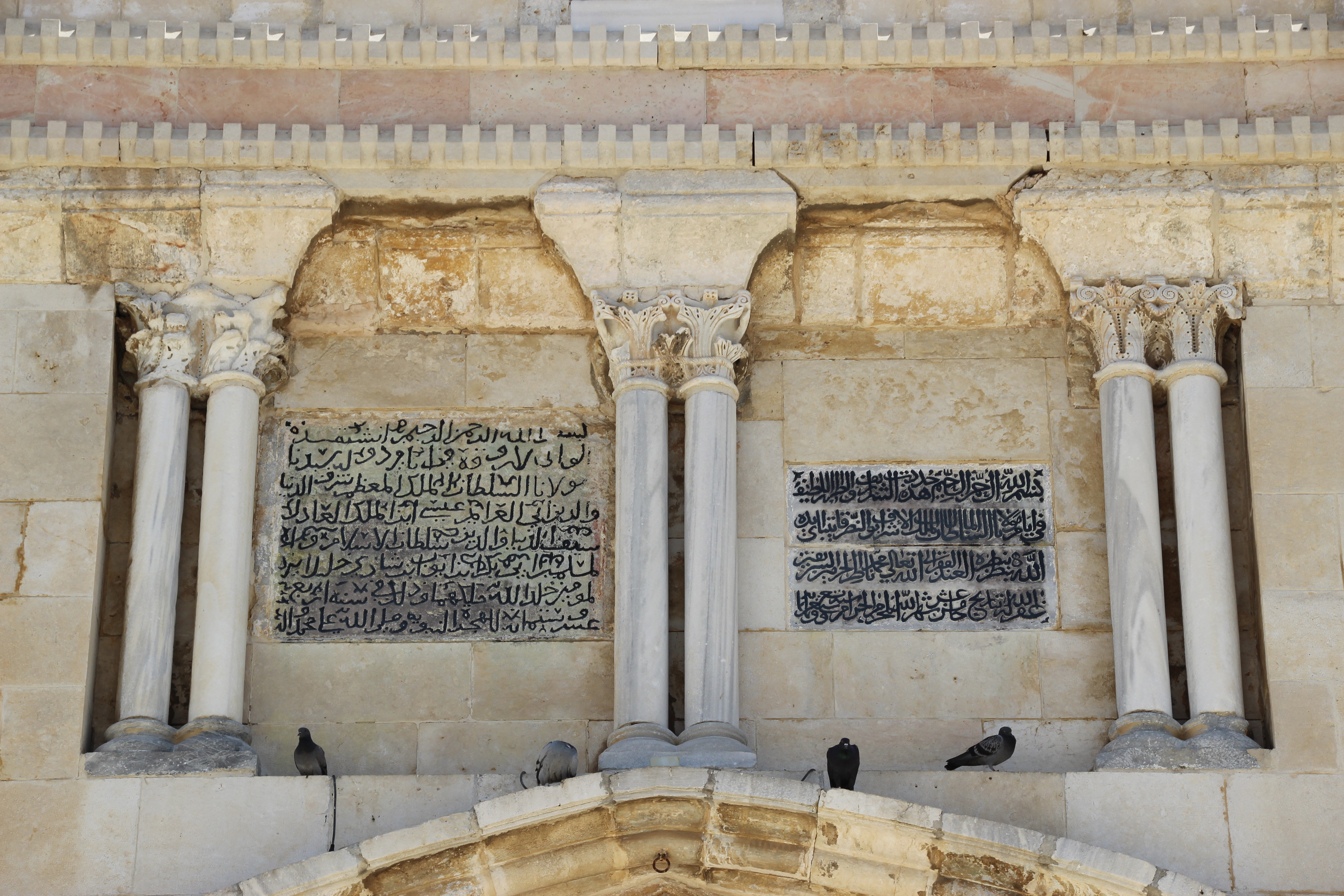
On the mosque façade, the left inscription commemorates al-Adil I’s renovation, while the right records Qaitbay’s restoration

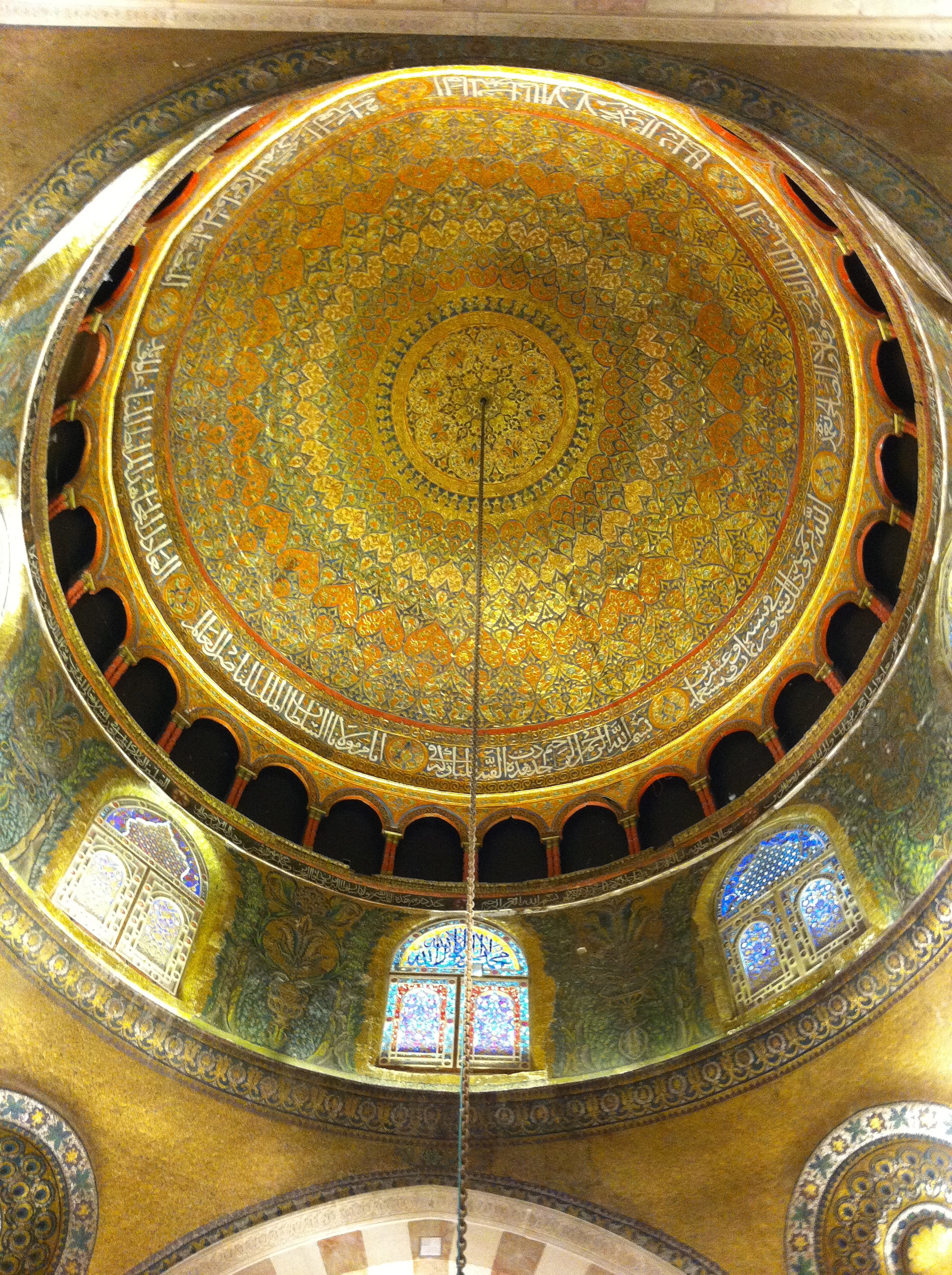
Fatimid-era Interior decoration of the main dome, with inscriptions recording restorations by the Mamluk Sultan Al-Nasir Muhammad in 728 AH (1328 CE) and the Ottoman Sultan Mahmud II in 1233 AH (1818 CE)

During the Mamluk period, in 1327-1328 (728 AH), Sultan al-Nasir Muhammad ordered the restoration of the mosque's dome, as indicated in the commemorative inscription inscribed on it. He also rebuilt the southern wall of the Haram, while Sultan Qaitbay restored the mosque's lead roof.

After the Ottomans conquered Palestine in 1517, they did not undertake any major renovations or repairs to the mosque. They made architectural contributions elsewhere on the Haram, including building the Fountain of Qasim Pasha (1527) and three free-standing domes—the most notable being the Dome of the Prophet built in 1538, and restoring the Pool of Raranj. These constructions were commissioned by the Ottoman governors of Jerusalem, rather than the sultans, whose contributions were limited to additions to the existing minarets.

According to the observations of the scholars Ibrahim al-Khiyari of Medina and Abd al-Ghani al-Nabulsi of Damascus, who respectively visited Jerusalem in 1670 and 1690, the mihrab of al-Aqsa Mosque was reserved for the imam of the Shafi'i madhhab (school of law), with the Dome of the Rock's mihrab designated for the imam of the Hanafis. The khatib (preacher) of the mosque was a distant relative of al-Nabulsi, Muhammad ibn Jama'a.

In 1710, the Damascene scholar Mustafa al-Bakri al-Siddiqi spent most of his visit to Jerusalem at al-Aqsa Mosque, penning much poetry extolling its virtues. At the time of the visit by al-Luqaimi of Damietta in 1731, the khatib of the mosque was Ibn Jama'a's son Nur al-Din al-Jama'i. In the last decade of the 18th century (or start of the 19th century), the Maghrebi traveler al-Zayyani visited the mosque, which he noted was the principal place of prayer on the compound, and recorded a detailed description of its interior decoration, especially the predominant use of gilding.

In 1816, the mosque was restored by Sulayman Pasha al-Adil, the Acre-based governor of Sidon, after having been in a dilapidated state. The mosque was damaged by the Galilee earthquake of 1837.

=== 20th century ===
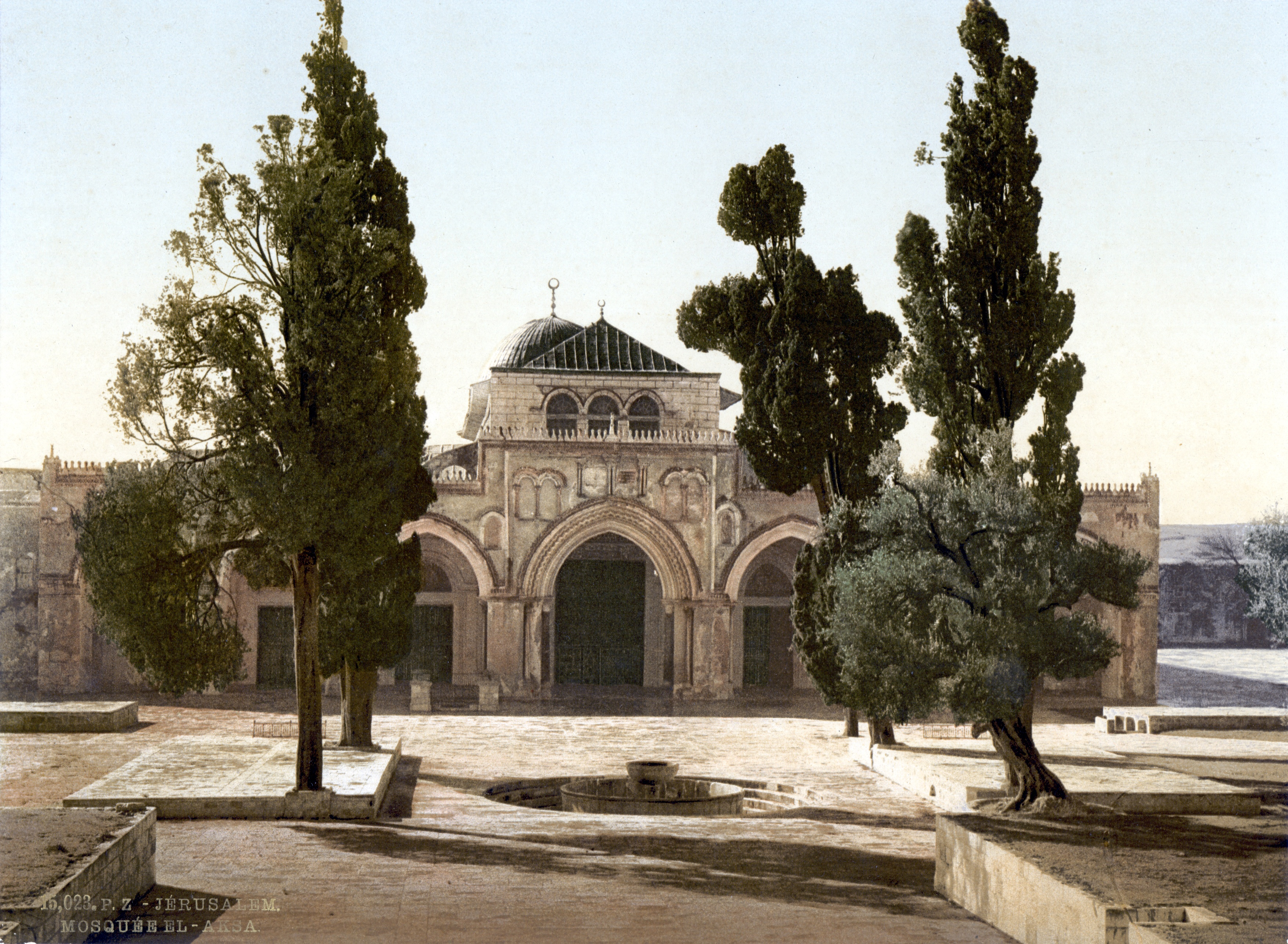
The front view in 1900

The first renovation in the 20th century occurred in 1922, when the Supreme Muslim Council under Amin al-Husayni (the Grand Mufti of Jerusalem) commissioned the Turkish architect Ahmet Kemalettin Bey to restore al-Aqsa Mosque and the monuments in its precincts. The council also commissioned British architects, Egyptian engineering experts and local officials to contribute to and oversee the repairs and additions which were carried out in 1924–25 by Kemalettin. The renovations included reinforcing the mosque's ancient Umayyad foundations, rectifying the interior columns, replacing the beams, erecting a scaffolding, conserving the arches and drum of the main dome's interior, rebuilding the southern wall, and replacing timber in the central nave with a slab of concrete. The renovations also revealed Fatimid-era mosaics and inscriptions on the interior arches that had been covered with plasterwork. The arches were decorated with gold and green-tinted gypsum and their timber tie beams were replaced with brass. A quarter of the stained glass windows also were carefully renewed so as to preserve their original Abbasid and Fatimid designs.

Severe damage was caused by the 1927 Jericho earthquake earthquake. The damage from the 1927 earthquake and a small tremor in the summer of 1937 caused the roof of the mosque to collapse. Repairs were undertaken in 1938 and 1942. The upper part of the north wall of the mosque was reconstructed and the whole interior of the roofing was refaced. Other repairs included the partial reconstruction of the jambs and lintels of the central doors, the refacing of the front of five bays of the porch, and the demolition of the vaulted buildings that formerly adjoined the east side of the mosque. Italian Fascist leader Benito Mussolini donated Carrara marble columns in the late 1930s.

On 20 July 1951, King Abdullah I was shot three times by a Palestinian gunman as he entered the mosque, killing him. His grandson Prince Hussein, was at his side and was also hit, though a medal he was wearing on his chest deflected the bullet.

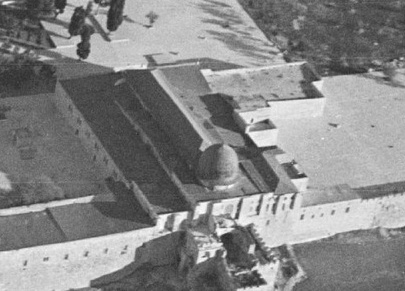
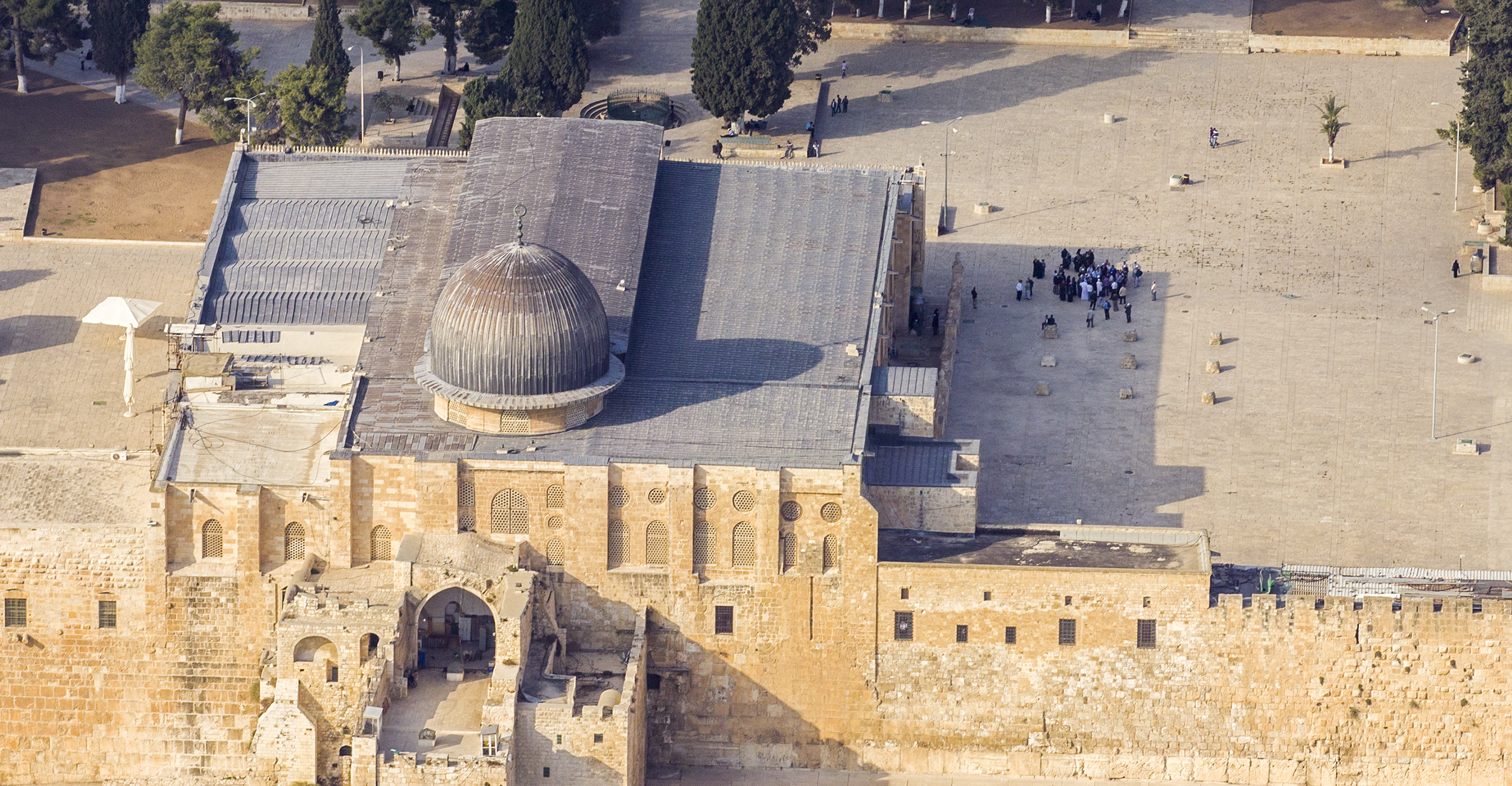
The eastern section of the Qibli Mosque (visible in 1934) before and after it was destroyed following the arson fire in 1969

The site fell under Israeli control on 7 June 1967, during the Six Day War. On 21 August 1969, a fire was started by a visitor from Australia named Denis Michael Rohan, an evangelical Christian who hoped that by burning down al-Aqsa Mosque he would hasten the Second Coming of Jesus. In response to the incident, a summit of Islamic countries was held in Rabat that same year, hosted by Faisal of Saudi Arabia, the then king of Saudi Arabia. The al-Aqsa fire is regarded as one of the catalysts for the formation of the Organisation of the Islamic Conference (OIC, now the Organisation of Islamic Cooperation) in 1972. Following the fire, the dome was reconstructed in concrete and covered with anodized aluminium, instead of the original ribbed lead enamel work sheeting. In 1983, the aluminium outer covering was replaced with lead to match the original design by az-Zahir.

In the 1980s, Ben Shoshan and Yehuda Etzion, both members of the Gush Emunim Underground, plotted to blow up the al-Aqsa mosque and the Dome of the Rock. Etzion believed that blowing up the two mosques would cause a spiritual awakening in Israel, and would solve all the problems of the Jewish people. They also hoped the Third Temple of Jerusalem would be built on the location of the mosque.

=== 21st century ===
On 5 November 2014, Israeli police entered Al-Aqsa for the first time since capturing Jerusalem in 1967, said Sheikh Azzam Al-Khatib, director of the Islamic Waqf. Previous media reports of 'storming Al-Aqsa' referred to the Haram al-Sharif compound rather than the Al-Aqsa mosque itself.

== Architecture ==
The rectangular al-Aqsa Mosque and its precincts cover 14.4 hectares (36 acres), although the mosque itself is about 1.1 acres (0.46 ha) in area and can hold up to 5,000 worshippers. It is 83 m (272 ft) long, 56 m (184 ft) wide. Unlike the Dome of the Rock, which reflects classical Byzantine architecture, the Aqsa Mosque is characteristic of early Islamic architecture.

=== Dome ===
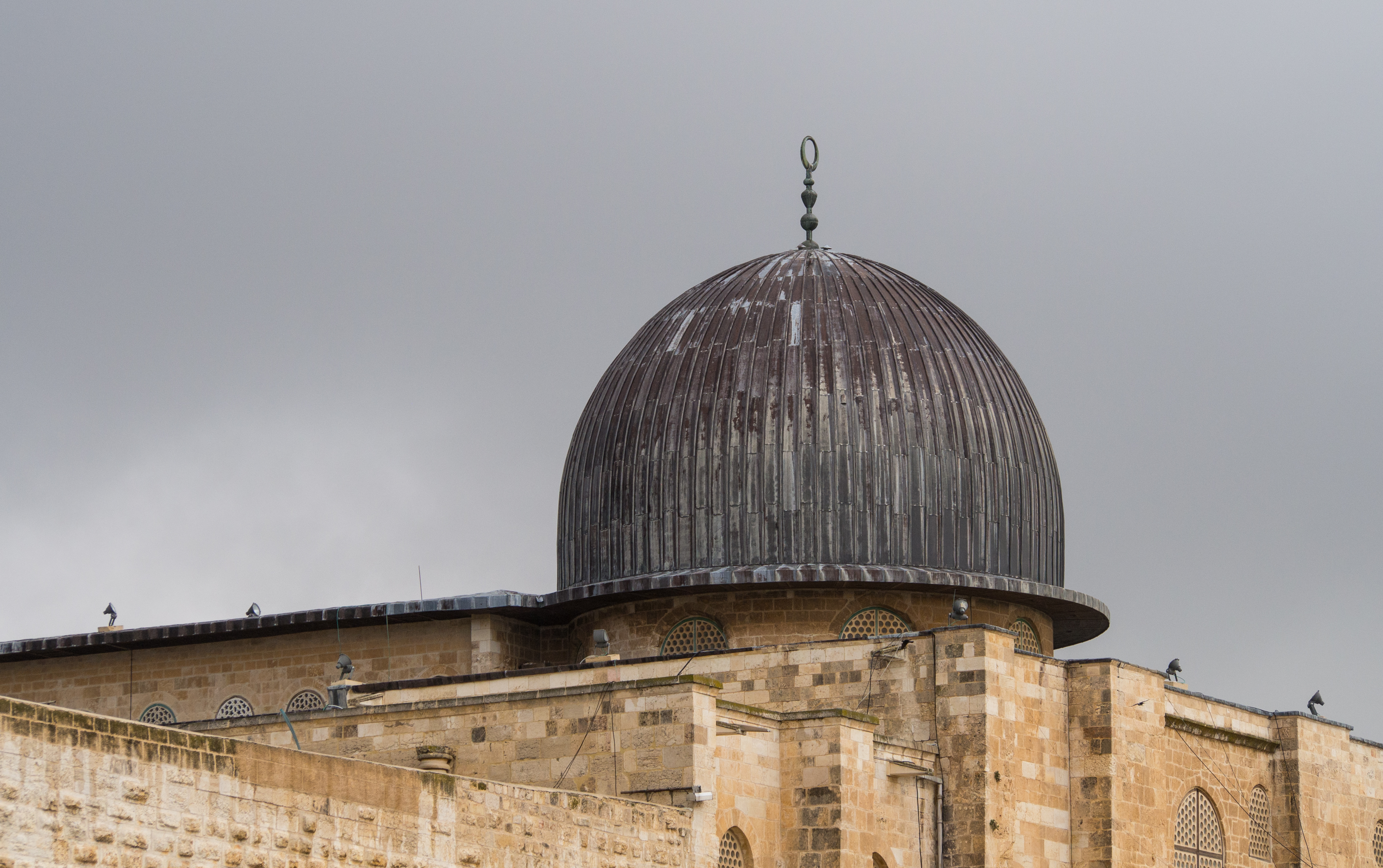
The silver-colored dome consists of lead sheeting

Nothing remains of the original dome built by Abd al-Malik. The present-day dome mimicks that of az-Zahir, which consisted of wood plated with lead enamelwork, but which was destroyed by fire in 1969. Today it is made of concrete with lead sheeting.

Al-Aqsa's dome is one of the few domes to be built in front of the mihrab during the Umayyad and Abbasid periods, the others being the Umayyad Mosque in Damascus (715) and the Great Mosque of Sousse (850). The interior of the dome is painted with 14th-century-era decorations. During the 1969 burning, the paintings were assumed to be irreparably lost, but were completely reconstructed using the trateggio technique, a method that uses fine vertical lines to distinguish reconstructed areas from original ones.

=== Facade and porch ===
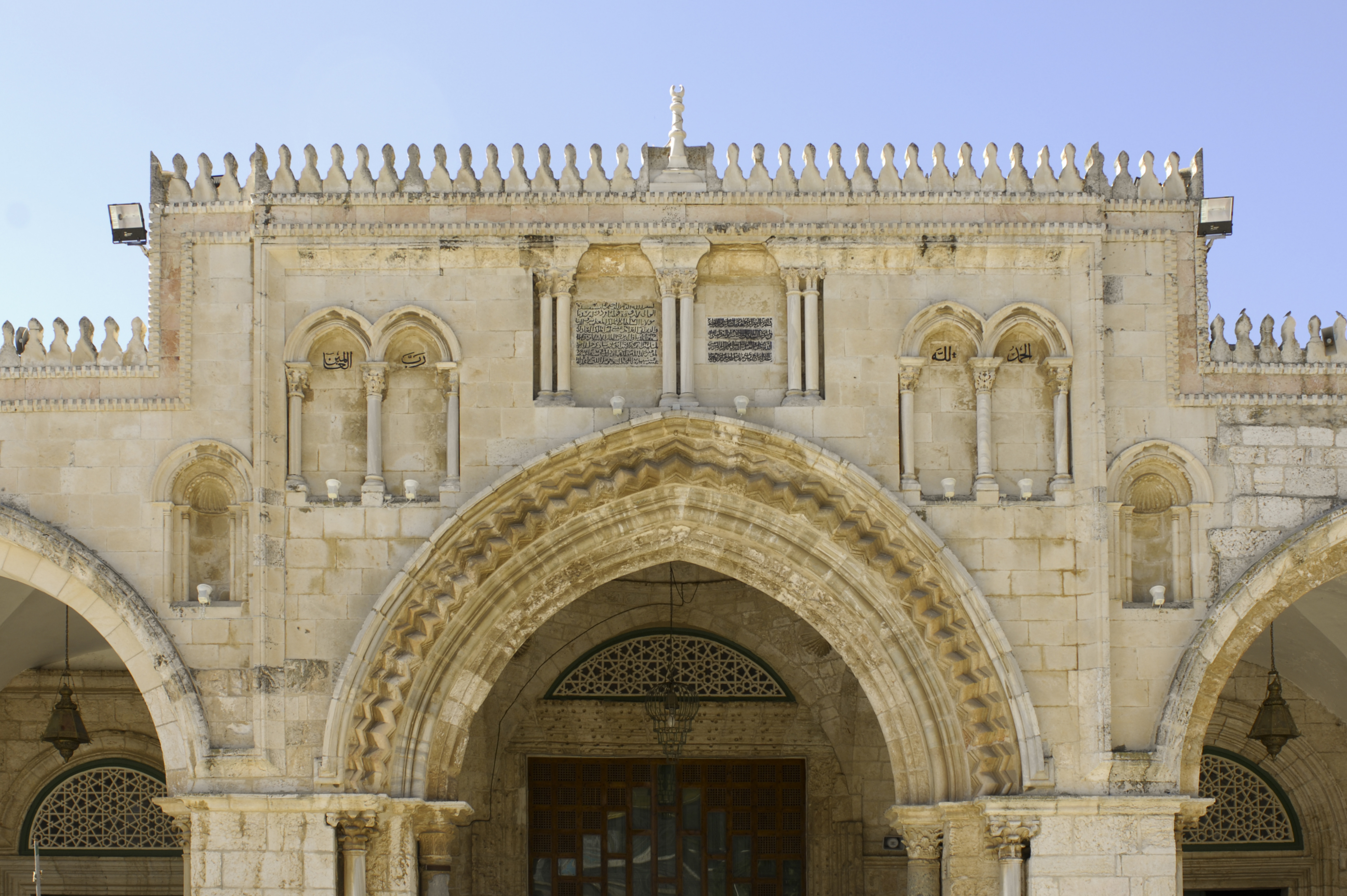
The facade of the mosque. It was constructed by the Fatimids, then expanded by the Crusaders, the Ayyubids and the Mamluks

The facade of the mosque was built in 1065 CE on the instructions of the Fatimid caliph al-Mustansir Billah. It was crowned with a balustrade consisting of arcades and small columns. The Crusaders damaged the facade, but it was restored and renovated by the Ayyubids. One addition was the covering of the facade with tiles. The second-hand material of the facade's arches includes sculpted, ornamental material taken from Crusader structures in Jerusalem. The facade consists of fourteen stone arches, most of which are of a Romanesque style. The outer arches added by the Mamluks follow the same general design. The entrance to the mosque is through the facade's central arch.

The porch is located at the top of the facade. The central bays of the porch were built by the Knights Templar during the First Crusade, but Saladin's nephew al-Mu'azzam Isa ordered the construction of the porch itself in 1217.

=== Interior ===
The al-Aqsa Mosque has seven aisles of hypostyle naves with several additional small halls to the west and east of the southern section of the building. There are 121 stained glass windows in the mosque from the Abbasid and Fatimid eras. About a fourth of them were restored in 1924. The spandrels of the arch opposite the main entrance include a mosaic decoration and inscription dating back to Fatimid period.

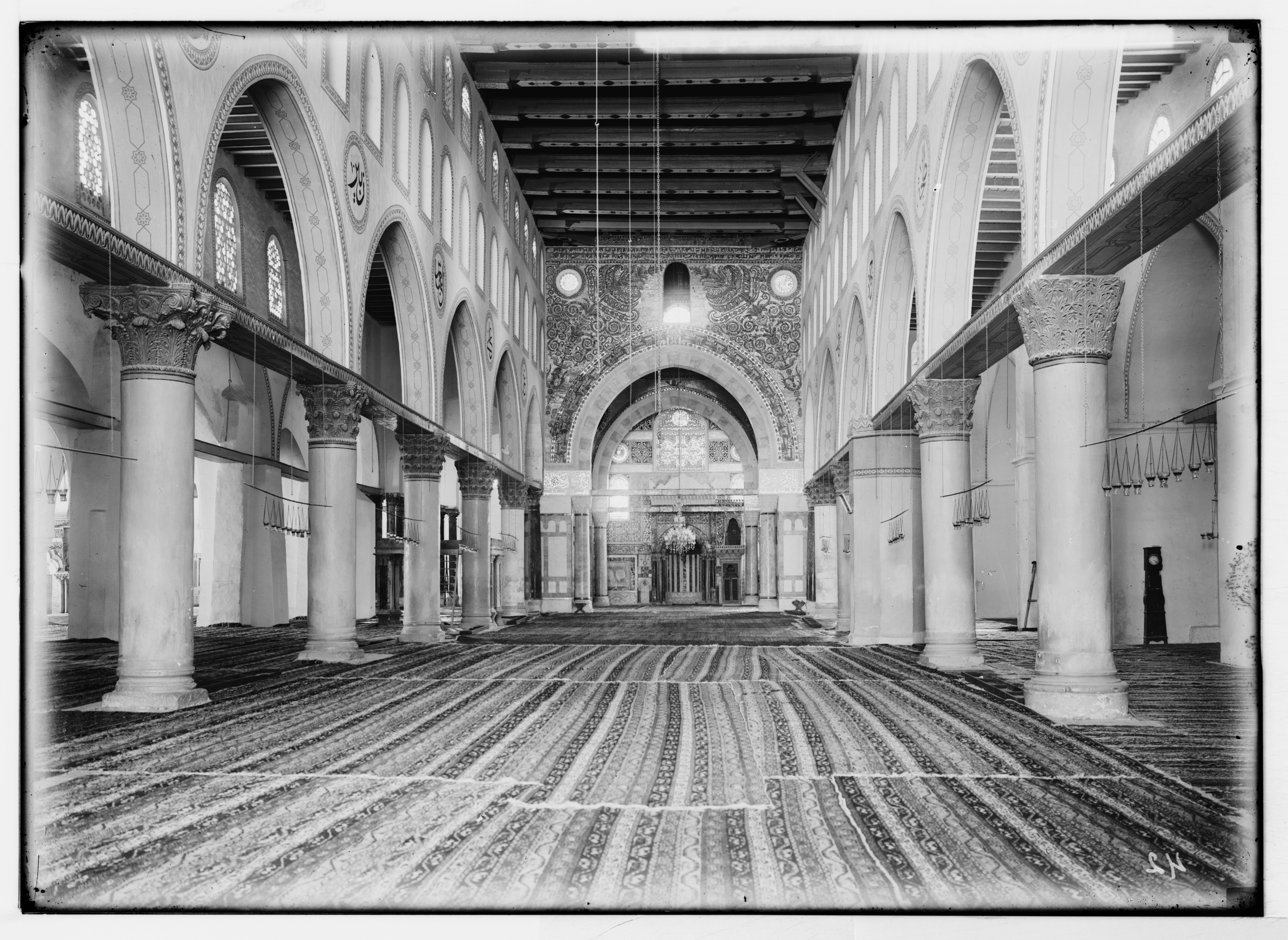
View of the hypostyle prayer hall (between 1898 and 1946)

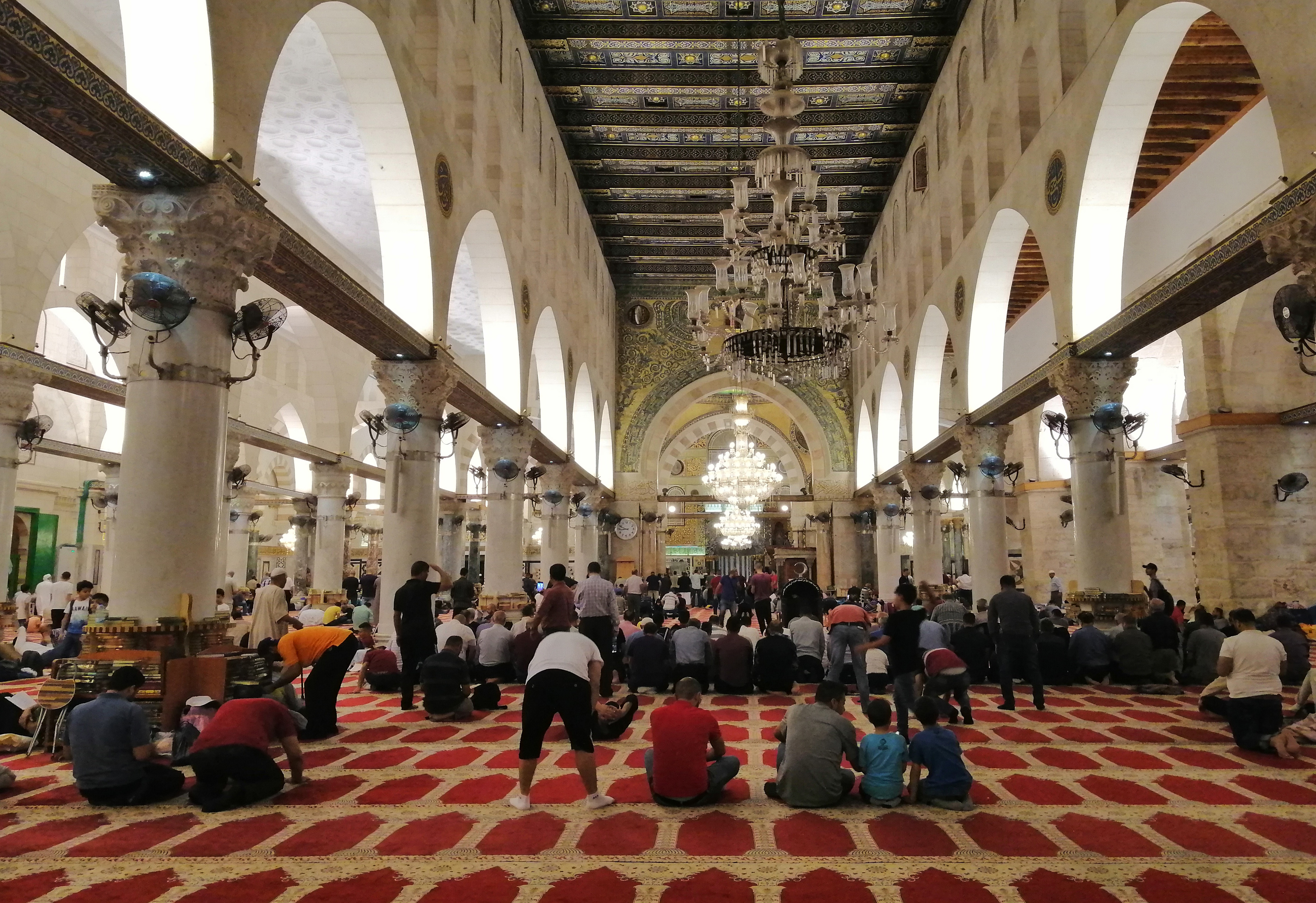
Interior view of the mosque facing the mihrab

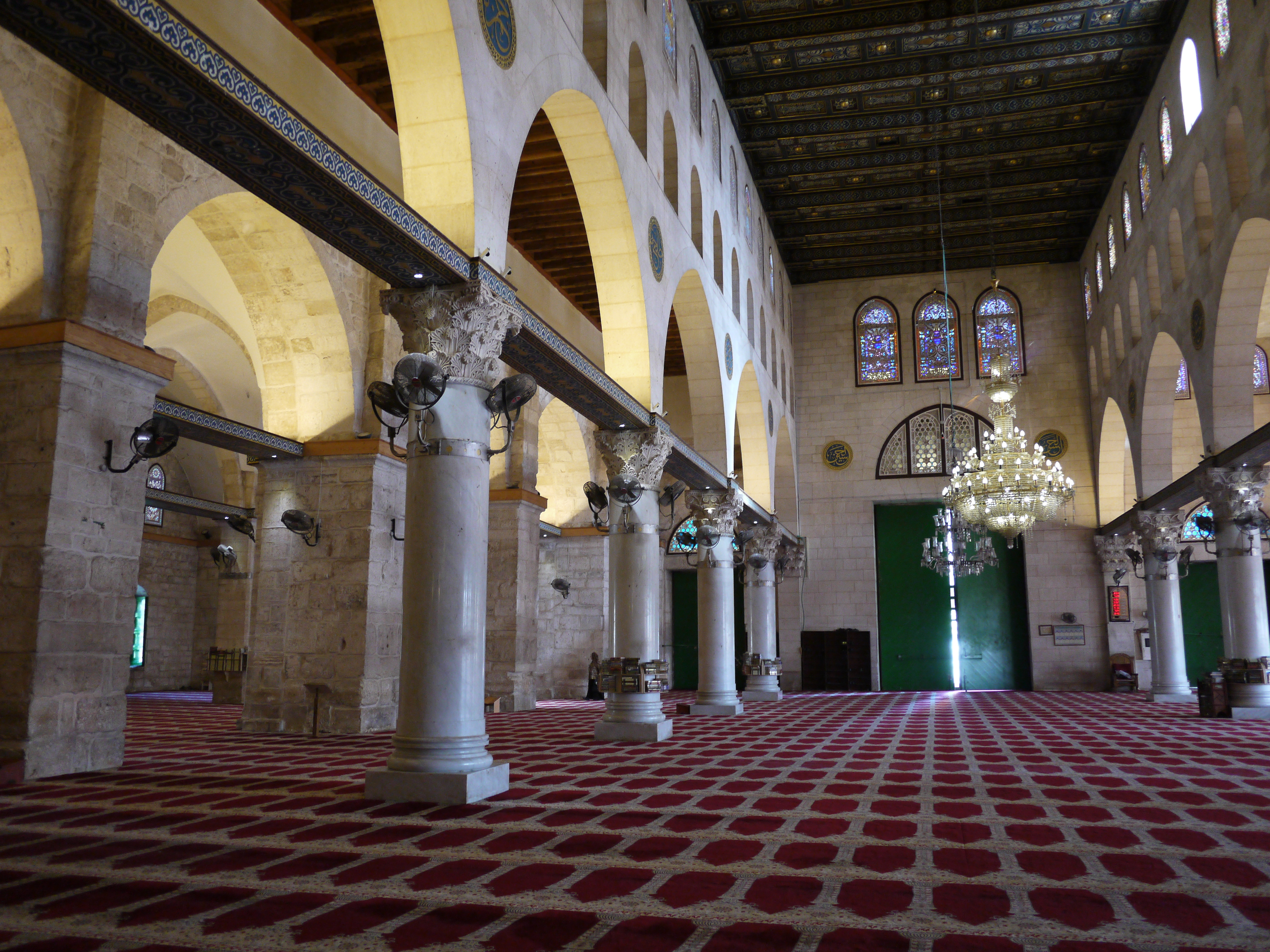
View of the hypostyle prayer hall

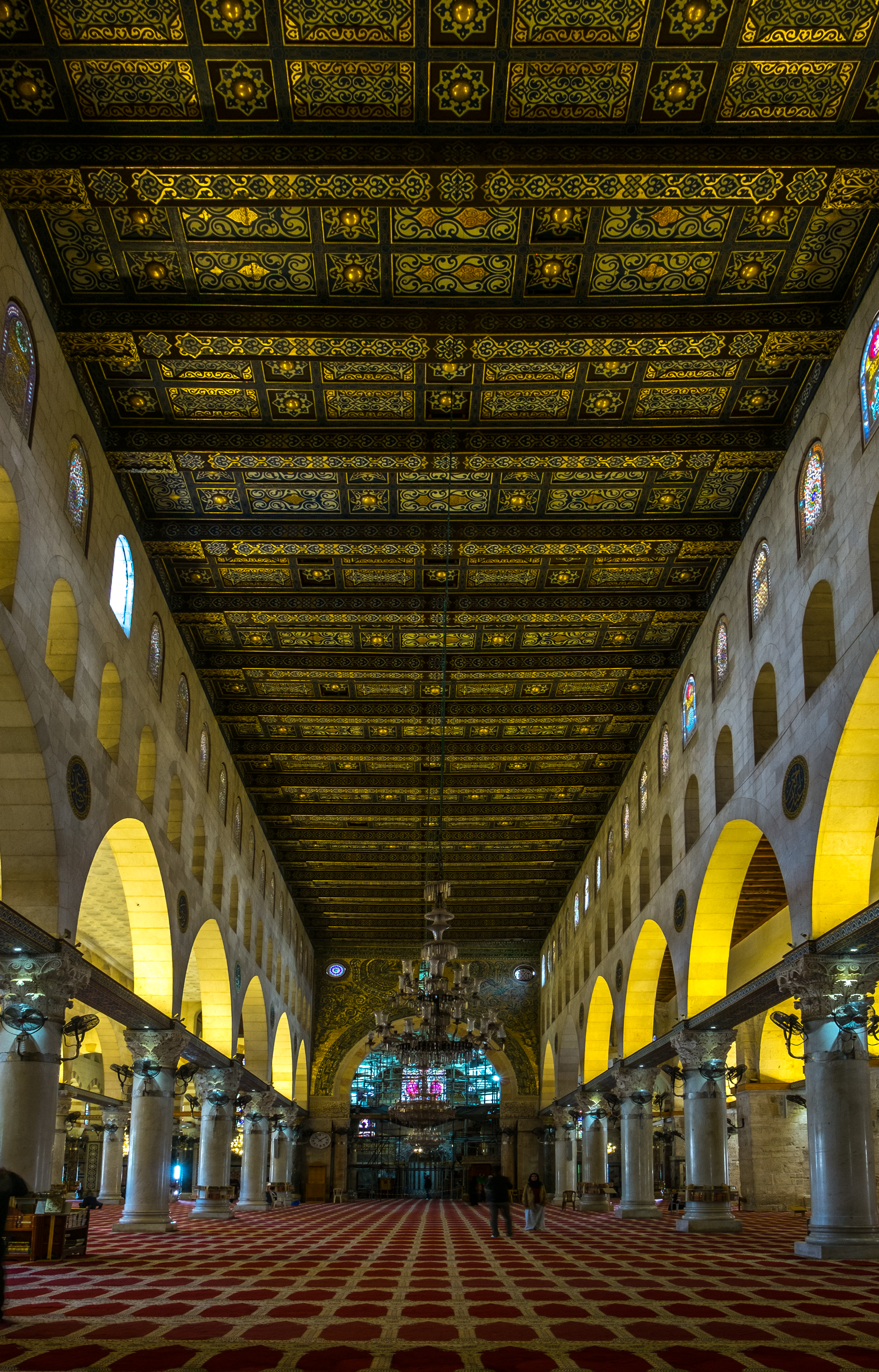
view of the ceiling facing the mihrab

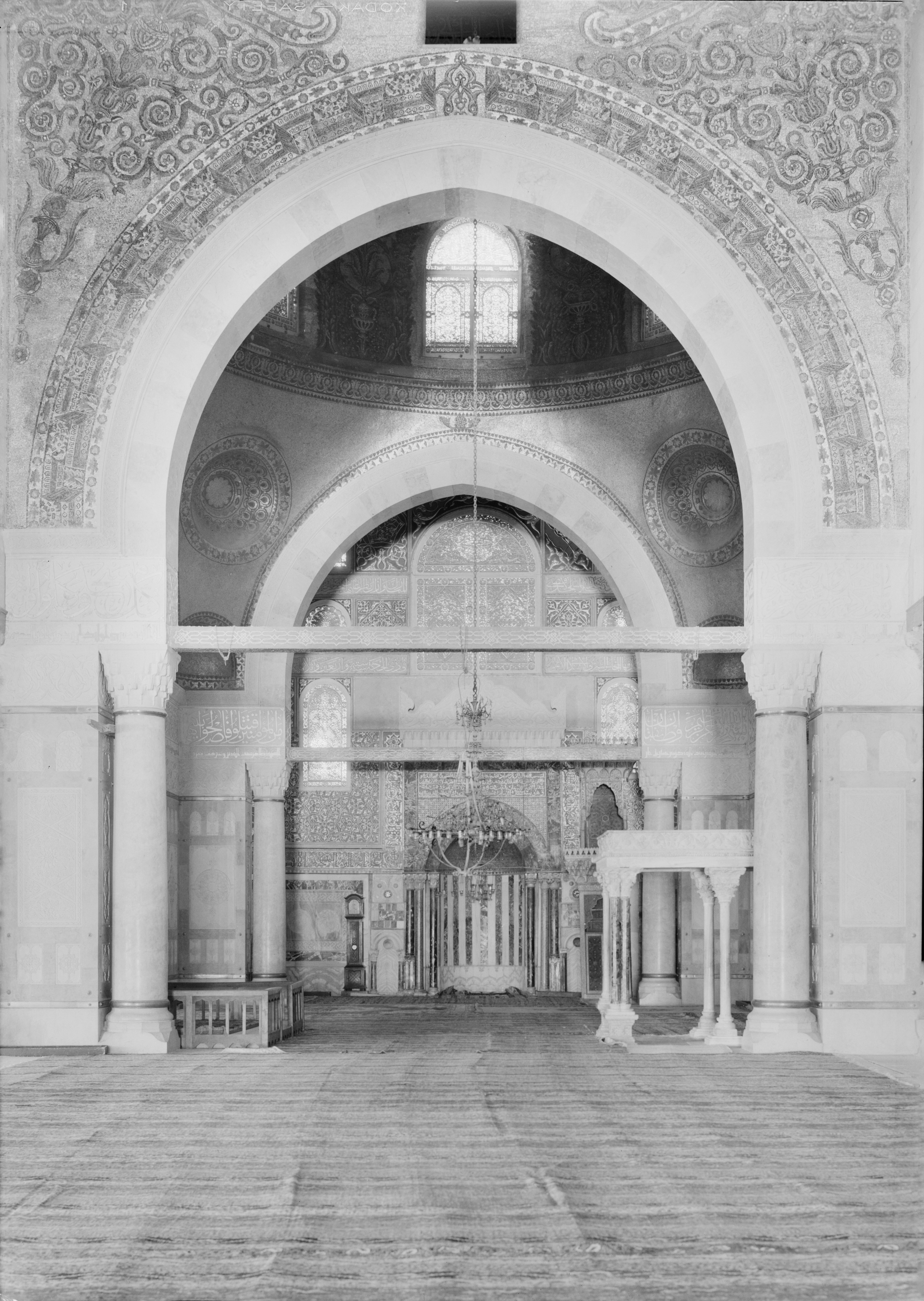
Interior view of the mosque showing the mihrab, indicating the qiblah (1943)

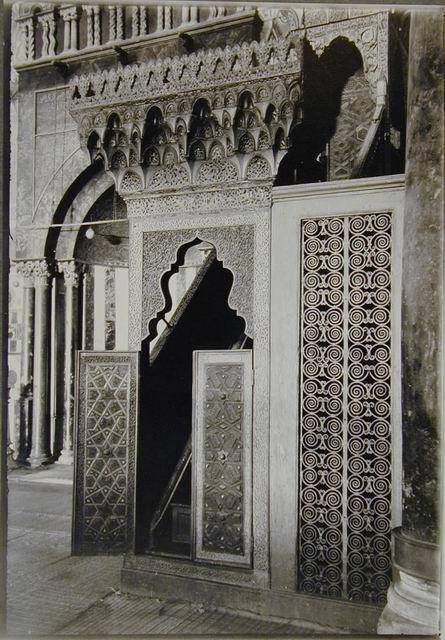
The doors of the Saladin Minbar, early 1900s.

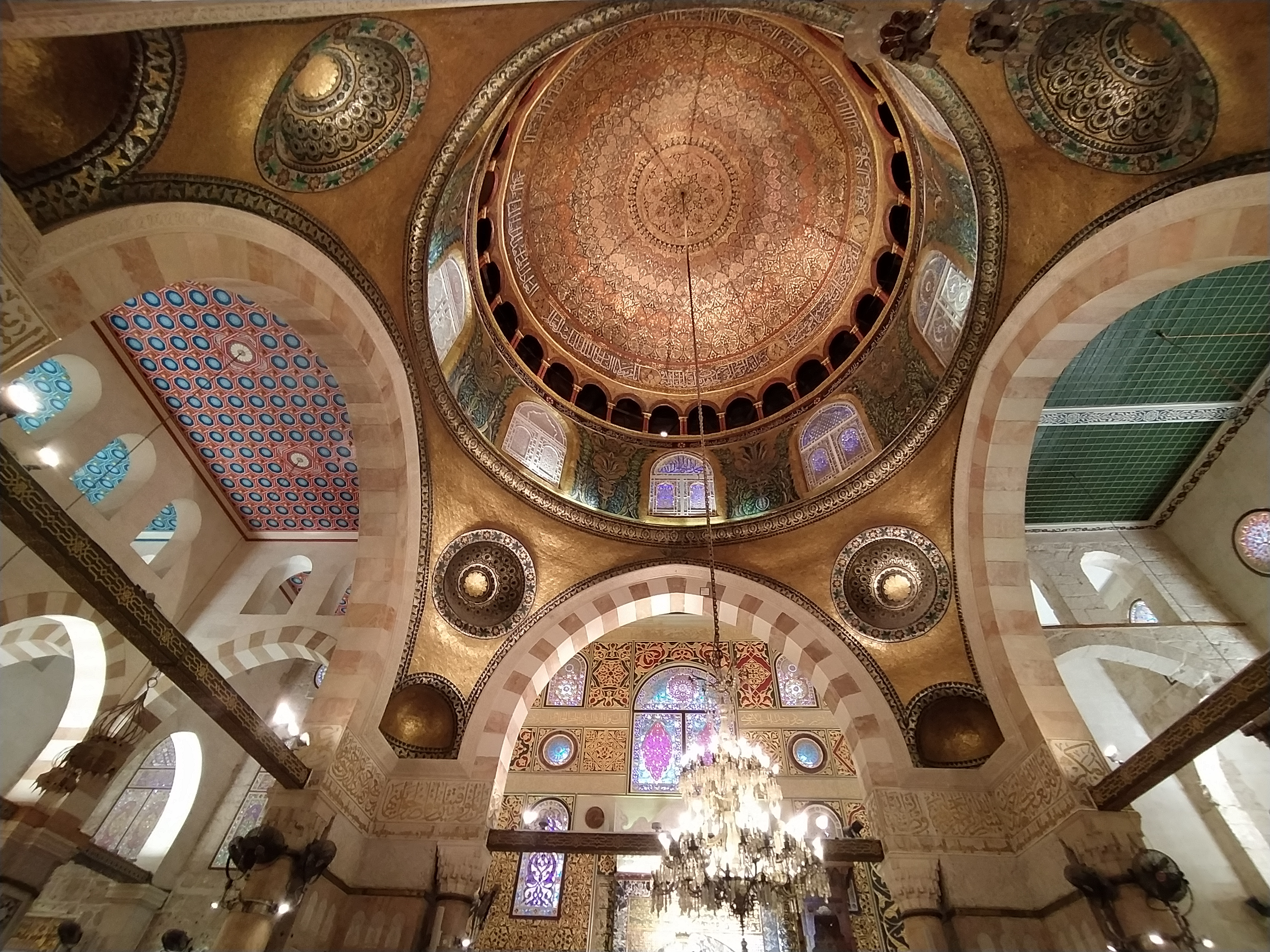
Interior of the dome

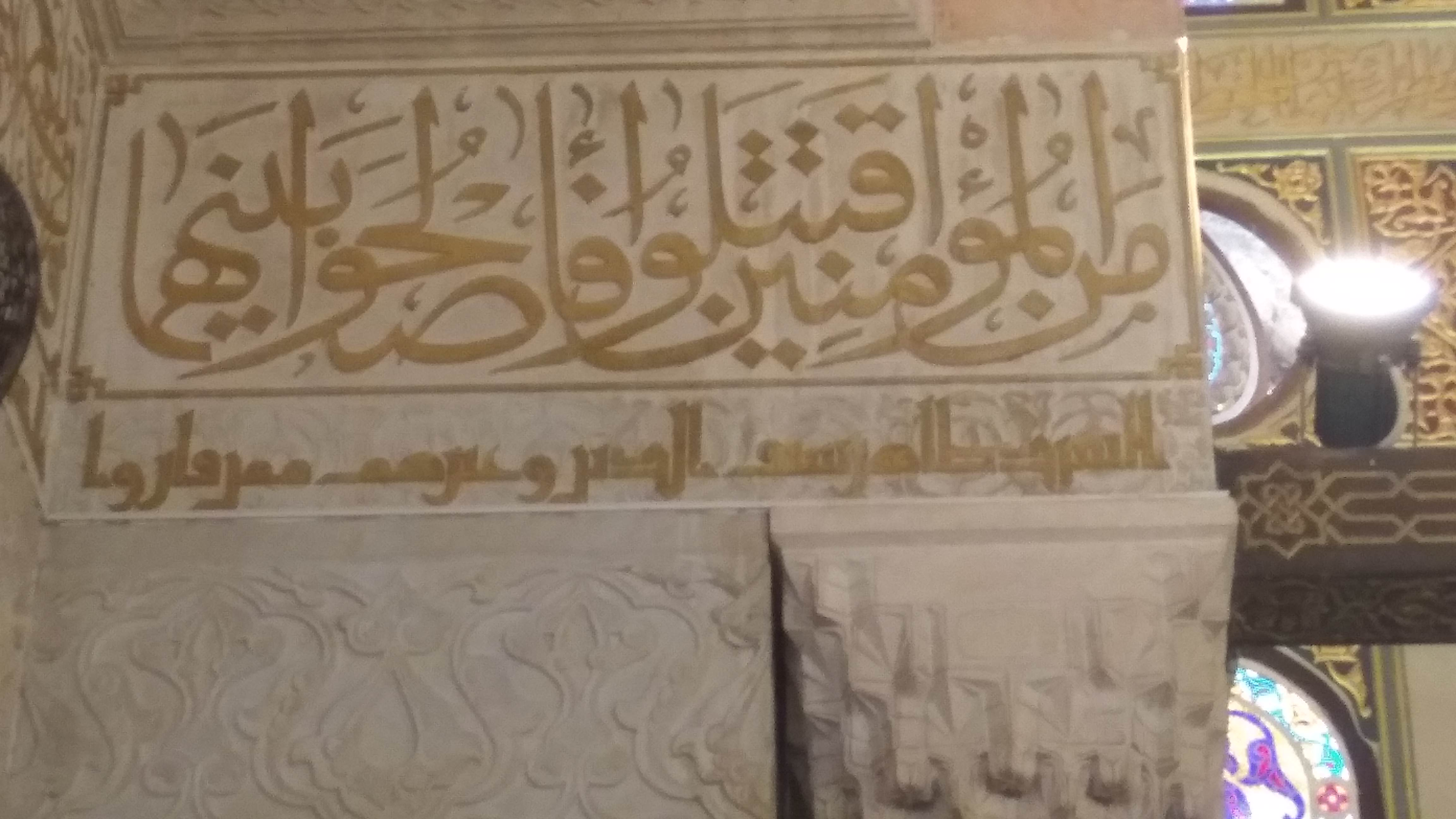
Inscription showing Quran's aayat & contributors name to restore dome of Aqsa after 1969 burning

The mosque's interior is supported by 45 columns, 33 of which are white marble and 12 of stone. The column rows of the central aisles are heavy and stunted. The remaining four rows are better proportioned. The capitals of the columns are of four different kinds: those in the central aisle are heavy and primitively designed, while those under the dome are of the Corinthian order, and made from Italian white marble. The capitals in the eastern aisle are of a heavy basket-shaped design and those east and west of the dome are also basket-shaped, but smaller and better proportioned. The columns and piers are connected by an architectural rave, which consists of beams of roughly squared timber enclosed in a wooden casing.

A great portion of the mosque is covered with whitewash, but the drum of the dome and the walls immediately beneath it are decorated with mosaics and marble. Some paintings by an Italian artist were introduced when repairs were undertaken at the mosque after an earthquake ravaged the mosque in 1927. The ceiling of the mosque was painted with funding by King Farouk of Egypt.

=== Minbar ===
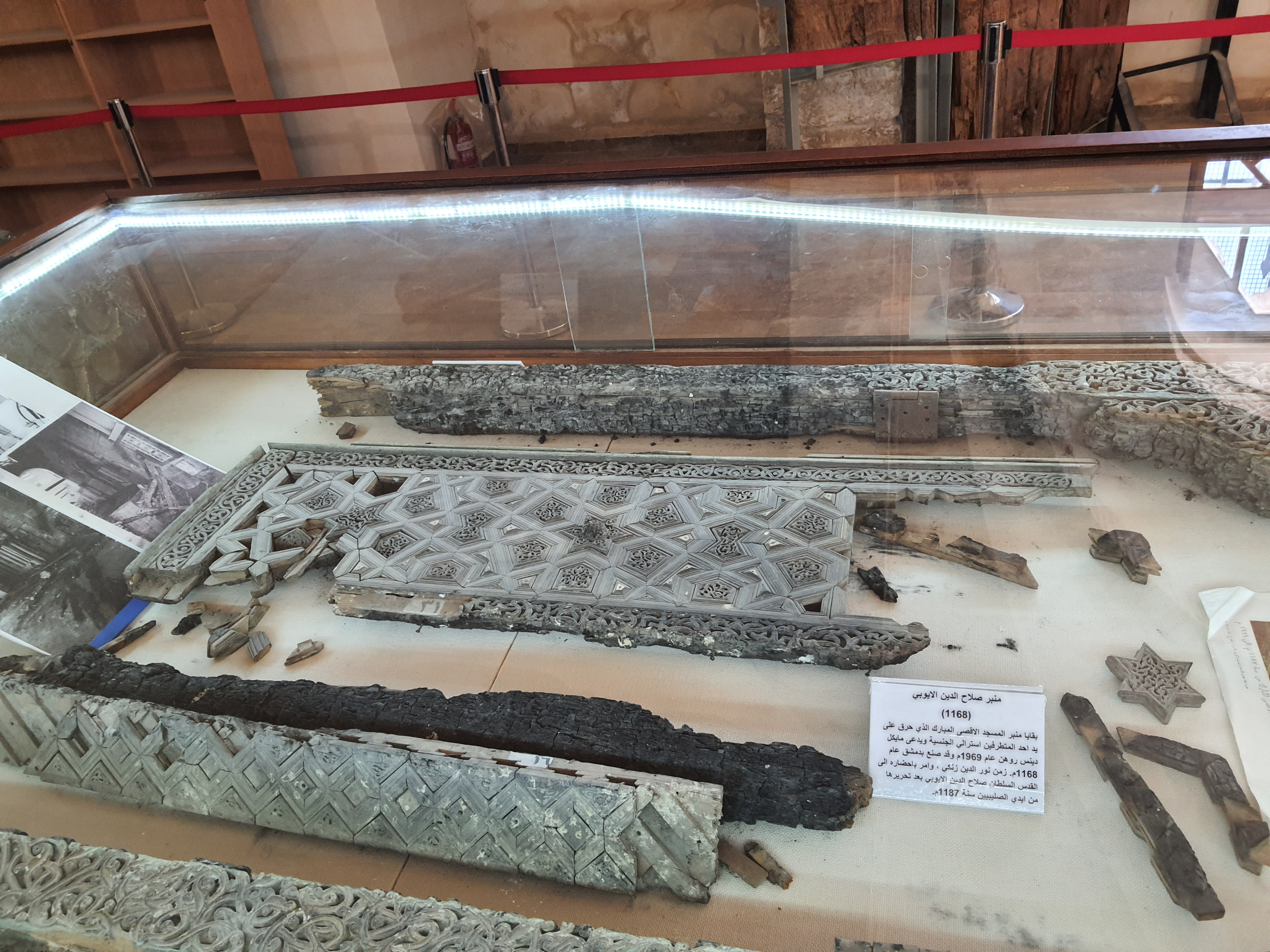
The remains of the original Saladin minbar after the 1969 arson attack by Rohan, it was reconstructed later in 2007

The minbar of the mosque was built by a craftsman named Akhtarini from Aleppo on the orders of the Zengid sultan Nur ad-Din. It was intended to be a gift for the mosque when Nur ad-Din would capture Jerusalem from the Crusaders and took six years to build (1168–74). Nur ad-Din died and the Crusaders still controlled Jerusalem, but in 1187, Saladin captured the city and the minbar was installed. The structure was made of ivory and carefully crafted wood. Arabic calligraphy, geometrical and floral designs were inscribed in the woodwork.

After its destruction by Rohan in 1969, it was replaced by a much simpler minbar. In January 2007, Adnan al-Husayni—head of the Islamic waqf in charge of al-Aqsa—stated that a new minbar would be installed; it was installed in February 2007. The design of the new minbar was drawn by Jamil Badran based on an exact replica of the Saladin Minbar and was finished by Badran within a period of five years. The minbar itself was built in Jordan over a period of four years and the craftsmen used "ancient woodworking methods, joining the pieces with pegs instead of nails, but employed computer images to design the pulpit [minbar]."

== Current situation ==
=== Administration ===
The administrative body responsible for the whole Al-Aqsa Mosque compound is known as "the Jerusalem Waqf", an organ of the Jordanian government.

The Jerusalem Waqf is responsible for administrative matters in the Al-Aqsa Mosque compound. Religious authority on the site, on the other hand, is the responsibility of the Grand Mufti of Jerusalem, appointed by the government of the State of Palestine.

After the 1969 arson attack, the waqf employed architects, technicians and craftsmen in a committee that carry out regular maintenance operations. The Islamic Movement in Israel and the waqf have attempted to increase Muslim control of the Temple Mount as a way of countering Israeli policies and the escalating presence of Israeli security forces around the site since the Second Intifada. Some activities included refurbishing abandoned structures and renovating.

Ownership of the al-Aqsa Mosque is a contentious issue in the Israel-Palestinian conflict. During the negotiations at the 2000 Camp David Summit, Palestinians demanded complete ownership of the mosque and other Islamic holy sites in East Jerusalem.

=== Access ===
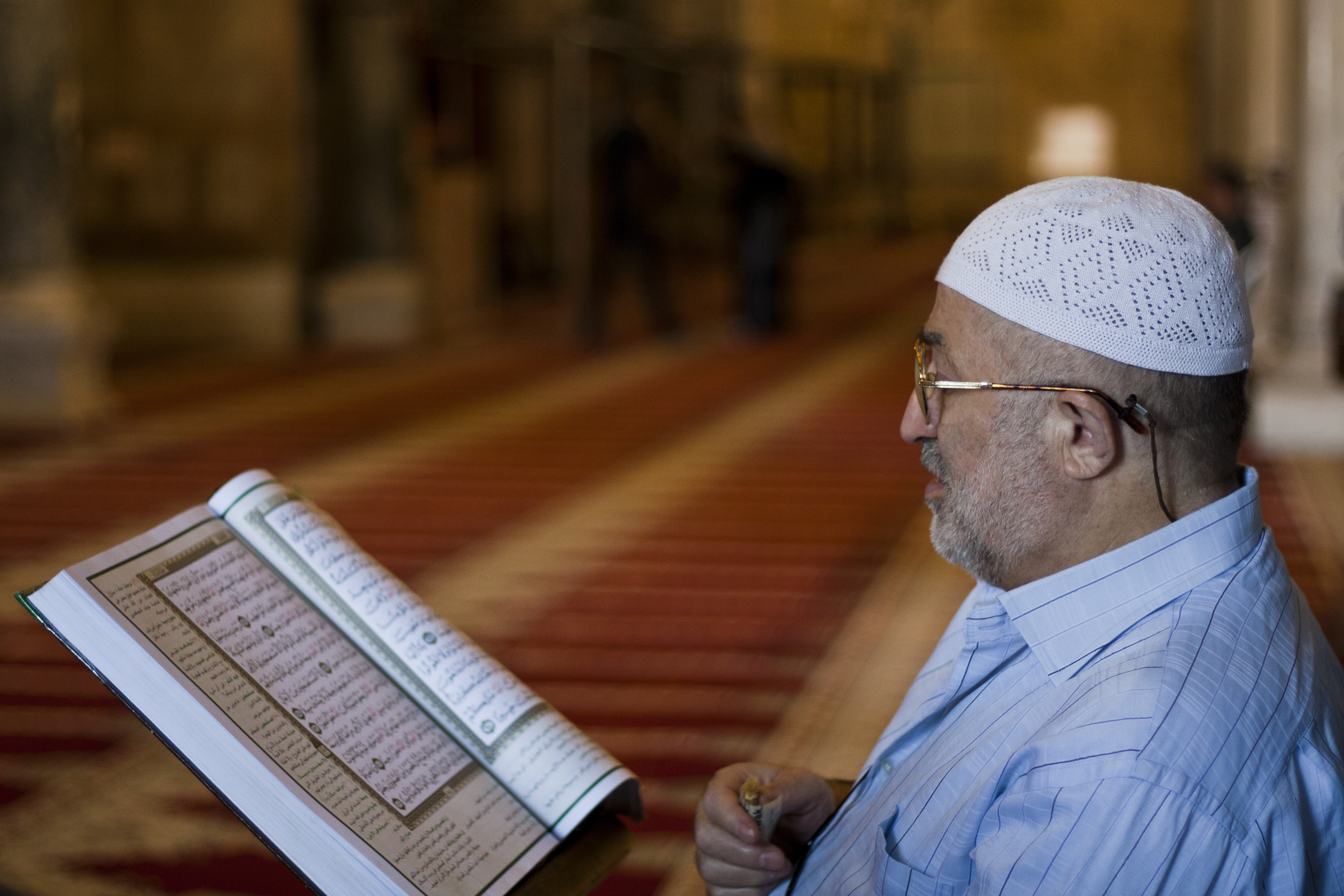
Palestinian Muslim man reading the Quran inside al-Aqsa Mosque

Muslims who are residents of Israel or visiting the country and Palestinians living in East Jerusalem are normally allowed to enter the Temple Mount and pray at al-Aqsa Mosque without restrictions. Due to security measures, the Israeli government occasionally prevents certain groups of Muslims from reaching al-Aqsa by blocking the entrances to the complex; the restrictions vary from time to time. At times, restrictions have prevented all men under 45, unmarried men under 50 and women under 45 from entering. Sometimes the restrictions are enforced on the occasion of Friday prayers, other times they are over an extended period of time. Restrictions are most severe for Gazans, followed by restrictions on those from West Bank. The Israeli government states that the restrictions are in place for security reasons.

Until 2000, non-Muslim visitors could enter the Aqsa Mosque by getting a ticket from the Waqf. That procedure ended when the Second Intifada began. Over two decades later, the Waqf still hopes negotiations between Israel and Jordan may result in allowing visitors to enter once again.

=== Excavations ===
Several excavations outside the Temple Mount took place following the 1967 War. In 1970, Israeli authorities commenced intensive excavations outside the walls next to the mosque on the southern and western sides. Palestinians believed that tunnels were being dug under the Aqsa Mosque in order to undermine its foundations, which was denied by Israelis, who claimed that the closest excavation to the mosque was some 70 meters (230 ft) to its south. The Archaeological Department of the Israeli Ministry of Religious Affairs dug a tunnel near the western portion of the mosque in 1984. According to UNESCO's special envoy to Jerusalem Oleg Grabar, buildings and structures on the Temple Mount are deteriorating due mostly to disputes between the Israeli, Palestinian and Jordanian governments over who is actually responsible for the site.

In February 2007, the department started to excavate a site for archaeological remains in a location where the government wanted to rebuild a collapsed pedestrian bridge leading to the Mughrabi Gate, the only entrance for non-Muslims into the Temple Mount complex. This site was 60 meters (200 ft) away from the mosque. The excavations provoked anger throughout the Islamic world, and Israel was accused of trying to destroy the foundation of the mosque. Ismail Haniyeh—then Prime Minister of the Palestinian National Authority and Hamas leader—called on Palestinians to unite to protest the excavations, while Fatah said they would end their ceasefire with Israel. Israel denied all charges against them, calling them "ludicrous".

=== Conflicts ===
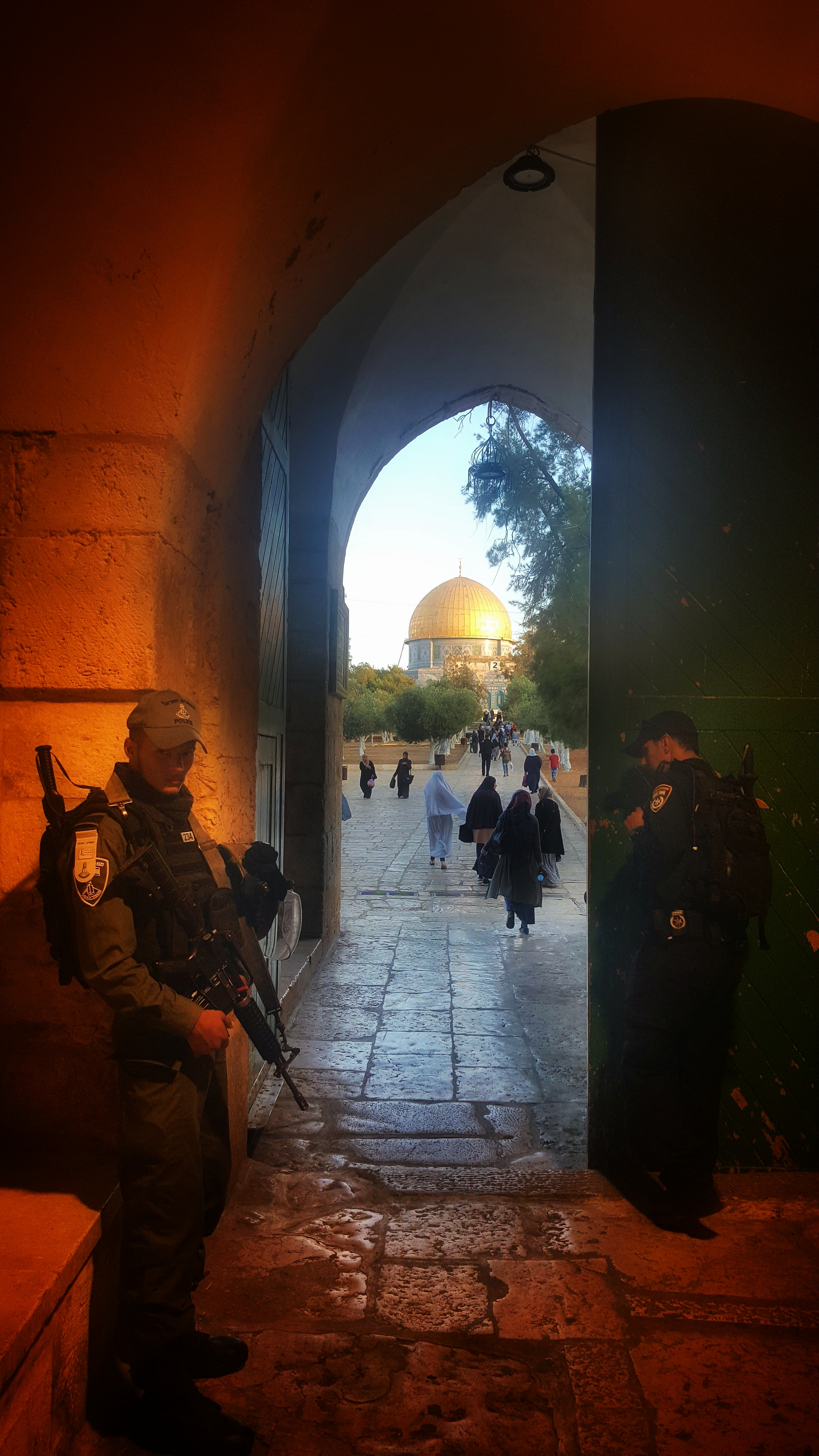
Israeli police at one of the entrances to the mosque.

In April 2021, during both Passover and Ramadan, the site was a focus of tension between Israeli settlers and Palestinians. Jewish settlers broke an agreement between Israel and Jordan and performed prayers and read from the Torah inside the compound, an area normally off limits to non-Muslims. On 14 April, Israeli police entered the area and forcibly cut wires to speakers in minarets around the mosque, silencing the call to prayer, claiming the sound was interfering with an event by the Israeli president at the Western Wall. On 16 April, seventy thousand Muslims prayed in the compound around the mosque, the largest gathering since the beginning of the COVID pandemic; police barred most from entering the structure itself. In May 2021, hundreds of Palestinians were injured following clashes in the compound after reports of Israel's intention to proceed to evict Palestinians from land claimed by Israeli settlers.

On 15 April 2022, Israeli forces entered the Temple Mount and used tear gas shells and sound bombs to disperse Palestinians who, they said, were throwing stones at policemen. Some Palestinians barricaded themselves inside the Al-Aqsa mosque, where they were detained by Israeli police. Over 150 people ended up injured and 400 arrested. On April 5, 2023, Israeli police raided the temple, saying "agitators" who had thrown stones and fired fireworks at the police, had barricaded themselves and worshippers inside. Following the incident, militants fired rockets from Gaza into southern Israel. On 22 April 2024 Israeli police arrested 13 for incitement to violence after they were caught in the act of smuggling goats onto the site for ritual sacrifice, 3 had been arrested in 2023 for trying to smuggle lambs and goats onto the site.

== See also ==
- List of mosques in Palestine
- Islam in Palestine
- List of the oldest mosques in the world
- Al-Juʽranah in Saudi Arabia, alternative location for Quranic "al-Aqsa mosque"
- Palestinian nationalism – Movement for self-determination and sovereignty of Palestine
- Religious significance of the Syrian region – Region east of the Mediterranean Sea
- High medieval domes
