= Al-Luqaimi =

Arab traveler from Egypt (1693–1765)

Mustafa As'ad al-Luqaimi, (Arabic: مصطفى أسعد اللقيمي, 1693-1765) was an Arab traveler born in Damietta, Egypt, whose family hailed from the village of Luqaim in Hejaz. He died in Damascus. He is known for his visit to Jerusalem which he chronicled in his book Mawāniḥ al-uns bi-riḥlatī li-Wādī al-Quds; in his work, he listed the many scholars and holy men buried in the neighborhood of Mamilla. During the visit, he joined the Sufi Khalwati order at the hands of its leader Mustafa ibn Kamal ad-Din al-Bakri.
