= Yoel Cohen =

British-Israeli scholar of mass communication

- Born: March 11, 1953 (age 73); London, United Kingdom
- Citizenship: Israeli–British
- Occupations: Academic, researcher
- Known for: Media diplomacy; religion and media; journalism studies
- Title: Professor Emeritus

Academic background
- Education: University College London; City, University of London

Academic work
- Institutions: Ariel University

Yoel Cohen (born 11 March 1953) is a British-born Israeli scholar of mass communication and Professor Emeritus at Ariel University, where he previously served as the head of the School of Communication. His research focuses on media diplomacy, political communication, and religion and media, with particular attention to journalism systems and state–media relations.

== Biography ==
Cohen was born in London, United Kingdom. He studied International Relations at University College London and completed a PhD at City, University of London, under the supervision of the media scholar, Professor Jeremy Tunstall. His doctoral research examined relations between the British Foreign Office and the media and formed the basis of his first book, Media Diplomacy (1986). His is an author with library classification registries.

He also studied Biblical and Talmudic literature at Jews’ College in London. In 1980, he moved to Israel, where he continued his academic career in communication studies and held research positions at Israeli academic institutions.

== Academic work ==
Cohen’s work spans two main areas within communication studies: political communication and religion and media. His research in political communication focuses on media diplomacy, foreign correspondence, and the interaction between government institutions and international press systems.

In parallel, his work on religion and media examines how religious communities and institutions are represented within journalistic systems and how media practices intersect with religious identity and authority.

== Reception ==
Cohen’s publications have been discussed in peer-reviewed journals in communication studies, journalism research, and Middle East studies.

His book God, Jews and the Media (2012) has been reviewed in international journals, including Israel Affairs and by the Jewish Book Council, with scholarly discussion focusing on its empirical contribution to the study of religious media systems and the intersection of secular and ultra-Orthodox media ecosystems.

Across his body of work, discussion has appeared in journals concerned with media ethics, political communication, and religion and society, reflecting the interdisciplinary nature of his research.

== Personal life ==
Cohen has been married to Sherif Ackerman since 1981, and the couple has four children. The family lives in Jerusalem.

== Selected works ==
=== Media and political communication ===
- Cohen, Yoel (1986). Media Diplomacy: The Foreign Office in the Mass Communications Age. Frank Cass. ISBN 9780714632698.
- Cohen, Yoel (1992). Nuclear Ambiguity: The Vanunu Affair. Sinclair-Stevenson. ISBN 9781856191500.
- Cohen, Yoel (2003). The Whistleblower of Dimona. Holmes & Meier. ISBN 9780841914285.
- Cohen, Yoel (2005). Whistleblowers and the Bomb: Vanunu, Israel and Nuclear Secrecy. Pluto Press. ISBN 978-0745322681.

=== Religion and media ===
- Cohen, Yoel (2012). God, Jews and the Media. Routledge. ISBN 9780415475037.
- Cohen, Yoel (2018). Spiritual News. Peter Lang. ISBN 9781433128639.
- Cohen, Yoel; Soukup, Paul A. (2023). Handbook of Religion & Communication. Wiley-Blackwell. ISBN 9781119671589.
- Cohen, Yoel (2023). Rabbis, Reporters and the Public in the Digital Holyland. Routledge. ISBN 978-1032156156.

=== Translations and editions ===
- Cohen, Yoel (2005). The Whistleblower from Dimona (in Hebrew). Babel Publishing. ISBN 9655171914.

== Synthesis of academic reception ==
The following table summarizes the scholarly positioning of Cohen’s major works based on their reception in peer-reviewed literature and the types of journals in which they are discussed.

Publication	Research domain	Citation context	Journal clustering
Media Diplomacy (1986)	Media diplomacy	Cited in studies of state–media relations	Political communication; international relations
Nuclear Ambiguity (1992)	Media & security	Discussed in media ethics and secrecy literature	Journalism ethics; security studies
The Whistleblower of Dimona (2003)	Whistleblowing	Referenced in investigative journalism studies	Journalism studies; Middle East studies
God, Jews and the Media (2012)	Religion and media	Cited in empirical religion-media research	Religion and communication studies
Spiritual News (2018)	Global religion journalism	Used in comparative media studies	Media sociology; religion and society
Handbook of Religion & Communication (2023)	Communication theory	Reference synthesis volume in the field	Interdisciplinary communication theory
