= 2021 Israel–Palestine crisis =

Part of the Israeli–Palestinian conflict

- Part of the Israeli–Palestinian conflict
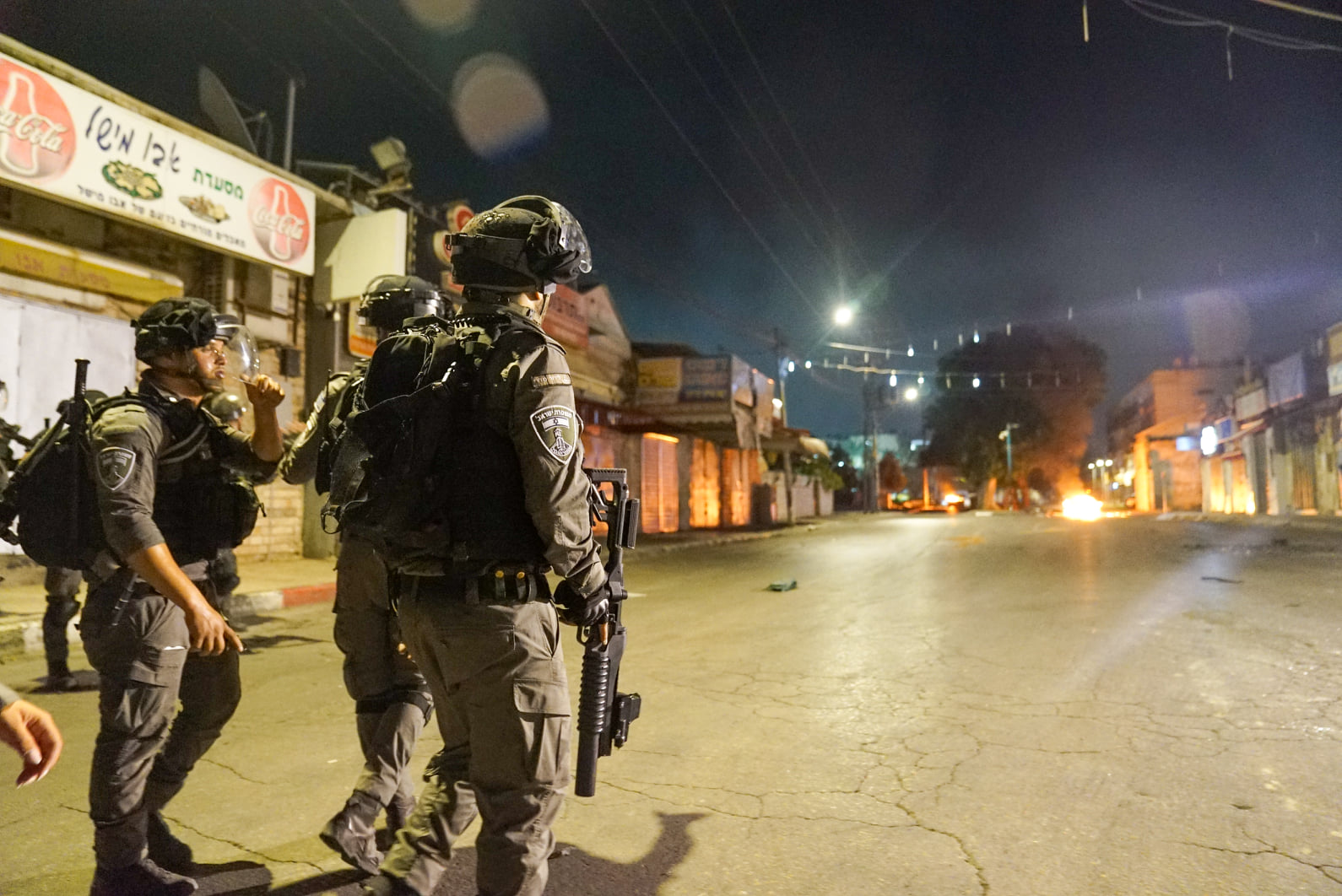
- Israeli police officers in Lod, Israel, 11 May
- Date: 6–21 May 2021 (2 weeks and 1 day)
- Location: Israel, Palestine, Israel–Lebanon border, Golan Heights
- Caused by: Planned decision by the Supreme Court of Israel on the eviction of four Palestinian families in the East Jerusalem neighborhood of Sheikh Jarrah; Storming of the al-Aqsa Mosque by Israeli police
- Result: Return to status quo ante bellum; ceasefire went into effect: Victory claimed by both sides; Halting of both Israeli airstrikes inside the Gaza Strip and Palestinian rocket fire into Israel

Parties
- Israel
  - Israel Defense Forces
    - Israeli Air Force
  - Ministry of National Security
    - Israel Police
      - Israel Border Police
  - Shin Bet
Jewish Israeli protesters
- Gaza Strip
  - Hamas
  - Palestinian Islamic Jihad
  - Popular Front for the Liberation of Palestine
  - Al-Aqsa Martyrs' Brigades
  - Smaller militant groups (Note: Besides Hamas and the Palestinian Islamic Jihad, FDD's Long War Journal identified the following militant groups as having fought in the 2021 conflict: Jihad Jibril Brigades, Humat al-Aqsa, Jaysh al-Ummah, Katibat al-Sheikh al-Emireen, Mujahideen Brigades, Abdul al-Qadir al-Husseini Brigades, and two al-Aqsa Martyrs Brigades splinter factions.)
Protesters in Israel and Palestine
- Arab Israeli protesters
- Palestinian protesters in the West Bank and Jerusalem
Jordanian, Lebanese, and Syrian protesters (see international)

Lead figures
(Israel) Benjamin Netanyahu; (Israel) Benny Gantz; (Israel) Aviv Kochavi; (Israel) Amikam Norkin; (Israel) Eli Sharvit; (Israel) Kobi Shabtai; (Israel) Nadav Argaman	Ismail Haniyeh; Yahya Sinwar; Saleh al-Arouri; Mohammed Deif; (Palestinian Islamic Jihad) Abd Al Aziz Awda; (Palestinian Islamic Jihad) Ziyad al-Nakhalah

Casualties and losses
Israel–Gaza conflict: 14 civilians killed (1 Indian, 2 Thai), 114 wounded 1 soldier killed, 3 wounded 1 aerial drone destroyed (friendly fire); Lod & Acre riots: 2 Jewish-Israelis killed West Bank: 2 soldiers wounded, 6 border police injured	Gaza Strip: 256 killed, 2,000 wounded (per UN); 128 civilians (per UN OHCHR); 80–200 militants killed (low est. per Hamas, high est. per Israel); 6 aerial and "several" underwater drones destroyed (per Israel); West Bank: 28 Palestinians killed 500+ Palestinians injured Lod riots: 1 Arab-Israeli protester killed East Jerusalem: 1,000 Palestinian protesters injured 23 protesters arrested Israeli–Lebanese border: 1 Hezbollah member and 1 Lebanese protester killed
- 72,000+ Palestinians displaced

A major outbreak of violence in the Israeli–Palestinian conflict, sometimes called the Unity Intifada, mainly commenced on 10 May 2021 and continued until a ceasefire came into effect on 21 May. It was marked by protests and police riot control, rocket attacks on Israel by Hamas and Palestinian Islamic Jihad (PIJ), and Israeli airstrikes in the Gaza Strip. The crisis was triggered on 6 May, when Palestinians in East Jerusalem began protesting over an anticipated decision of the Supreme Court of Israel on the eviction of six Palestinian families in the East Jerusalem neighborhood of Sheikh Jarrah. Under international law, the area, effectively annexed by Israel in 1980, is a part of the Israeli-occupied West Bank. On 7 May, according to Israel's Channel 12, Palestinians threw stones at Israeli police forces, who then stormed the Al-Aqsa Mosque compound using tear gas, rubber bullets, and stun grenades. The crisis prompted protests around the world as well as official reactions from world leaders.

The violence coincided with Qadr Night (8 May), observed by Muslims, and Jerusalem Day (9–10 May), an Israeli national holiday celebrating the occupation of East Jerusalem in 1967. The confrontations occurred ahead of a planned Jerusalem Day parade known as the Dance of Flags by far-right Jewish nationalists, which was later canceled. More than 600 people were injured, mostly Palestinians, drawing international condemnation. Israel's Supreme Court ruling on evictions from Sheikh Jarrah was then delayed for 30 days as Avichai Mandelblit, the erstwhile attorney general of Israel, sought to reduce tensions.

On the afternoon of 10 May, Hamas gave Israel an ultimatum to withdraw its security forces from both the Temple Mount complex and Sheikh Jarrah by 6 p.m. When the ultimatum expired without a response, both Hamas and PIJ launched rockets from the Gaza Strip into Israel; some of these rockets hit Israeli residences and a school. Israel then began a campaign of airstrikes against Gaza; by 16 May, some 950 targets had been attacked, demolishing completely or partially 18 buildings, including four high-rise towers, 40 schools and four hospitals, while also striking the al-Shati refugee camp. Additionally, at least 19 medical facilities were damaged or destroyed by the Israeli bombardment. By 17 May, the United Nations estimated that Israeli airstrikes had destroyed 94 buildings in Gaza, comprising 461 housing and commercial units, including the al-Jalaa Highrise; housing offices of the Associated Press, the Al Jazeera Media Network, and other news outlets; and 60 condominiums.

As a result of the violence, at least 256 Palestinians, including 66 children, were killed (including at least seven from friendly fire). In Israel, at least 13 people were killed, including two children. The Gaza Ministry of Health reported that more than 1,900 Palestinians were injured, and as of 12 May, at least 200 Israelis were reported to have been injured. As of 19 May, at least 72,000 Palestinians have been displaced. Around 4,360 Palestinian rockets were fired towards Israel, of which 680 landed within the Gaza Strip, and over 90 percent of rockets bound towards populated areas were intercepted by Israel's Iron Dome. Israel conducted around 1,500 aerial, land, and sea strikes on the Gaza Strip. Calls for a ceasefire were first proposed on 13 May by Hamas, but rejected by Israeli prime minister Benjamin Netanyahu. On 18 May, France, along with Egypt and Jordan, announced the filing of a United Nations Security Council resolution for a ceasefire. Egypt mediated a ceasefire between Israel and Hamas, which came into effect on 21 May 2021, ending 11 days of fighting in which both sides claimed victory. On 16 June 2021, incendiary balloons were launched from Gaza into Israel, which the Israeli Air Force responded to with multiple airstrikes in the Gaza Strip, resuming the fighting.

== Background ==
=== April–May 2021 Ramadan events ===
At the beginning of the Muslim holy month of Ramadan in 2021, Jerusalem Islamic Waqf officials said that on the night of 13 April, the Israeli police entered the Al-Aqsa Mosque compound and severed the loudspeaker cables used to broadcast the muezzin's ritual call to prayer so that the Memorial Day speech being delivered by President Reuven Rivlin below at the Western Wall would not be disturbed. Israeli police declined to comment. The incident was condemned by Jordan, and the Palestinian National Authority President Mahmoud Abbas called the incident "a racist hate crime", but it did not draw other international attention. In the same month, Israeli police closed the staired plaza outside the Old City's Damascus Gate, a traditional holiday gathering spot for Palestinians. The closure triggered violent night clashes, the barricades were removed after several days. On 15 April, a TikTok video of a Palestinian teen slapping an ultra-orthodox Jewish man went viral, leading to several copycat incidents. The next day, tens of thousands of Palestinian worshippers were turned away from al-Aqsa, on the first Friday of Ramadan when Israel imposed a 10,000-person limit on prayers at the mosque. On the same day, a rabbi was beaten in Jaffa, causing two days of protests. On 22 April, the far-right Jewish supremacist group Lehava held a march through Jerusalem chanting "death to Arabs." On 23 April, after fringe military groups fired 36 rockets at southern Israel, the IDF launched missiles at Hamas targets in the Gaza Strip. The barrage of rocket fire came as hundreds of Palestinians clashed with Israeli police in East Jerusalem and on 25 April, the United Nations envoy Tor Wennesland condemned the violence and said, "The provocative acts across Jerusalem must cease. The indiscriminate launching of rockets towards Israeli population centers violates international law and must stop immediately." On 26 April, after more than 40 rockets have been launched from the Gaza Strip into Israel while one projectile exploded inside the Gaza Strip over of the previous three days, the Security Cabinet of Israel voted in favor after an hours-long debate of an operational plan to strike Hamas if rocket fire from Gaza continues. In the following days, a Palestinian boy and a 19-year-old Israeli settler were killed. On 6 May, the Israel Police shot and killed a 16-year-old Palestinian during a raid of Nablus in the West Bank. According to Addameer, Israeli police arrested at least 61 children from mid-April during clashes in and about East Jerusalem, and 4 were shot dead in three weeks.

Itamar Ben-Gvir visited Sheikh Jarrah shortly before the clashes began, where he said that the houses belonged to Jews and told police to "open fire" on protesters. Agence France-Presse reported that Israeli settlers had been seen in Sheikh Jarrah openly carrying assault rifles and revolvers leading up to the clashes. According to author Ramzy Baroud, a video was posted of Ben-Gvir, in a joking exchange with the deputy mayor of Jerusalem, Arieh King, mocking a Palestinian resident shot by Israeli police during a protest.

=== Sheikh Jarrah controversy ===
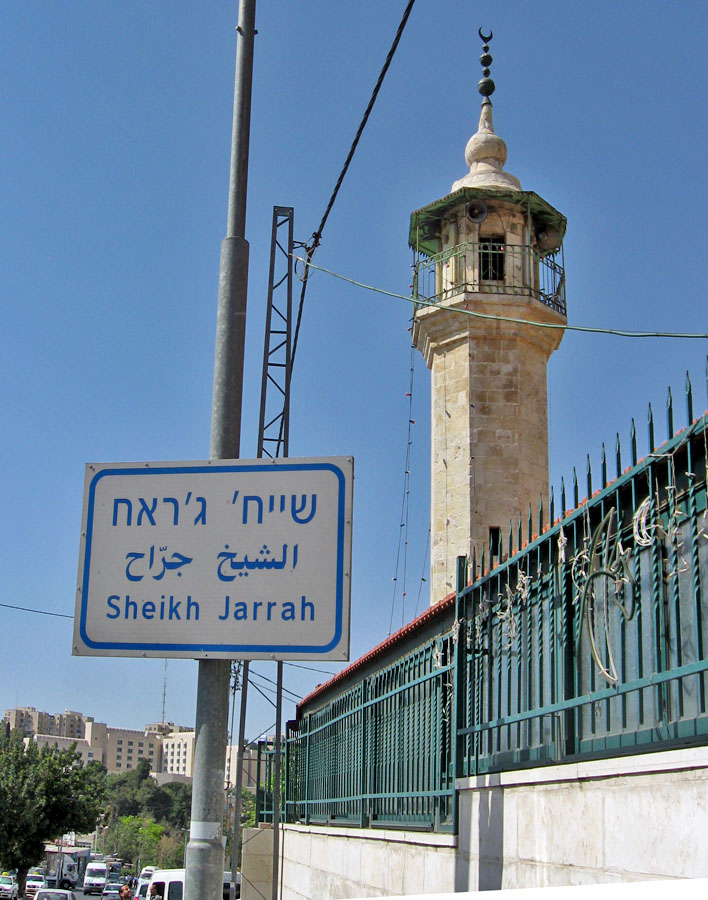
Entrance to the Sheikh Jarrah neighborhood

The Sheikh Jarrah district houses the descendants of refugees expelled or displaced from their homes in Jaffa and Haifa in the Nakba of 1948. Today, around 75 Palestinian families live on this disputed land. The long-running dispute over land ownership in Sheikh Jarrah is considered a microcosm of the Israeli–Palestinian disputes over land since 1948. Currently, more than 1,000 Palestinians living across East Jerusalem face possible eviction. Israeli law allows Israeli land owners to file claims over land in East Jerusalem which they have owned prior to 1948, except where expropriated by the Jordanian government, but rejects Palestinian claims over land in Israel which they owned. The international community considers East Jerusalem to be Palestinian territory held under Israeli occupation and the Office of the United Nations High Commissioner for Human Rights (OHCHR) has called on Israel to stop all forced evictions of Palestinians from Sheikh Jarrah, saying that if carried out the expulsions of the Palestinians would violate Israel's responsibilities under international law which prohibit the transfer of civilians in to or out of occupied territory by the occupying power. A spokesman for the OHCHR said that such transfers may constitute a "war crime". Human rights organizations have been critical of Israeli efforts to remove Palestinians from Sheikh Jarrah, with Human Rights Watch releasing a statement saying that the disparate rights between Palestinian and Jewish residents of East Jerusalem "underscores the reality of apartheid that Palestinians in East Jerusalem face." Israeli human rights group estimate that over 1,000 Palestinian families are at risk of eviction in East Jerusalem.

A Jewish trust bought the land in Sheikh Jarrah from Arab landowners in the 1870s in Ottoman Palestine. However, the purchase is disputed by some Palestinians, who have produced Ottoman-era land titles for part of the land. The land came under Jordanian control following the 1948 Arab–Israeli War. Following the war, Jewish residents were expelled from East Jerusalem, and Palestinians from Israel. In 1956, the Jordanian government, in cooperation with the United Nations' organization for refugees, housed 28 of these Palestinian families on land owned by Jewish trusts. After the Six-Day War the area fell under Israeli occupation. In 1970, Israel passed a law that allowed previous owners to reclaim property in East Jerusalem that had been taken by Jordan without having ownership transferred. Under this law, in 1972, the Israeli Custodian General registered the properties under the Jewish trusts which claimed to be the rightful owners of the land. In 1982, an agreement was endorsed by the courts which the families later said had been made without their knowledge and disputed the original ownership claims by the Jewish trusts. (Note: "In 1982, the two Jewish Committees filed a lawsuit against 23 of these Palestinian families. An Israeli attorney Toussia-Cohen, who represented 17 of the families, reached an agreement with the two Jewish Committees, that the families would stay in the properties as protected tenants, but in return would recognise the two Jewish Committees' ownership claims. As such, the families have been required to pay rent to the two Jewish Committees and comply with strict regulation on their ability to renovate or change the property. The Israeli lawyer concluded the agreement with the two Jewish Committees without the families' consent, and without challenging or scrutinising the validity of the ownership claims. The agreement was sanctioned by the Jerusalem District Court and formed the basis for eviction lawsuits of the 28 refugee families, who have refused to pay rent to the Jewish Committees, despite the fact that not all families are part of the Toussia-Cohen Agreement and the fact that the families who are part of the agreement dispute that their consent was given to the Israeli lawyer." "Israeli courts have not ruled conclusively on the ownership of the land; the families were evicted on the grounds of non-compliance with a 1982 lease agreement which their Israeli lawyer concluded at the time with the settler groups without their consent.") These challenges were rejected by Israeli courts. The trusts then demanded that the tenants pay rent. Eviction orders began to be issued in the 1990s. Palestinian tenants say that Israeli courts have no jurisdiction in the area since the land is outside Israel's recognized borders; this view is supported by the UN Human Rights Office.

OCHAoPT map of Palestinian communities under threat of eviction in East Jerusalem, as of 2016

In 2003, the Jewish trusts sold the homes to a right-wing settler organization, which then made repeated attempts to evict the Palestinian residents. The company has submitted plans to build more than 200 housing units, which have not yet been approved by the government. These groups succeeded in evicting 43 Palestinians from the area in 2002, and three more families since then. In 2010, the Supreme Court of Israel rejected an appeal by Palestinian families who had resided in 57 housing units in the area of Sheikh Jarrah, who had petitioned the court to have their ownership to the properties recognized. An Israeli court had previously ruled that the Palestinians could remain on the properties under a legal status called "protected tenants", but had to pay rent. The move to evict them came after they refused to pay rent and carried out construction. In 2021 Israel's Supreme Court was expected to deliver a ruling on whether to uphold the eviction of six Palestinian families from the Sheikh Jarrah neighborhood on 10 May 2021, after a court ruled that 13 families comprising 58 people had to vacate the properties by 1 August. On 9 May 2021, the Israeli Supreme Court delayed the expected decision on evictions for 30 days, after an intervention from Attorney General of Israel Avichai Mandelblit. On 26 May 2021, the court ordered Mandelblit to submit his legal opinion on the matter within two weeks. In a related case, the Jerusalem District Court is holding a hearing on appeals filed on behalf of seven families subject of eviction orders from the Batan al-Hawa section of Silwan. According to Haaretz, Mandelblit notified the court on 7 June that he would decline to present a view on the case; a new hearing date of 2 August was set.

According to the Jerusalem Institute for Policy Research, this approach to property rights is unacceptable in international law. The Jerusalem-based non-profit organization B'Tselem and the international Human Rights Watch cited discriminatory policies in East Jerusalem in recent reports, alleging that Israel is guilty of the crime of apartheid. Israel rejected the allegations. East Jerusalem is effectively annexed by Israel, and Israel applies its laws there. According to the Office of the United Nations High Commissioner for Human Rights, the area is a part of the Palestinian territories that Israel currently occupies. United States secretary of state Antony Blinken warned Israel that evicting Palestinian families from their homes in East Jerusalem is among the actions by both sides that could lead to "conflict and war."

=== Political instability ===
The 2021 Palestinian legislative election for the Palestinian Legislative Council, originally scheduled for 22 May 2021, was indefinitely postponed on 29 April by President Mahmoud Abbas. Hamas, which was expected to do well in the elections, called the move a "coup", and some Palestinians believed Abbas had delayed the election to avoid political defeat for his party Fatah. Analysts say the postponement contributed towards the current crisis, and encouraged Hamas to resort to military confrontation rather than diplomatic tactics. Opinion pieces in NBC News, The Wall Street Journal and Foreign Policy argued that by taking responsibility for the rocket fire, Hamas had improved its standing among Palestinians wary of the delayed elections.

In Israel, a political crisis saw four inconclusive elections since 2019, which left Israel functioning under a caretaker government. Prime Minister Benjamin Netanyahu was trying to persuade several extreme-right politicians to form a coalition. The presence of right-wing Israeli politicians Ben-Gvir and King contributed to the crisis. The New York Times said Netanyahu was trying to instigate a crisis to build support for his leadership, and thus allowed tensions to rise in Jerusalem. An article in The Conversation dismissed this as "conspiratorial", arguing that although the crisis has given Netanyahu a political opportunity, he "was not looking or hoping for a major conflict with the Palestinians to help him hold onto power".

== Escalation ==
Palestinian protests began on 6 May in Sheikh Jarrah, but clashes soon spread to the al-Aqsa Mosque, Lod, other Arab localities in Israel, and the West Bank. Between 10 and 14 May Israeli security inflicted injuries on approximately 1,000 Palestinian protesters in East Jerusalem.

=== Sheikh Jarrah ===
Palestinians and Israeli settlers first clashed on 6 May in Sheikh Jarrah, where Palestinian families are at risk of being evicted. Palestinian protesters had been holding nightly outdoor iftars. On 6 May, Israeli settlers and members of the far-right political party Otzma Yehudit set up a table across the street from Palestinians. Social media videos showed both sides hurling rocks and chairs at each other. Israeli police intervened and arrested at least 7 people. Israeli police subsequently engaged in extensive spraying of Sheikh Jarrah's Palestinian homes, shops, restaurants, public spaces and cultural institutions with Skunk, a lasting stench used to contain protests.

=== Al-Aqsa Mosque compound ===
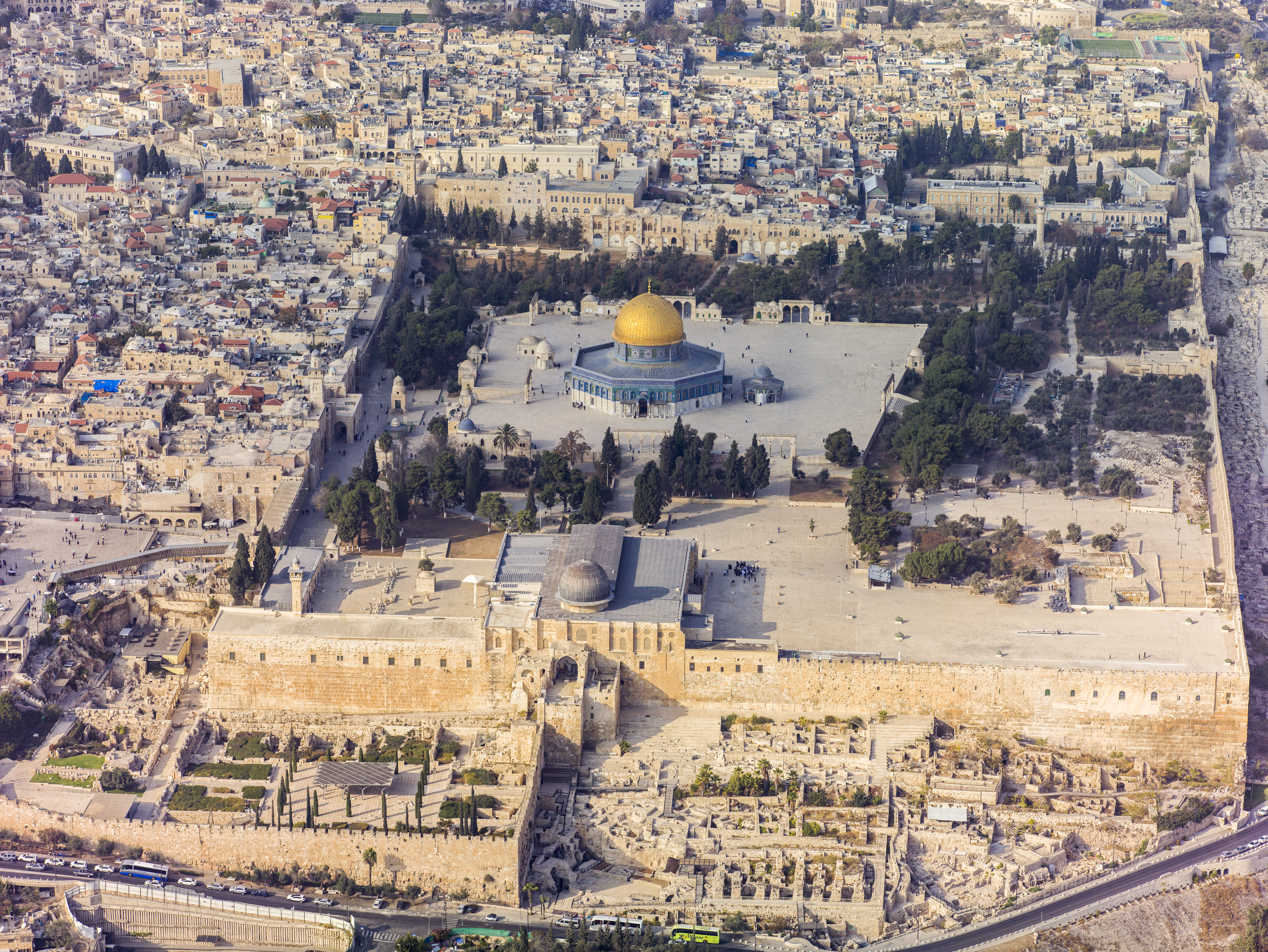
Aerial photograph of Masjid Al Aqsa, the site of some of the clashes

On 7 May, large numbers of police were deployed on the Temple Mount as around 70,000 worshippers attended the final Friday prayers of Ramadan at al-Aqsa.The Israeli police said that some protestors had thrown stones and fireworks at them; however, it was unclear what sparked the violence. Police officers fired stun grenades into the mosque compound and into a field clinic. A mosque spokesman stated the clashes broke out after Israeli police attempted to evacuate the compound, where many Palestinians sleep over in Ramadan, adding that the evacuation was intended to allow access to Israelis. More than 300 Palestinians were wounded as Israeli police stormed the mosque compound. Palestinians threw rocks, firecrackers, and heavy objects, while Israeli police fired stun grenades, tear gas, and rubber bullets at worshippers. The storming came ahead of a Jerusalem Day flag march by Jewish nationalists through the Old City. More than 600 Palestinians were injured, more than 400 of whom were hospitalised. Militants in Gaza fired rockets into Israel the following night.

More clashes occurred on 8 May, the date of the Islamic holy night of Laylat al-Qadr. Palestinian crowds threw stones, lit fires, and chanted "Strike Tel Aviv" and "In spirit and in blood, we will redeem al-Aqsa", which The Times of Israel described as in support of Hamas. The Israel Police, wearing riot gear and some on horseback, used stun grenades and water cannons. At least 80 people were injured.

On 10 May, Israeli police stormed al-Aqsa for the second time, injuring 300 Palestinians and 21 Israeli police. According to the Red Crescent, 250 Palestinians were hospitalized for injuries and seven were in critical condition.

Also on 10 May, a video showing a tree burning near al-Aqsa began to circulate on social media. Below in the Western plaza, a crowd of Jewish Israelis was singing and dancing in celebration of Jerusalem Day. Yair Wallach accused them of singing "genocidal songs of vengeance." The crowd cheered the flames with words from a song from Judges 16:28 in which Samson cries out before he tears down the pillars in Gaza, "O God, that I may with one blow take vengeance on the Philistines for my two eyes!" Witnesses differed as to whether the fire was caused by an Israeli police stun grenade or by fireworks thrown by Palestinian protesters. Although the fire happened just 10 meters away from al-Aqsa, there was no damage to the mosque.

=== West Bank ===
Map of the West Bank, May 2021, showing Palestinian (green) and Israeli control.

After Friday prayers on 14 May, Palestinians protested in more than 200 locations in the West Bank. Protesters hurled stones and Israeli soldiers responded with live fire and tear gas. As a result, 11 Palestinians were killed at the protests. IDF troops shot a Palestinian man who they claim attempted to stab a soldier, the Palestinian survived; no Israeli soldiers were wounded in the incident. IDF forces injured more than 100 Palestinians. There have been daily demonstrations since the escalation in Gaza. As of 14 May, Israeli troops had killed a total of 11 Palestinians had been killed in the West Bank. On 17 May, three Palestinian demonstrators were killed in clashes with the IDF.

According to Al Arabiya, Fatah has backed a call for a general strike on 18 May in the West Bank, including East Jerusalem. Palestinians in Israel have been asked to take part. In an unusual display of unity by "Palestinian citizens of Israel, who make up 20% of its population, and those in the territories Israel seized in 1967" (Note: Pro-Palestinian activists have dubbed the May 2021 Palestinian reaction to Israeli policies in Sheikh Jarrah and the Al-Aqsa compound as the "Unity Intifada." The term denotes the national solidarity and religious duty shared by the resisting Palestinians in Gaza, the West Bank, Eastern Jerusalem, and Israel.) the strike went ahead and "shops were shuttered across cities in Gaza, the occupied West Bank and in villages and towns inside Israel". During the day of protests and strikes, a Palestinian man was killed and more than 70 wounded in clashes near Ramallah and two Israeli soldiers were injured in a shooting attack. Large crowds also gathered in Nablus, Bethlehem and Hebron while police deployed water cannons in Sheikh Jarrah.

=== Arab communities in Israel ===
During the evening and night of 10 May, Arab rioters in Lod threw stones and firebombs at Jewish homes, a school, and a synagogue, later attacking a hospital. Shots were fired at the rioters, killing one and wounding two; a Jewish suspect in the shooting was arrested.

Widespread protests and riots intensified across Israel, particularly in cities with large Arab populations. In Lod, Arab rioters threw rocks and firebombs at Jewish apartments, set fires, tore down street signs, set five synagogues on fire, and attacked a school, a pre-army military academy, and city hall. They also raised Palestinian and Hamas flags and called to "liberate Palestine." A Jewish man, Yigal Yehoshua, was critically wounded after being struck in the head by a brick and died six days later. The violence led to some Jewish residents being evacuated from their homes by police. Armed Jewish residents killed one Arab man, Musa Hassuna, and wounded two others. Police later accepted Hassuna's shooting as an act of self-defense amid the riots. A Muslim cemetery was also vandalized. In Acre, the Effendi hotel was torched by Arab rioters, injuring several guests. One of them, Avi Har-Even, a former head of the Israel Space Agency, suffered burns and smoke inhalation, and died on 6 June. In the nearby city of Ramle, Jewish rioters threw rocks at passing vehicles. On 11 May, Mayor of Lod Yair Revivio urged Prime Minister of Israel Benjamin Netanyahu to deploy the Israel Border Police to the city, stating that the municipality had "completely lost control" and warning that the country was on the brink of "civil war". Netanyahu declared a state of emergency in Lod on 11 May, marking the first time since 1966 that Israel has used emergency powers over an Arab community. Border Police forces were deployed to the city. A nighttime curfew was declared and entry to the city was prohibited for non-resident civilians. Minister of Public Security Amir Ohana announced the implementation of emergency orders.

Rioters attack a bus in Jerusalem, 19 May

Unrest continued on 12 May. In Acre, a Jewish man was attacked and injured by Arab Israeli protesters armed with sticks and stones while he was driving his car. In Bat Yam, Jewish extremists attacked Arab stores and beat pedestrians. An Arab motorist was pulled from his car and severely beaten in the street. The incident was caught live by an Israeli news crew.

As of 13 May, communal violence including "riots, stabbings, arson, attempted home invasions and shootings" was reported from Beersheba, Rahat, Ramla, Lod, Nasiriyah, Tiberias, Jerusalem, Haifa and Acre. An Israeli soldier was severely beaten in Jaffa and hospitalized for a skull fracture and cerebral hemorrhage, a Jewish paramedic and another Jewish man were shot in separate incidents in Lod, a police officer was shot in Ramla, Israeli journalists were attacked by far-right rioters in Tel Aviv, and a Jewish family that mistakenly drove into Umm al-Fahm was attacked by an Arab mob before being rescued by other local residents and police. Israel Border Police forces were deployed throughout the country to quell the unrest, and 10 Border Police reserve companies were called up. In an address to police in Lod, Prime Minister Netanyahu told them not to worry about future commissions of inquiry and investigations into their enforcement during the riots, reminding them of the way the police had suppressed the Palestinian Land Day riots of 1976.

By 17 May, the rioting had mostly died down. However, on 18 May, Israeli-Arabs, together with Palestinians in the West Bank and Gaza Strip, held a general strike in protest against Israeli policies toward Palestinians. Numerous employers threatened to fire Arab workers who participated in the strike. The management of Rambam Hospital in Haifa sent letters to their Arab employees warning against participating in the strike, and the Ministry of Education came under heavy criticism from teachers throughout Israel after it sent requests to the principals of schools in Arab towns asking for a list of teachers who participated in the strike. There were some instances of employees who participated in the strike being unlawfully dismissed without a prior hearing as required under Israeli law. The Israeli telecommunications company Cellcom paused work for an hour as an act in support of coexistence. The move led to calls for a boycott of Cellcom among Israeli right-wingers who accused it of showing solidarity with the strike, and several Jewish settlement councils and right-wing organizations cut ties with it. Cellcom's stock subsequently dropped by two percent.

Israel Police arrest men accused of rioting in the Negev

Throughout the riots, Arab rioters set 10 synagogues and 112 Jewish homes on fire, looted 386 Jewish homes and damaged another 673, and set 849 Jewish cars on fire. There were also 5,018 recorded instances of stone-throwing against Jews. By contrast, Jewish rioters damaged 13 Arab homes and set 13 Arab cars on fire, and there were 41 recorded instances of stone-throwing against Arabs. One Arab home was set on fire by Arab rioters who mistook it for a Jewish home. No mosques were set on fire and no Arab homes were reported looted during the unrest. By 19 May, 1,319 people had been arrested for participating in the riots, of whom 159 were Jewish, and 170 people had been criminally charged over the riots, of whom 155 were Arab and 15 Jewish. On 23 May, it was reported that 10% of those arrested over the riots were Jews, with the vast majority of those arrested being Arabs. On 24 May, the police launched a sweeping operation to arrest rioters called Operation Law and Order, deploying thousands of police officers to carry out mass arrests of suspected rioters. By 25 May, over 1,550 people had been arrested. On 3 June, the police announced the completion of arrests. Of the 2,142 arrested, 91% were Arab. As of May 2022, around 90% of 600 people indicted over the rioting were Arabs. Seven men, five Lod residents and two West Bank Palestinians who had been in Israel illegally, were indicted on murder, terrorism, and racism charges over the death of Yigal Yehoshua. Another seven suspects were indicted for arson and rioting over the burning of the Effendi hotel, but none were charged with homicide over the subsequent death of Avi Har-Even, as the fire's short duration and limited area within the hotel affected made it difficult for prosecutors to connect it to Har-Even's death. Three Jews were indicted for attempted terrorist murder over the beating of an Arab man in Bat Yam.

In November 2022, an Arab-Israeli man was sentenced to 10 years in prison for participation in a mob assault on a Jewish man. Another Arab-Israeli man was sentenced to 17 years in prison for his role in the same assault in November 2023.

According to Amnesty International, most of the arrests of Israeli-Arabs were for "insulting or assaulting a police officer" or "taking part in an illegal gathering" while right-wing Jewish extremists were mainly able to organize freely. The organization claimed that a "catalogue of violations" was committed by Israeli police against Palestinians in Israel and occupied East Jerusalem. "On at least two occasions in Haifa and Nazareth, witness accounts and verified videos showed police attacking groups of unarmed protesters without provocation", Amnesty reported.

=== Gaza ===
Hamas delivered an ultimatum to Israel to remove all its police and military personnel from both the Haram al Sharif mosque site and Sheikh Jarrah by 10 May 6 p.m. If it failed to do so, they announced that the combined militias of the Gaza Strip ("joint operations room") would strike Israel. Minutes after the deadline passed, Hamas fired more than 150 rockets into Israel from Gaza. The Israel Defense Forces (IDF) said that seven rockets were fired toward Jerusalem and Beit Shemesh and that one was intercepted. An anti-tank missile was also fired at an Israeli civilian vehicle, injuring the driver. Israel launched air strikes in the Gaza Strip on the same day. Hamas and Palestinian Islamic Jihad called the ensuing conflict the "Sword of Jerusalem Battle" (Arabic: معركة سيف القدس). The following day, the IDF officially dubbed the campaign in the Gaza Strip "Operation Guardian of the Walls."

On 11 May, Hamas and Palestinian Islamic Jihad launched hundreds of rockets at Ashdod and Ashkelon, killing two people and wounding more than 90 others. A third Israeli woman from Rishon LeZion was also killed, while two more civilians from Dahmash were killed by a rocket attack.

On 11 May, the 13-story residential Hanadi Tower in Gaza collapsed after being hit by an Israeli airstrike. The tower housed a mix of residential apartments and commercial offices. IDF said the building contained offices used by Hamas, and said it gave "advance warning to civilians in the building and provided sufficient time for them to evacuate the site"; Hamas and Palestinian Islamic Jihad fired 137 rockets at Tel Aviv in five minutes. Hamas stated that they fired their "largest ever barrage." In addition, an Israeli state-owned oil pipeline was hit by a rocket.

Israeli bombing of the Gaza Strip, 12 May

On 12 May, the Israeli Air Force destroyed dozens of police and security installations along the Gaza Strip; Hamas said its police headquarters were among the targets destroyed. Over 850 rockets were launched from Gaza into Israel on 12 May. According to the IDF, at least 200 rockets launched by Hamas failed to reach Israel, and fell inside the Gaza Strip. Hamas also struck an Israeli military jeep near the Gaza border with an anti-tank missile. An Israeli soldier was killed and three others were wounded in the attack.

IDF operations in Gaza on 14 May

On 13 May, Israeli forces and militant groups in Gaza continued to exchange artillery fire and airstrikes. Hamas attempted to deploy suicide drones against Israeli targets, with an Israeli F-16 engaging and shooting down one such drone. The Iron Dome intercepted many of the rockets fired at Israel. A series of Israeli strikes targeted the headquarters of Hamas' internal security forces, its central bank, and the home of a senior Hamas commander. On 14 May, Israel Defense Forces claimed to have troops on the ground and in the air attacking the Gaza Strip, although this claim was later retracted and followed with an apology for misleading the press. Israeli troops were reportedly told that they would be sent into Gaza and ground forces were reportedly positioned along the border as though they were preparing to launch an invasion. That same day, the Israeli Air Force launched a massive bombardment of Hamas' extensive underground tunnel network, which was known as "the metro", as well as above-ground positions, reportedly inflicting heavy casualties. It was suspected that the reports of an Israeli ground invasion had been a deliberate ruse to lure Hamas operatives into the tunnels and prepared positions above ground to confront Israeli ground forces so that large numbers could then be killed by airstrikes. According to an Israeli official, the attacks killed hundreds of Hamas personnel, and in addition, 20 Hamas commanders were assassinated and most of its rocket production capabilities were destroyed. However, the estimated Hamas death toll was revised to dozens, as information came out that senior Hamas commanders had doubted that the ruse was genuine and only a few dozen Hamas fighters took positions in the tunnels. In total, 160 Israeli Air Force aircraft fired 450 missiles at 150 targets, with the attacks lasting about 40 minutes. Also on 14 May, a Hamas drone was downed by Israeli air defense forces.

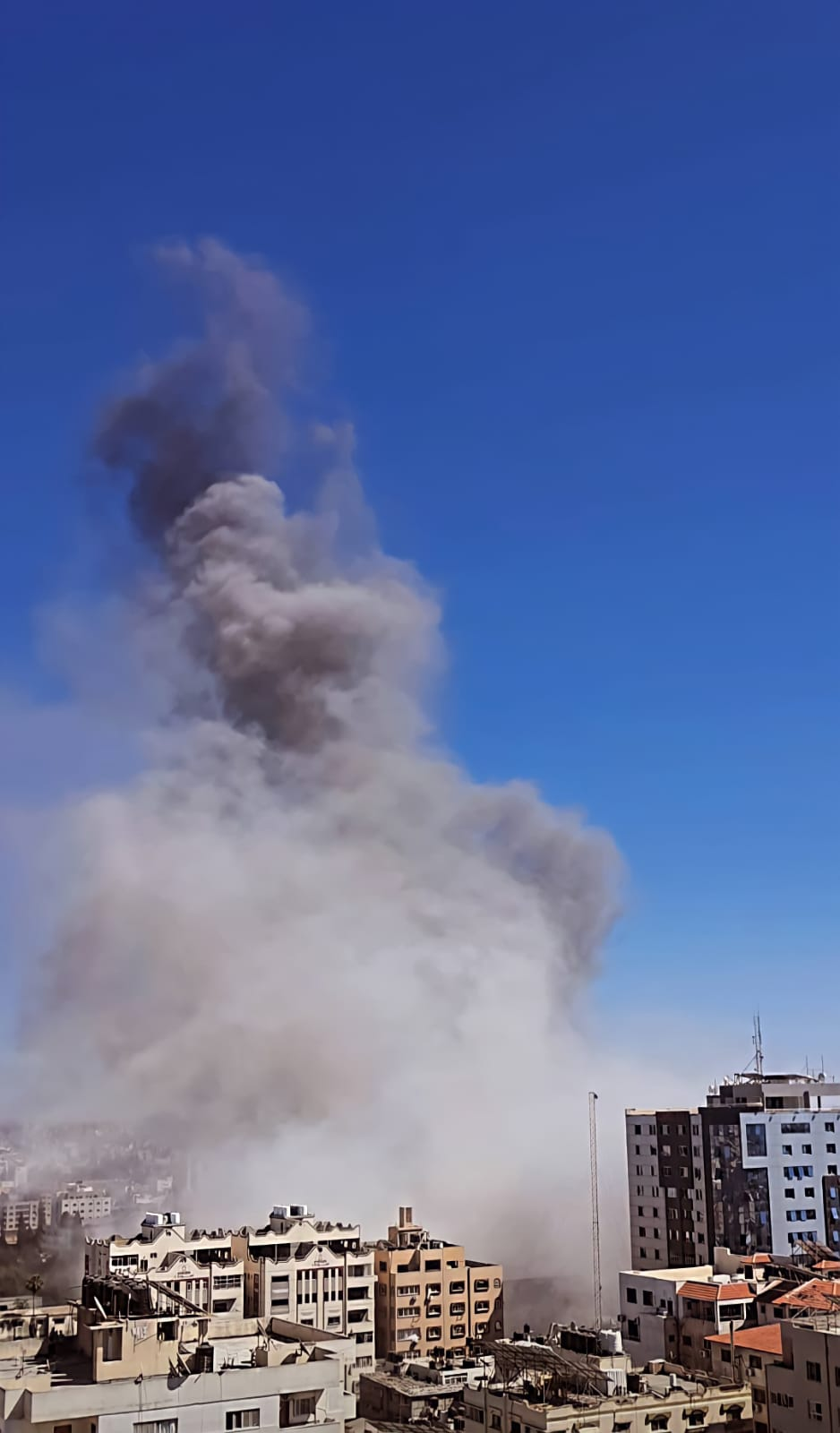
Israel destroys the al-Jalaa media building, 15 May

On 15 May the IDF destroyed the al-Jalaa Building in Gaza, which housed the Al Jazeera Media Network and Associated Press journalists, and a number of other press offices and apartments. The building was hit by three missiles, approximately an hour after Israeli forces called the building's owner, warning of the attack and advising all occupants to evacuate. The press agencies demanded an explanation; the IDF said at the time that the building housed assets of Hamas military intelligence. On 8 June, Israel stated that a Hamas electronic warfare unit developing a system to jam the Iron Dome was based in the building. AP demanded proof of this; Hamas did not immediately make any comment. Israel said that it did not suspect that AP personnel knew of Hamas's use of the building, and offered to assist AP in rebuilding its offices and operations in Gaza. Israel stated that it provided the US government intelligence on the strike but would not make the information public. US Secretary of State Antony Blinken confirmed that Israel had sent the US information and said "It's my understanding that we've received some further information through intelligence channels, and it's not something I can comment on."

On the same day — the 73rd anniversary of the nakba, in the first of several attacks on Gaza's industrial infrastructure, Israel fired an estimated six canisters of M150 Smoke HC 155mm shells between 5:46 and 5:48 pm into the Khudair Pharmaceutical and Agricultural Tools warehouse in Beit Lahiya in northern Gaza. Such munitions are designed to create smoke screens to cover troop movements, though no Israeli forces were present in the area. The Khudair Warehouse stores roughly 50% of all vital agricultural chemicals used in the besieged strip. The strike caused hundreds of tons of pesticides, fertilisers, plastics and nylons to go up in flames, with a toxic plume spreading 5.7 km^{2}. A year later the forensic architectural unit of the Palestinian NGO Al-Haq concluded a study claiming that the strike amounted to the deployment by Israel of 'indirect ... chemical weapons'. Israel had foreknowledge of the contents of the warehouse, the materials all having been imported from Israel. According to legal experts, the incident may be prosecutable under the Rome Statute of the International Criminal Court.

The single deadliest incident of the campaign occurred on 16 May, when Israeli warplanes fired 11 missiles along a 200-yard (180 m) stretch of Wehda Street, in the upscale Rimal neighborhood. According to the IDF, a Hamas tunnel and underground command center were the targets of the attack which destroyed two residential buildings, killing 44 civilians. According to the IDF, the extent to which the underground military infrastructure had extended under civilian buildings in the area had not been known, and when the missiles exploded underground and destroyed the facilities targeted, they unexpectedly dislodged the foundations of civilian buildings above them, causing them to collapse. The IDF said that it had not expected the extent of the civilian casualties which occurred. Speaking to The Independent, a senior Israeli military official said that the civilian death toll was unexpected and that the attack had been aimed at the center of the road to minimize collateral damage, but that the IDF's calculations had failed to anticipate the collapse of nearby buildings. The official said that the Israeli Air Force suspected that there may have been explosives or munitions stored in the underground infrastructure targeted which ultimately caused the buildings to collapse. Another senior Israeli official later said that the estimated 1/1 ratio between militants and civilians in the strike was 'phenomenal' given how deeply military infrastructure was embedded in civilian areas of the neighborhood. On May 26, Yahya Sinwar, leader of the Hamas political wing in Gaza, denied that any of their tunnels were under civilian areas and dismissed the accusation as "baseless". On June 5, Sinwar admitted that Hamas did embed military command centers in civilian locations. Sinwar said "We and other factions have initiated a gradual transfer operation with the aim of relocating a number of military headquarters from within the civilian population."

IDF animation of the plan to attack Hamas' tunnel network

The Israeli Air Force carried out another large-scale series of raids against Hamas' tunnel network on 17 May, bombing over 15 kilometers of underground passages, with 54 Israeli jets dropping 110 bombs. The homes of nine Hamas commanders and a home used by Hamas' military intelligence branch were also bombed.

During the fighting, Hamas militants with anti-tank guided missiles repeatedly took positions in apartments and behind dunes. These teams were identified by IDF reconnaissance units and subsequently destroyed in pinpoint attacks. At least 20 such teams were destroyed by Israeli air and ground forces. On 20 May, a Hamas anti-tank missile attack on an IDF bus lightly wounded one soldier. The attack came moments after a group of 10 soldiers had disembarked from the bus.

In addition, the IDF sank Hamas' fleet of small unmanned submarines designed to explode under or near Israeli naval vessels or oil and gas drilling rigs. Hamas tried repeatedly to attack Israel's Tamar gas field. At two least attempts to launch attacks with autonomous submarines were intercepted. In one instance, a Hamas team was spotted launching the submarine. An Israeli navy vessel destroyed the submarine while it was still close to the shore and the Israeli Air Force subsequently attacked the team which launched it.

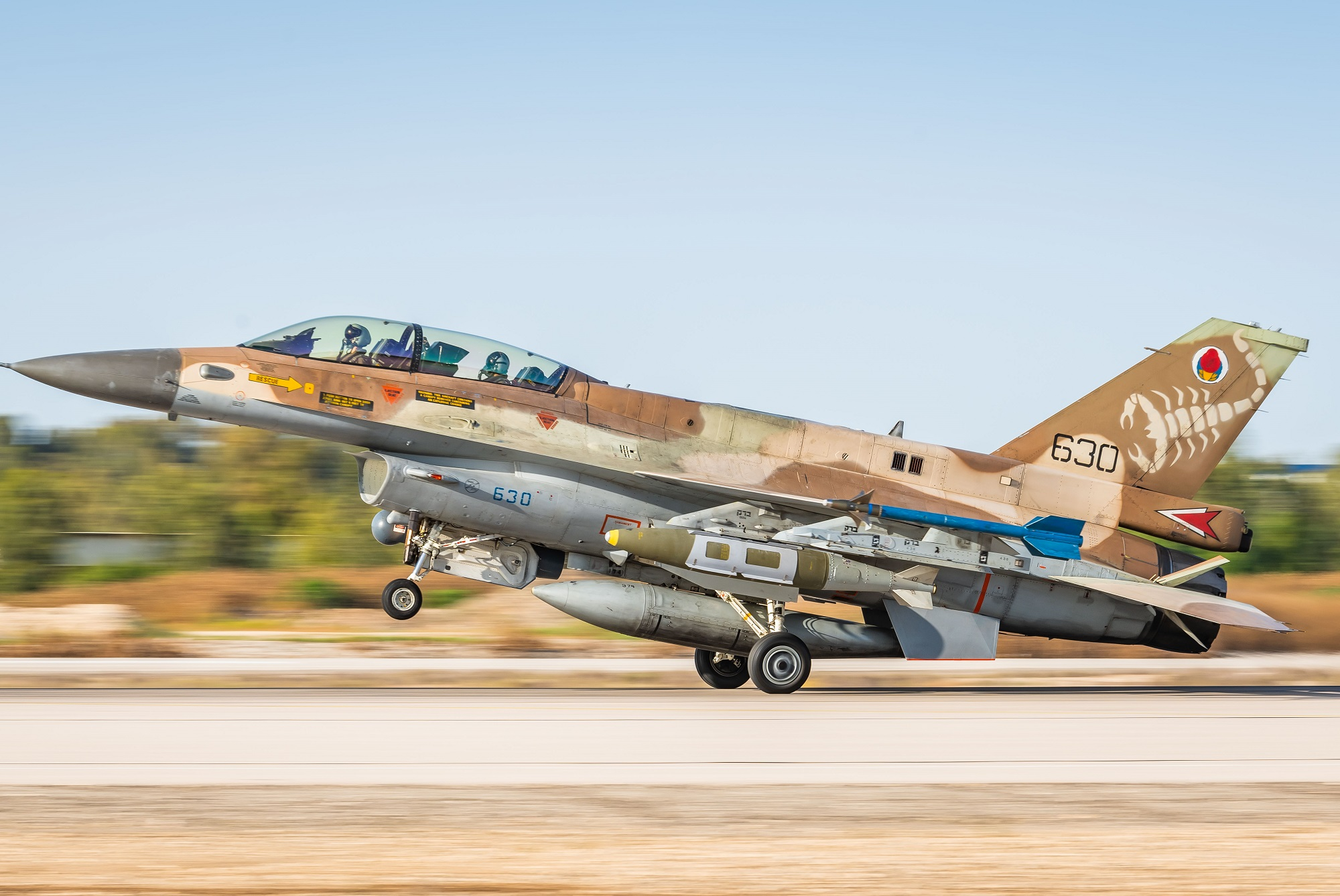
An Israeli Air Force F-16 warplane takes off with guided munition to strike targets in the Gaza Strip

By the end of the campaign, over 4,360 rockets and mortar shells had been fired at southern and central Israel, an average of 400 per day. About 3,400 successfully crossed the border while 680 fell in Gaza and 280 fell into the sea. The Iron Dome shot down 1,428 rockets detected as heading toward populated areas, an interception rate of 95 percent. Some 60–70 rockets hit populated areas after the Iron Dome failed to intercept them. The attacks killed 6 Israeli civilians, among them a 5-year-old boy and two Israeli-Arabs, as well as three foreign nationals working in Israel: an Indian woman working as a caregiver in Ashkelon and two Thai workers who were killed when the packing house of a community in southern Israel close to the Gaza border took a direct hit. Three other Israeli civilians including an 87-year-old woman died from injuries sustained after they fell while running to bomb shelters during attacks.

The IDF estimated that it destroyed 850 rockets in strikes on the Gaza Strip and also severely degraded local rocket manufacturing capabilities in strikes on about three dozen rocket production centers. In addition, Israel assassinated numerous Hamas and Islamic Jihad commanders with airstrikes. Nearly 30 senior Hamas commanders were assassinated by the IDF during the campaign. Israel's ability to locate senior commanders to such an extent indicated extensive Israeli intelligence penetration of Hamas' ranks.

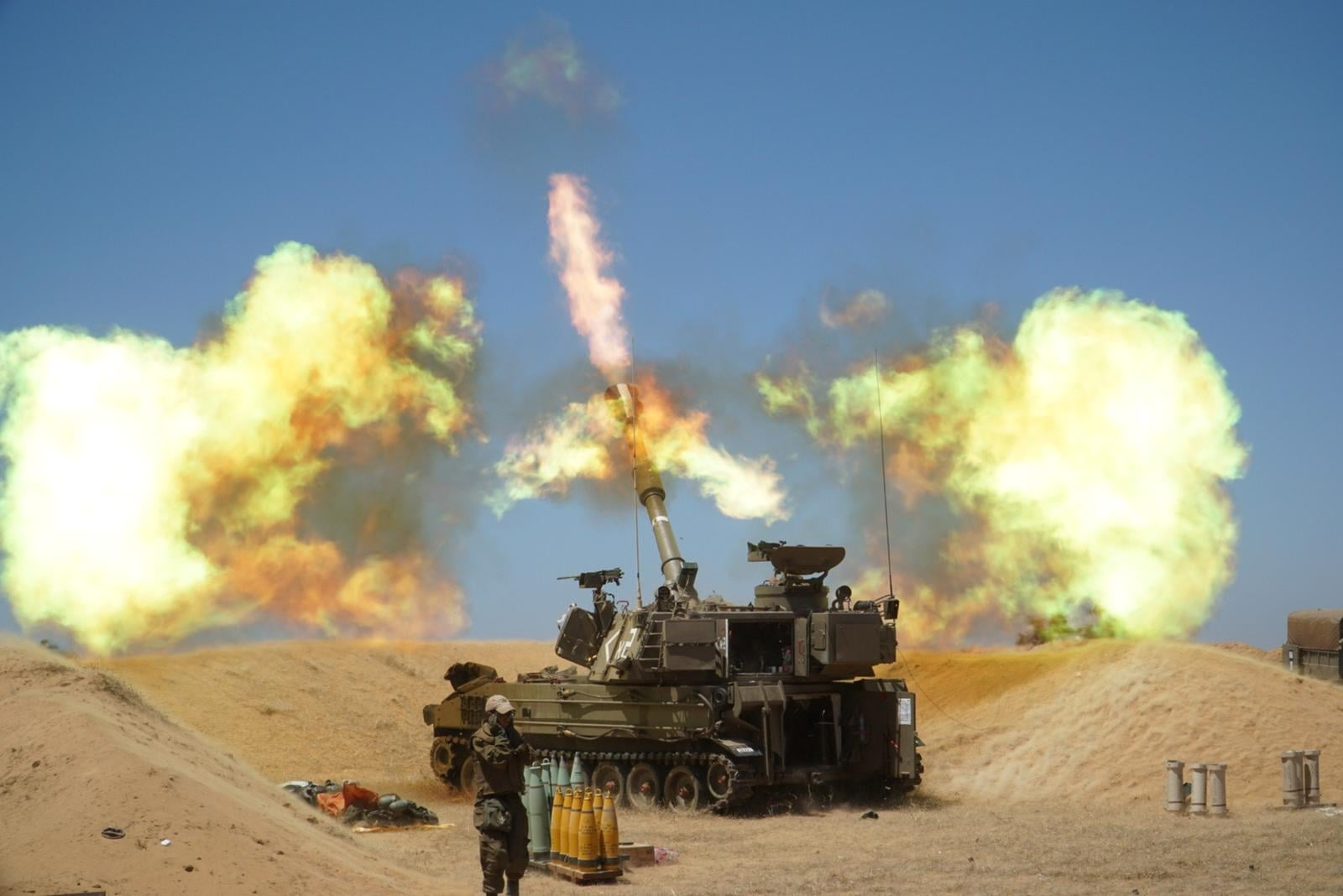
Israeli artillery firing into Gaza, 18 May

In three instances, Hamas attempted to launch cross-border raids into Israel to kill or kidnap soldiers and civilians, utilizing tunnels that approached but did not cross into Israeli territory to enable its fighters to get close. All of these attacks were foiled. In one instance, a group of Hamas fighters were struck before entering a tunnel and in two other instances the groups were targeted while in the tunnels. A total of 18 Hamas fighters were killed. The IDF also stated that seven Hamas drones that crossed into Israeli airspace were shot down, including at least one by an Iron Dome battery. An Israeli drone was also accidentally shot down by an Iron Dome battery.

According to Israeli journalist Haviv Rettig Gur, Israel systematically thwarted Hamas' tactical innovations and destroyed the military infrastructure it had prepared for a future war, which proved "ineffective or outright useless".

The United Nations said that more than 72,000 Palestinians had been internally displaced, sheltering mostly at 48 UNRWA schools in Gaza. After the ceasefire, less than 1,000 displaced Palestinians were sheltering in UNRWA schools, down from a peak of around 66,000.

UNWRA discovered a cavity 7.5 metres under one of its two schools in Gaza that had been damaged by Israeli air strikes. The structure had neither an exit from or entry into the school's premises, and the organization strongly condemned both the IDF and the Palestinians responsible for building the "possible" tunnel.

=== Lebanon and Syria ===
On 13 May at least three rockets were fired from the coastal area of Qlaileh just south of the Palestinian refugee camp of Rashidieh in the Southern Lebanese district of Tyre across the Israeli–Lebanese border, according to the IDF, landing in the Mediterranean Sea. Hezbollah denied responsibility for the rocket launches and Lebanese Army troops were deployed to the area around the refugee camp, finding several rockets there.

On 14 May, dozens of Lebanese demonstrated on the Israel-Lebanon border in solidarity with the Palestinians. A small group of demonstrators cut through the border fence and crossed into Israel, setting fires near Metulla. IDF troops fired at them, killing one who was later identified as a member of Hezbollah. Another was wounded and later died of his injuries. That evening, three rockets were fired from Syria, while two of them hit the Israeli-occupied Golan Heights but fell in uninhabited places. The following day, Lebanese demonstrators damaged the border fence with Molotov cocktails and other items.

On 17 May, six rockets were fired by Palestinian militants towards Israel but the rockets failed to cross the Lebanese-Israeli border. The Israeli military responded by firing artillery shells across the border in the direction of the rocket fire. No one was injured in the incident.

The IDF said that on 19 May four rockets were fired from near Siddikine village in the Tyre District of Southern Lebanon towards Haifa. One was intercepted, another landed in an open area, and the remaining two fell into the sea. The Israeli army responded with artillery fire.

== Casualties and damage ==
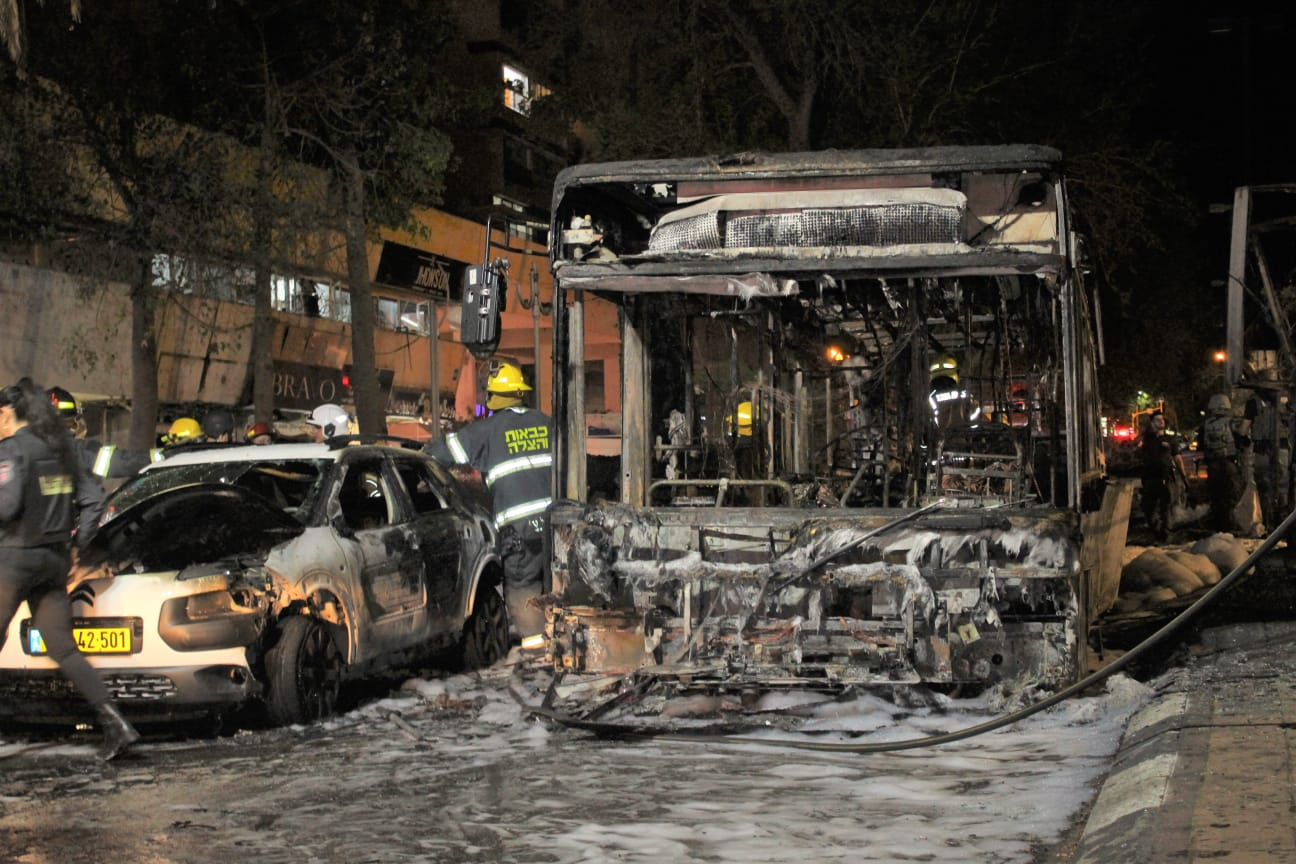
Wreckage of a bus and car in Holon, Israel, after a rocket attack, 11 May

Thirteen people were killed in Israel, including two children, one Indian woman and two Thai men living and working in Israel. By May 18, the Magen David Adom ambulance service had treated 114 injuries directly related to rocket attacks, and another 198 indirectly related to rocket attacks.

The UN and Human Rights Watch reported that 260 Palestinians were killed during the hostilities, half of them (129) civilians, including 66 children and 40 women. Some 243 were reportedly killed by Israeli Defense Forces. The Gazan Health Ministry stated that 1,948 individuals were wounded, of whom 610 were children, and 400 women. Four of the women killed were pregnant. Israel reported killing 200 militants, while 80 Palestinian fighters were killed according to Hamas. Among militant casualties, the Gaza Brigade commander, Bassem Issa, was killed on 12 May, together with Jomaa Abdullah Talha and some of Hamas top officials and engineers, while Iyad Sharir, commander of an anti-tank unit, was killed the next day alongside his wife and daughter. One of the dead children was claimed by the Al-Mujahideen Brigades as one of their own.

Some Palestinian rockets fell short and landed in the Gaza Strip resulting in at least seven casualties. According to Israel, approximately 640 rockets did so. It is disputed whether some of the first victims on 10 May died as a result of an Israeli airstrike or an errant Palestinian rocket.

On 13 May, as part of a feint intended to deceive Hamas into sending their men into tunnels before they were programmed to be bombed, the IDF's 162nd Division subjected a section of the northern Gaza Strip to an intense artillery barrage of 500 shells. Some of the ordnance hit an agricultural site, the al-Karya compound, close to Beit Lahia. As a result, 3 daughters – aged 17, 26 and 28 – and a 9-month old baby son from a single family were killed, together with a two members of another family in their home next door. A follow-up investigation by the IDF concluded there had been some negligence and those involved were assigned to retraining.

According to a report by the Intelligence and Terrorism Information Center, which has ties to the IDF, 48% of the Palestinians killed in Gaza were militants. The report noted varying figures of Palestinians killed in Gaza ranging between 240 and 260 and analyzed the deaths of 234 Palestinians in the Gaza Strip. It identified 112 of those 234 as militants, of whom 63 were members of Hamas, 20 were members of the Islamic Jihad Movement, 25 were members of an armed faction of Fatah, and the rest were members of smaller militant splinter groups. According to the ITIC report, 21 Palestinians were killed by misfired Palestinian rockets which landed in the Gaza Strip.

According to Amira Hass, 15 Israeli strikes have targeted individual family dwellings, causing multiple deaths among members of the 15 families living there. When the ceasefire came into effect, the Palestinian National Authority set the number of entire families killed at 20, and announced it will lodge a complaint at the International Court of Justice for "war crimes" in that regard. Palestinian journalist Yusuf Abu Hussein was killed in an Israeli airstrike in his home on 19 May, prompting outcry from the International Federation of Journalists. An Israeli airstrike on 20 May killed a disabled Palestinian man, his pregnant wife, and their three-year-old daughter. A later investigation found that Hamas militants had built a military structure inside a Palestinian elementary school.

A Hamas commander, identified as Mohammed Abdullah Fayyad, as well as three high-ranking Islamic Jihad commanders were also killed. Another Hamas member was killed on 11 May. The deaths of the five commanders were confirmed by official statements of both the groups. The deaths of other militants are suspected but not confirmed. Bassem Issa, a top Hamas commander, was killed together with several others, including Jomaa Talha and Jamal Zibdeh.

On 18 May, Egypt pledged $500 million in efforts to rebuild Gaza after the missile strikes. Qatar likewise pledged $500 million.

=== Medical facilities and personnel ===
Hamas has been accused by Israel of using medical facilities to cover its activities. The Ministry of Health is run by the Hamas government, and wounded militants are often treated in civilian hospitals. As of 17 May, the Israeli airstrikes on Gaza have caused the following damage, according to the UN's Office for the Coordination of Humanitarian Affairs:

- 4 hospitals run by Gaza's ministry of health, including the Indonesian and Beit Hanoun hospitals in the northern Gaza Strip.
- 2 hospitals run by NGOs
- 2 clinics, one run by Médecins Sans Frontières, and one, the Hala al-Shawa clinic, in disuse at the time.
- 1 health centre
- 1 Palestine Red Crescent Society facility.

Personnel killed:

- Dr Moein Ahmad al-Aloul (66), a leading Gaza neurologist, killed when his house in the Rimal quarter collapsed after an Israeli strike on shops on the building's ground level. His 5 children were also killed in the strike.
- Dr Ayman Abu al-Auf, the Al-Shifa Hospital's head of internal medicine and director of Gaza's COVID-19 response, killed by falling rubble after a strike on al-Wehda Street, a controversial strike that killed over 40 people. 12 members of his extended family were also killed.

By 18 May, seventeen hospitals and clinics in Gaza had suffered damage, according to The New York Times.

The Israeli strike near the Rimal clinic, the only major COVID-19 laboratory in the Strip, caused it to be temporarily shut down, with the PLO claiming on Twitter that this rendered the entire strip unable to conduct further screening for the pandemic.

=== Infrastructure ===
Footage of Israeli naval strikes during the crisis, May 2021

==== Gaza ====
232 housing units in high-rises were bombed over 11 days. According to a 23 May post-ceasefire UNOCHA estimate,

- 1,042 housing and commercial units, spread over 258 buildings, were destroyed
- 769 further units suffered severe damage.
- 53 schools were damaged
- 6 hospitals and 11 clinics were damaged.
- The IDF said it had destroyed 60 miles (97 km) of Hamas's underground tunnel system, nicknamed the Metro.

On 18 May an Israeli airstrike demolished the buildings where one of the major booksellers in Gaza was sited, Samir Mansour's 2 story bookshop along with its stock of an estimated 100,000 books.

==== Israel ====
3,424 claims of compensation for property damage have been filed by Israelis as a result of the fighting: 1,724 related to damage to motor vehicles.

== War crimes ==
In late July 2021, Human Rights Watch (HRW) raised the possibility that both parties in the conflict had engaged in war crimes on the basis of field reports regarding specific incidents. The organization said that several Israeli bombing attacks were listed as appearing to have killed entire families in areas where no military targets have been ascertained to have existed, and that these may amount to warcrimes, and that the firing by Palestinian militants of unguided rockets towards Israeli civilian centres was a war crime. B'Tselem has also accused both parties of war crimes. HRW called on the International Criminal Court to investigate Israeli strikes during the May operation. In August, 2021, HRW issued a report stating that the thousands of rockets fired by the Palestinian militant group Hamas during the 11-day war with Israel "violated the laws of war and amount to war crimes." Investigations were made into Hamas rocket attacks that killed 12 civilians in Israel, as well as a misfired rocket that killed seven Palestinians inside the Gaza Strip.

HRW said that Israel refused to allow the organization's senior investigators to enter Gaza, and instead relied on a local Gaza researcher, in addition to using satellite images, expert analysis of photos and munition fragments, and phone and video interviews.

HRW said it "focused its investigation on three Israeli attacks that resulted in high numbers of civilian casualties and where there was no evident military target":

- The Israeli missile strike at 6 p.m. on May 10 against one of 4 buildings owned by the al-Masri brothers led to the deaths of 8 people, 6 of whom were children. Israeli military sources said the following day that 6 of the killed had died as a result of a failed launching of a rocket by Palestinian Islamic Jihad. On the 16th, the IDF stated that 8 activists had been killed, posting a photo of the grain dealer killed in this strike. The family denies he had any links to militant groups. At the time, according to survivors and witnesses, the family was engaged in packing processed barley into sacks. The high number of children killed, 6, was attributed by eyewitnesses to the fact that they had crowded around the trader's horse-drawn cart on its arrival at the site to pick up the barley. A video taken in the immediate aftermath, deemed authentic, exists that shows empty, overturned sacks of barley. No evidence exists that the family had any connection to Gaza militant groups.
- At 1:40 a.m. on May 15, an Israeli strike launched with what appears to be a fuse-delayed GBU-39 Small Diameter Bomb demolished a three-story building owned by Alaa Abu Hattab in the al-Shati refugee camp, killing 10 people: 2 women and 8 of their children. The owner was momentarily away, to find snacks and some food for the Eid al-Fitr meal. The IDF stated that senior Hamas officials were inside one of the building's apartments, and the strike also aimed at a bunker beneath the block. Human Rights Watch found no evidence for any such structure.
- The strike on al-Wehda street, just before 1 a.m. on May 16, consisted of between 18 and 34 strikes, employing 1,000-kilogram GBU-31 bombs, along roughly 1,030 meters of road which destroyed 3 buildings and caused the death of 44 civilians – 18 children, 14 women, and 12 men, with a further 50 injured. The IDF stated that it sought to destroy suspected underground military infrastructure. Hamas has denied the existence of any such infrastructure in civilian areas, though, after an Israeli strike on a deserted UNRWA preparatory school in Gaza's Rimal district, UN observers stated that a tunnel had come to light as a result of the bombing. HRW states that no evidence has been given that tunnels or an underground centre existed in the area. No advance warnings were given to the civilians foreseeably effected by the bombing.

On 24 May 2022, the Palestinian human rights organizations Al-Haq, Al-Mezan and the Palestinian Center for Human Rights filed a report to the International Criminal Court concerning the attacks in the Gaza strip.

== Diplomacy and ceasefire ==
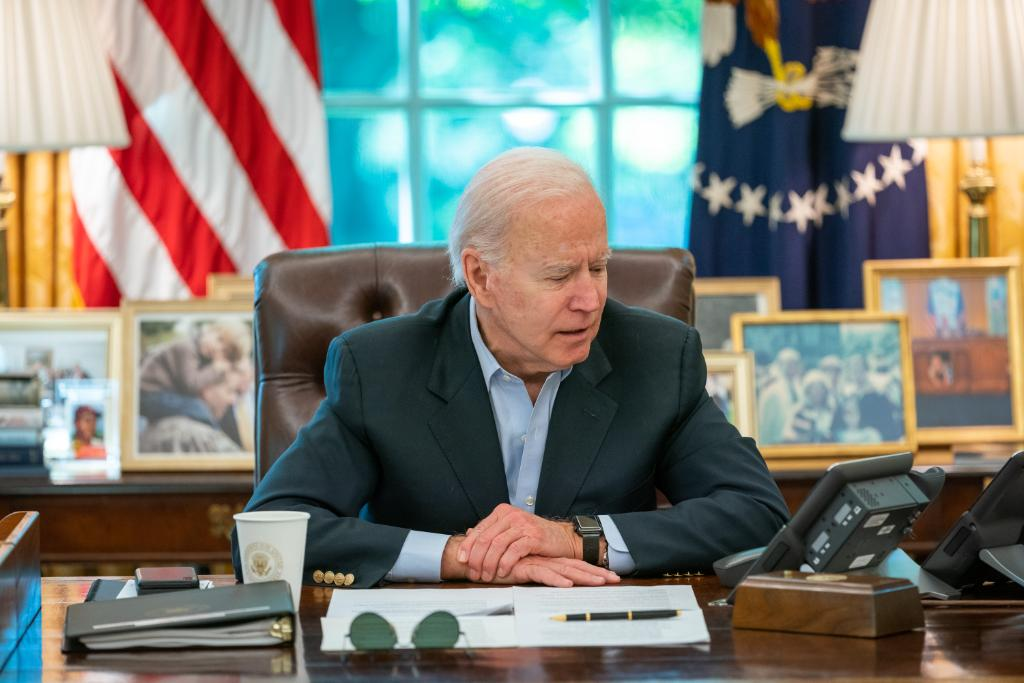
U.S. President Joe Biden speaking with Israeli Prime Minister Netanyahu, reaffirmed his "strong support for Israel's right to defend itself".

China, Norway and Tunisia requested a public United Nations Security Council meeting for 14 May while the United States objected. The council has met privately twice but has not been able to agree on a statement over United States objections.

On 12 May, it was announced that Hady Amr, U.S. Deputy Assistant Secretary for Israeli-Palestinian Affairs and Press and Public Diplomacy, would be sent to the region "immediately." Truce efforts by Egypt, Qatar and the United Nations showed no sign of progress. Amr arrived in Tel Aviv for discussions on how to achieve a "sustainable calm" ahead of a United Nations Security Council meeting on 16 May.

On 13 May, Hamas made a proposal for a ceasefire, stating that it was prepared to halt attacks on a 'mutual basis'. Netanyahu informed his cabinet that Israel had rejected the overture. On 13 May, U.S. president Joe Biden held telephone call with Prime Minister Benjamin Netanyahu. Biden stated that "Israel has a right to defend itself when you have thousands of rockets flying into your territory."

UN Secretary-General António Guterres called for an immediate ceasefire, "out of respect for the spirit of Eid", making reference to Eid al-Fitr, an Islamic festival which marks the end of the holy month of Ramadan.

On 16 May, Biden held telephone calls with Prime Minister Benjamin Netanyahu, and President Mahmoud Abbas.

Following the third UN Security Council emergency meeting in a week, the United States used its veto power to block a proposed statement drafted by China, Norway, and Tunisia and supported by the other 14 members of the council. No vote was held on the statement. The draft statement called for an immediate cessation of hostilities and condemned the violence in Gaza; it urged all parties, especially Israel, to use restraint, but made no mention of the rocket attacks by Hamas and Islamic Jihad.

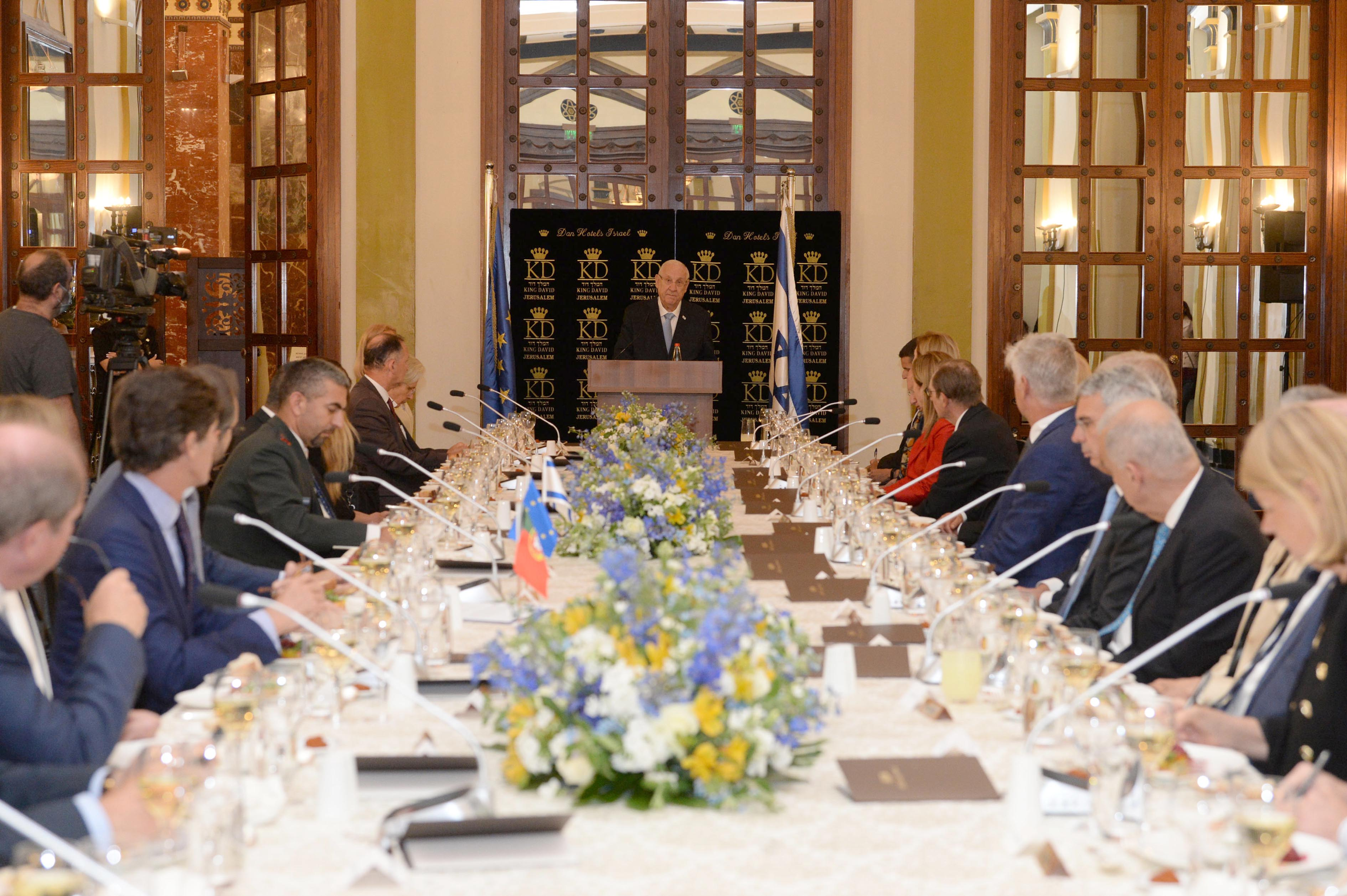
President of Israel Reuven Rivlin holding an emergency meeting with European Union ambassadors on 11 May 2021

On 18 May, the Greek foreign minister Nikos Dendias becomes the first European official to visit Israel and Palestine, followed by a visit to Jordan, in consultation with France, Egypt, the United Arab Emirates and the United States as part of the efforts for brokering a ceasefire between the two parties, while France announced the filing of a resolution with the UN Security Council calling for a cease-fire, in coordination with Egypt and Jordan. The resolution could be circulated as soon as 19 May. Security Council press and presidential statements require approval of all 15 members while resolutions do not.

On 19 May, Biden held a phone call with Prime Minister Benjamin Netanyahu, expressing to his Israeli counterpart that "he expected a significant de-escalation today on the path to a ceasefire." On 20 May, the foreign ministers of Germany, the Czech Republic, and Slovakia visited Israel to express support and solidarity with Israel.

Israel and Hamas agreed to cease hostilities from 20 May. A ceasefire deal brokered by Egypt, Qatar, and the United Nations between Israel and Hamas was enacted at around 2:00 AM on 21 May 2021, ending 11 days of fighting. The final proposal by Egypt was voted on by the Israeli cabinet and was unanimously approved, and Hamas also indicated their acceptance of the peace deal. Other than a minor skirmish at Al-Aqsa Mosque, there were no substantive violations of the ceasefire throughout the day on 21 May. In the hours before the Egypt-brokered deal, Biden had spoken with Egyptian president Abdel Fattah el-Sisi about brokering such a deal. Biden later described the deal as "mutual" and "unconditional" and expressed his belief that both sides deserved to live in safety. Both sides claimed victory in the conflict. The truce tentatively concluded the fourth war between Israel and the Islamist militant group since 2008.

=== Aftermath and post-ceasefire tensions ===
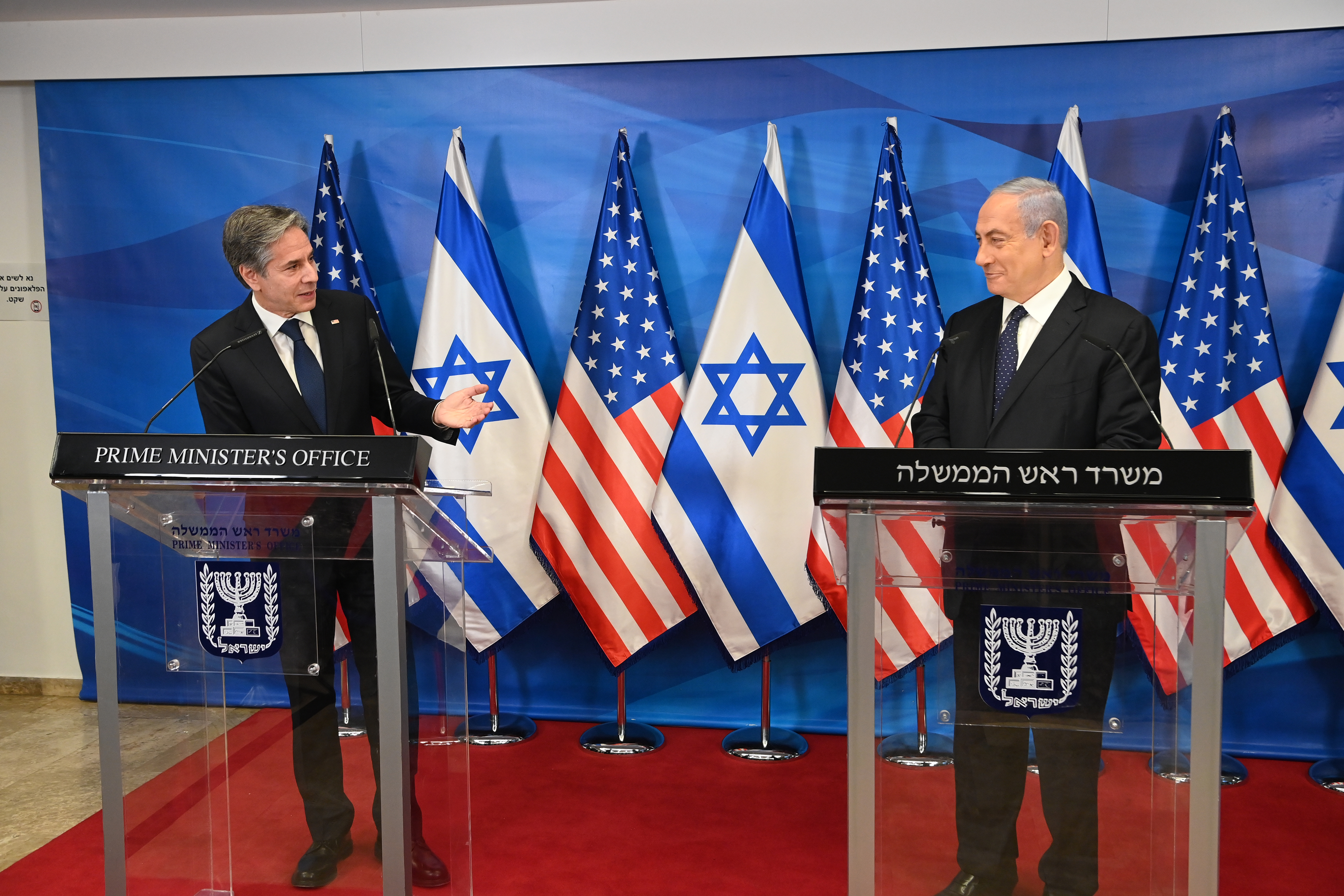
U.S. Secretary of State Antony Blinken and Israeli prime minister Benjamin Netanyahu at the Prime Minister's Office in Jerusalem on 25 May 2021

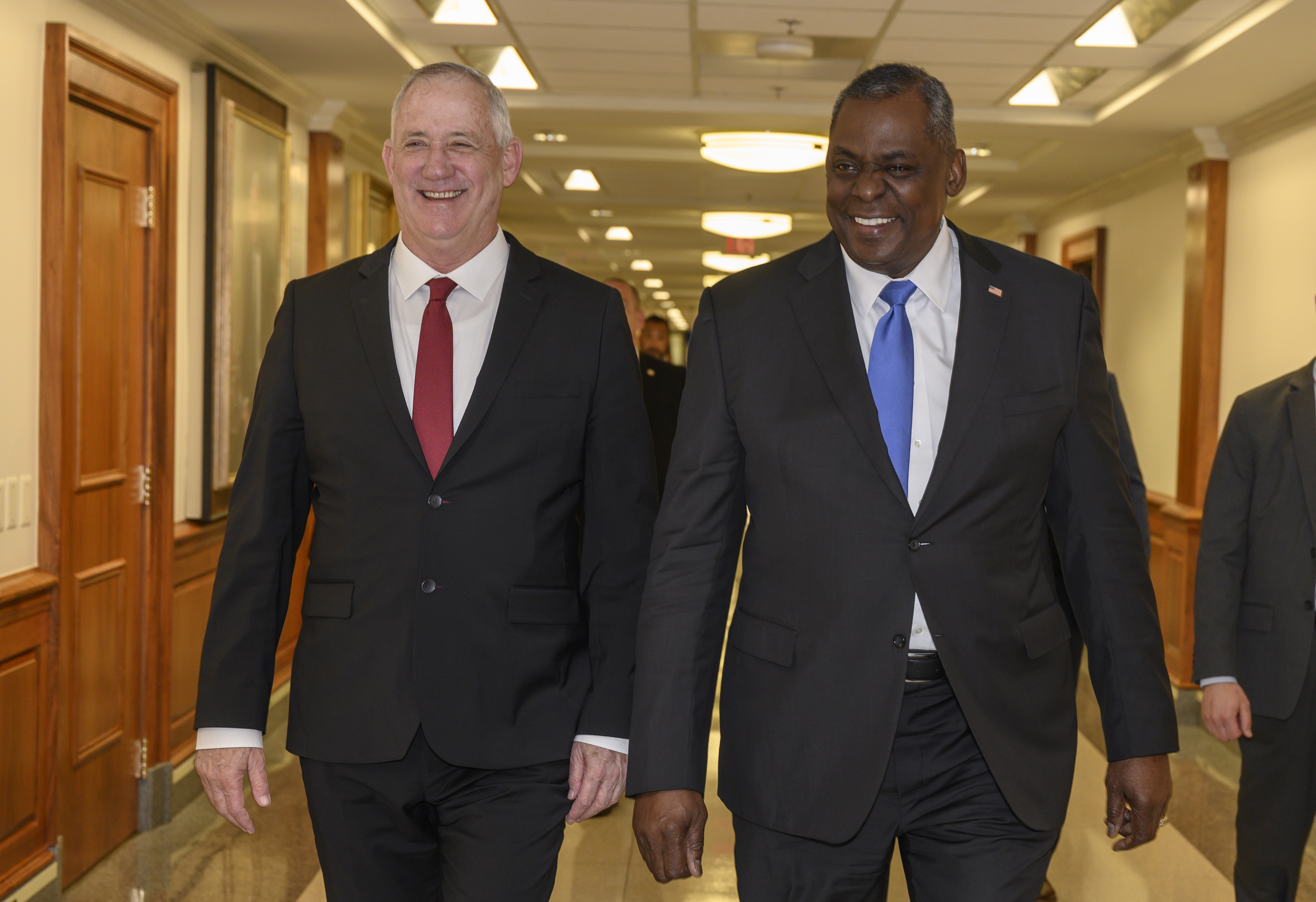
Israeli Minister of Defense Benny Gantz and U.S. Secretary of Defense Lloyd Austin at the Pentagon, Washington, D.C., on 3 June 2021

Just hours after the ceasefire came into effect, what The New York Times described as a "small skirmish", in which 20 Palestinians were reportedly wounded, and 16 arrested, between Israeli police and Palestinians took place just outside the Al Aqsa mosque. The incident occurred after noon prayers, when most of the tens of thousands of worshipers had left the site. A few in the remaining group waved Palestinian flags; Israeli police entered to confiscate the flags and disperse the crowd. The Israeli version is that hundreds of Palestinians threw stones and firebombs on the arrival of the Israeli police. The Palestinian version is that the violence erupted only when the police entered the compound.

On 22 May, according to an Egyptian diplomat, two teams of Egyptian mediators were in Israel and the Palestinian territories with the intent to "firm up" the cease-fire deal and to secure a long-term calm. Antony Blinken, a US diplomat and state secretary, planned to visit Israel and the West Bank on 26–27 May with the same idea. The UN security council finally released an agreed statement calling for full adherence to the truce and stressing the immediate need for humanitarian aid for Palestinian civilians while reiterating the need for the two-state solution. The statement made no reference to Hamas.

After international pressure was applied, on 23 May Israel agreed to permit the transfer of food and medical supplies furnished by the United Nations and Physicians for Human Rights, aid workers, and journalists into the Gaza Strip, but on 24 May refused transfer. On 25 May, coinciding with a state visit by Blinken to Israel, aid was permitted to enter the strip. At the end of May, Hamas said it would begin launching rockets again if the evictions in Sheikh Jarrah were allowed to go ahead; a decision by the Israeli Supreme Court was expected within a month.

UNHRC was to investigate "systematic discrimination and repression" in Israel and Palestine to identify the root causes of the crisis, after a resolution drafted for the Organisation of Islamic Conference received 24 supporting votes and 9 opposing ones. Subsequently, on 22 July 2021, UNHRC announced that former United Nations high commissioner Navi Pillay would head the international commission of inquiry into alleged crimes committed during the crisis and report in June 2022.

Amid continuing communal tension and protest, the Israeli police force said it had arrested 348 suspects in late May as it rounded up alleged participants in the unrest, confirming reports from human rights organisation Adalah which said at least 200 Palestinians in Israel had been arrested that week, and described the raids as a way to "intimidate and exact revenge".

On 5 June, at Sheikh Jarrah, border police forcefully detained an Al Jazeera reporter wearing body armor marked "press". Israeli police said the journalist was detained after she was asked for identification, refused and pushed a police officer. On 6 June Israeli police detained Muna al-Kurd. Her father told reporters that the 23-year-old activist was detained after police raided their home in Sheikh Jarrah and said that the police also delivered a notice ordering her twin brother Mohammed El-Kurd to surrender himself to authorities. He and his sister are running a social media campaign against the expulsions of Palestinians from their homes. The pair were later released.

Efforts to broker a longer-term truce between Israel and Hamas followed a day of escalating tensions on 15 June after a new Israeli government allowed a scaled down and rerouted march by far-right Israelis through the city, with dozens chanting "Death to Arabs". Gaza militants sent several incendiary balloons into Israel, causing 26 fires, and Israeli aircraft struck military posts in Gaza. Some reconstruction material has begun to enter Gaza through Egypt but Israel is currently limiting what can arrive through its crossing points and blocked the supply of financial aid from Qatar. Israel and Hamas disagree on whether to include a prisoner swap as part of any stronger cease-fire deal. "The U.N. is in contact with all relevant parties on matters related to the cessation of hostilities", said Tor Wennesland, the United Nations special coordinator for the Middle East peace process. "This has been going on for a while and will continue with the view of having some arrangements put in place that could stabilize the situation. This is still a work in progress with more to be done."

=== Israeli and Palestinian reactions ===
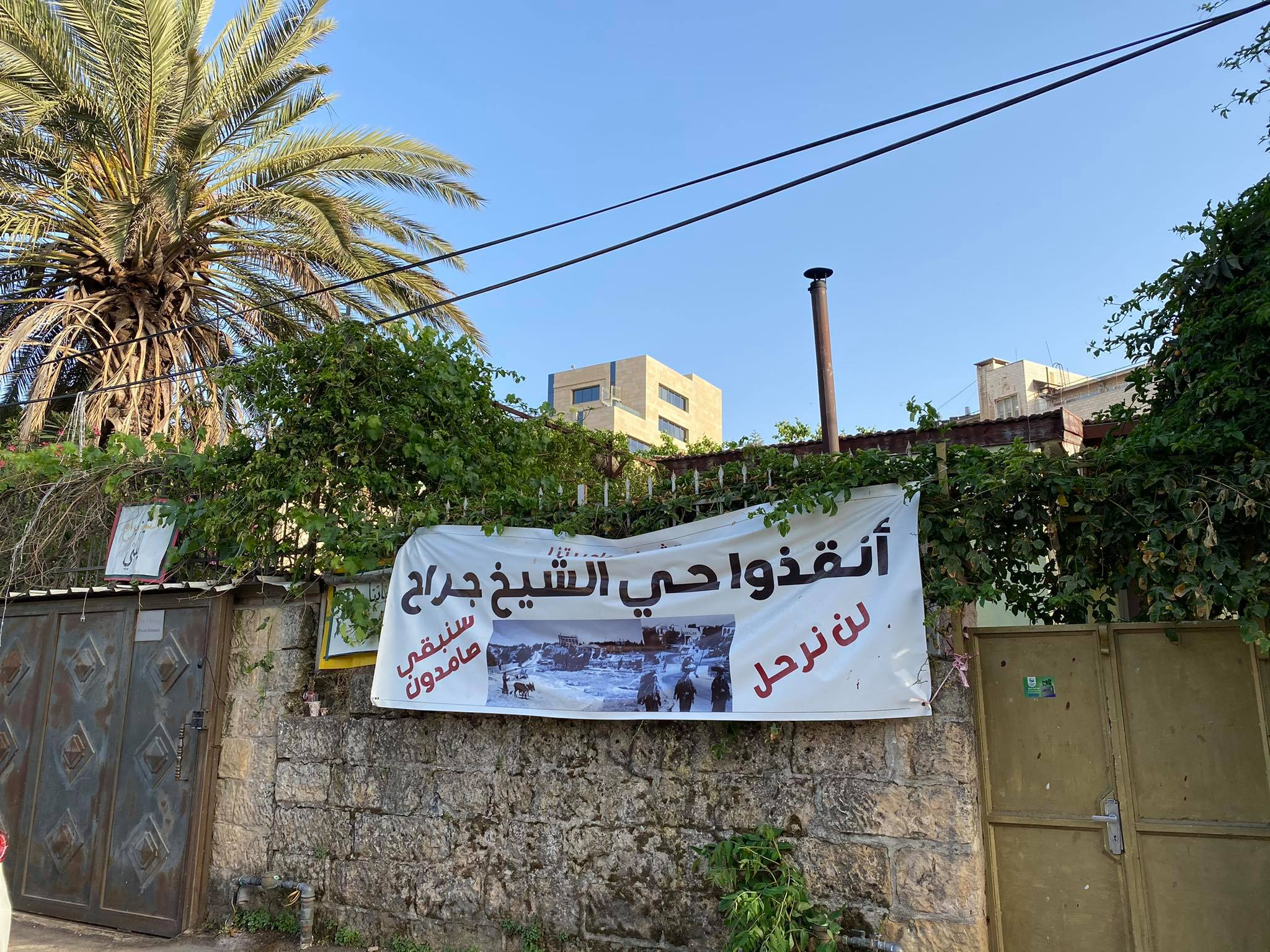
Sign in Arabic reading "We will not leave" on the walls of the Sheikh Jarrah neighborhood

On 9 May 2021, the Israeli Supreme Court delayed the expected decision on evictions for 30 days, after an intervention from Attorney General of Israel Avichai Mandelblit. Israel Police also banned Jews from going to the al-Aqsa plaza for Jerusalem Day festivities. On 10 May, Israel closed the Kerem Shalom border crossing, including for humanitarian aid. Due to rocket fire on 11 May, the Israel Airports Authority briefly halted air travel.

Israeli Prime Minister Benjamin Netanyahu defended the actions of the Israeli police and said that Israel "shall not allow any radical element to undermine the calm." He also said "we firmly reject the pressure not to build in Jerusalem." Israeli officials asked the Biden administration not to intervene in the situation.

On 10 May 2021, Mahmoud Abbas, the President of the Palestinian Authority, issued a statement that the "brutal storming and assault on worshipers in the blessed al-Aqsa Mosque and its courtyards is a new challenge to the international community."

On two separate occasions, Christian groups in Jerusalem issued statements commenting on the outbreak of hostilities. Kairos Palestine attributed the uprising to deprivations suffered, and called for the recognition of the rights of everyone as the only way to break the cycle of destruction. A joint declaration on 7 May, signed by the Greek Orthodox, Armenian and Catholic Patriarchs of the city, together with prominent Heads of Churches of Jerusalem – who had all earlier expressed deep concern for Israeli plans under radical settler pressure to annex unilaterally West Bank land- blamed the growing tensions 'mainly' on the destabilizing effects of right-wing settler groups on the fragile realities of Jerusalem. Their denunciation was followed up by a similar statement issued on 12 May by the Middle East Council of Churches, representing 28 denominations in the area.

Israel's Minister for Public Security Amir Ohana called for the release of the Israeli man arrested for the shooting of an Arab in Lod, arguing without providing evidence that the suspect was acting in self-defense and law-abiding citizens bearing arms assist the authorities. According to a report in The Guardian, the statement seemed to encourage mob violence.

A spokesman for Palestinian Islamic Jihad said that Israel "started the aggression on Jerusalem. If this aggression does not end, there is no point to diplomatic efforts to reach a cease-fire." Hamas gave an ultimatum to the Israeli government, saying if they did not remove forces from the mosque by 2 a.m. on 11 May, then they would conduct another rocket strike.

Netanyahu convened an emergency security meeting on 11 May, and schools in several parts of Israel were closed. Israeli president Reuven Rivlin condemned the riots in Lod, describing them as a pogrom.

A poll cited by The Times of Israel on 20 May found that 72% believed the military operations targeting Gaza should have continued without a ceasefire and that 66% believed Israeli forces had achieved more in recent fighting than in previous campaigns, with a total of 684 Israelis having been surveyed.

== See also ==
- 2018–2019 Gaza border protests
- 2021 in Israel
- List of battles in the 21st century
- List of modern conflicts in the Middle East
- List of ongoing armed conflicts
