= Destruction of the al-Jalaa building =

2021 Israeli attack on a tower in Gaza

- Part of 2021 Israel–Palestine crisis
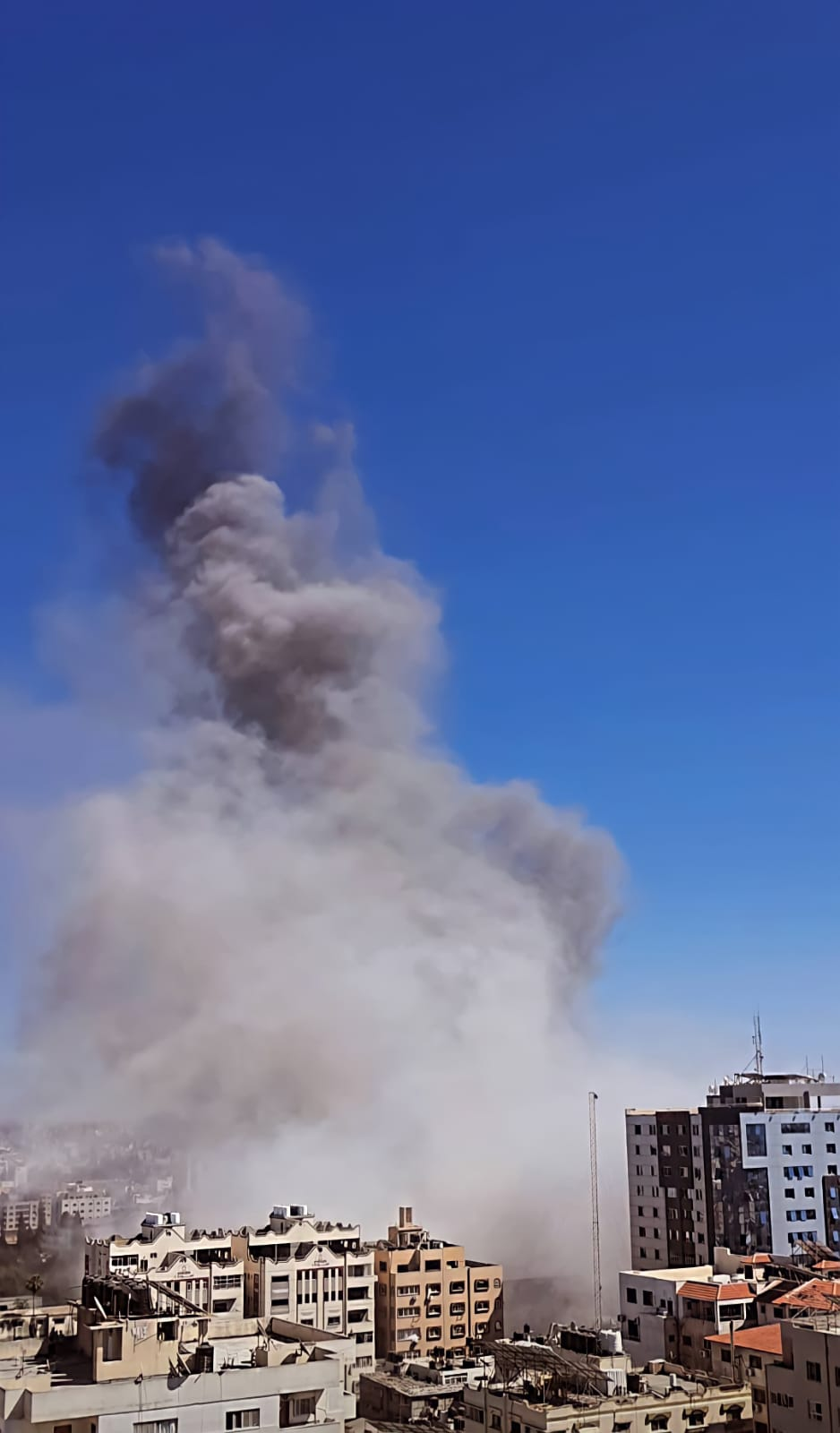
- Smoke rising from the collapsed building after the Israeli strike, 15 May 2021
- Location: 31°30′53″N 34°27′7″E; Gaza City
- Date: 15 May 2021
- Attack type: Airstrike
- Deaths: 0
- Injuries: 0
- Perpetrator: Israel Defense Forces

The destruction of the al-Jalaa building occurred on 15 May 2021 in Gaza City, when the Israeli military levelled the complex because of its alleged use by Hamas during the 2021 Israel–Palestine crisis. The presence of Palestinian militants inside the building has been affirmed by Israel, but denied by journalists who worked there. Israeli authorities claim that they possess proof supporting their allegations, but have not yet shared any such evidence publicly. The event generated significant worldwide controversy as the building contained offices for Al Jazeera, the Associated Press, and other news outlets.

Israel issued warnings to the building's occupants in advance, allowing it to be safely evacuated; no one was injured or killed in the bombing.

== Building ==
The building was 11 stories tall and contained offices and about 60 residential apartments.

== Destruction ==
On 15 May, the Israel Defense Forces (IDF) targeted the al-Jalaa building in Gaza, among the occupants of which were Al Jazeera, the Associated Press, Ernst & Young, and other news outlets. Israeli strike planners were reportedly unaware that the building housed foreign media outlets. At 1:40 P.M., the Shin Bet and the IDF started dialing and texting civilians, including journalists, known to be in the building, forewarning them to evacuate before an imminent strike. Shortly afterwards, two or three missiles hit the top of the site as part of Israel's roof knocking warning system. The building's owner contacted Israeli officials to get the strike called off, while journalists responded by alerting the IDF that journalists required more time to move their equipment out of the building. Once alerted, Israel's military intelligence replied that it has no information regarding the presence of foreign media in the al-Jalaa tower. After discussing the new information for an hour Israeli military authorities decided to proceed with the strike on the grounds that, in their view, Hamas was using the presence of journalists as a human shield. The building was hit by three missiles.

The IDF said it contained assets of Hamas military intelligence. The Associated Press, which had used the building for 15 years, said they had never seen Hamas in the building. On 16 May, Israel said it had shown the United States evidence that Hamas operated inside the building. United States Secretary of State Antony Blinken said he had not personally seen any evidence that Hamas was operating out of the tower, but a senior official at the United States Department of State later said that "any such information would be provided to others in the administration, not directly to the secretary of State", stating that Blinken was only referring to what he had seen personally. On 18 May, Blinken said, "It's my understanding that we've received some further information through intelligence channels, and it's not something I can comment on". It was later publicized that the IDF believed that a Hamas intelligence unit which operated a number of advanced electronic warfare devices was based in the building with the mission of interfering with the operation of Israeli smart bombs by disrupting their GPS reception. On 1 June, Israel said it had provided intelligence to the U.S. government but said that it would not make the information public. On 7 June, Israeli ambassador to the US and representative to the UN Gilad Erdan told top Associated Press executives that Hamas had been developing a system to electronically jam Israel's Iron Dome defenses inside the building.

== Reactions ==
The attack was condemned by the Committee to Protect Journalists. Reporters Without Borders called for a war crimes investigation by the International Criminal Court. Gary Pruitt, CEO of the Associated Press, said the news agency was "shocked and horrified that the Israeli military would target and destroy the building housing AP's bureau and other news organizations in Gaza". He added that "the world will know less about what is happening in Gaza because of what happened today."

António Guterres, Secretary-General of the United Nations, expressed his dismay and warned all sides to stop attacks on civilian buildings.

At a security conference in late October 2021, IDF Major General Nitzan Alon, who had investigated the strike at the time, delivered a talk in which he called the strike an own goal for the disproportionate damage in diplomatic and public relations' terms compared to the actual outcome of the bombing. Another person privy to the details of the strike said that, in the context of increasing upheavals in the streets and with Hamas strikes, the IDF and senior political figures were casting about for something that could impress the public with an Israeli victory picture, something which, in their view, also influenced the 2021 Wehda Street airstrikes.

== See also ==
- Al Jazeera bombing memo featuring an alleged 2004 discussion between the United Kingdom and the United States
- 2021 Israel–Palestine crisis
