= Hady Amr =

American diplomat

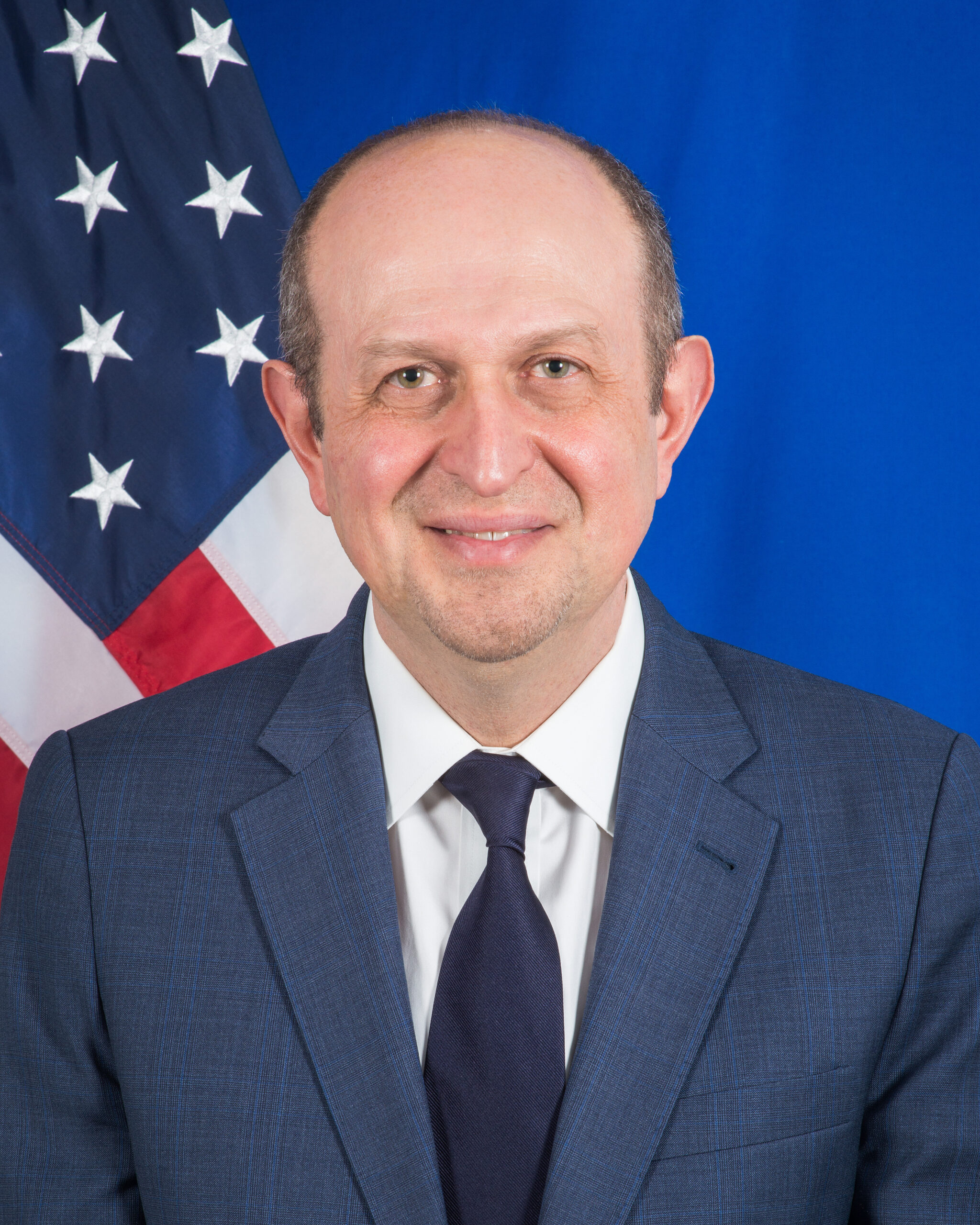

1st United States Special Representative for Palestinian Affairs
- In office November 22, 2022 – January 20, 2025
- President: Joe Biden
- Preceded by: Chris Hodges (as Deputy Assistant Secretary)
- Succeeded by: TBD

Personal details
- Education: Tufts University (B.A.); Princeton University (M.A.)

Hady Amr is an American government official who served as special representative for Palestinian affairs from 2022 to 2025. He was previously Deputy Assistant Secretary for Israeli and Palestinian Affairs in the Bureau of Near Eastern Affairs within the U.S. Department of State. The new position is a significant upgrade in relations with Palestine. He was appointed to the role under President Joe Biden on January 20, 2021. He has been praised by both Israeli and Palestinian leaders alike.

He is a policy analyst and author in the area of U.S. relations with the Muslim world and on the Arab-Israeli conflict, Lebanon, Jordan, and the economic and social development of the Arab world. He has served as a Senior Advisor in the Office of Policy at the Department of Homeland Security, as a Deputy Assistant Administrator for the Middle East at the United States Agency for International Development (USAID), and as United States Deputy Special Envoy for Israeli-Palestinian Negotiations from 2014 to 2017.

== Early life and education ==
Amr has lived mostly in Virginia but also in New Jersey and the Middle East. He earned a B.A. in economics from Tufts University, before receiving an M.A. in International Affairs at Princeton University.

== Career ==
He served in the administration of Bill Clinton in the Department of Defense. He served as an appointee, at which time he served briefly at the Near East South Asia Center for Strategic Studies at National Defense University.

From 2001 to 2006, he managed an independent consulting practice, the Amr Group. He also worked for and advised the World Bank, the World Economic Forum, and other international institutions. He is a former economist and a consultant to the World Bank and the United Nations. He has written extensively about the impact of Palestinian uprisings and the prospects of peace in the region.

He is a member of the Council on Foreign Relations and previously served on Princeton University's Woodrow Wilson School of Public and International Affairs Advisory Committee. In 2002, Virginia Governor Mark Warner appointed him to serve on the Virginia Public Schools Authority, a position to which he was reappointed by Governor Tim Kaine, serving through 2010.

From 2006 to 2010, he served as a fellow at the Brookings Institution and the founding director of the Brookings Doha Center in Qatar. In 2010, he also served as a Senior Advisor in the Office of Policy at the Department of Homeland Security. From 2010 to 2013, he served as a Deputy Assistant Administrator for the Middle East at the United States Agency for International Development (USAID). He served as United States Deputy Special Envoy for Israeli-Palestinian Negotiations from 2014 to 2017, working on a team under Secretary of State John Kerry, focusing on economic issues. He joined the negotiations team in the summer of 2013.

In November 2020, Amr was named a volunteer member of the Joe Biden presidential transition Agency Review Team to support transition efforts related to the United States Department of State.

Amr is the author of publications including The Need to Communicate: How to Improve U.S. Public Diplomacy with the Islamic World and "The Opportunity of the Obama Era: How Civil Society Can Help Bridge Divides between the United States and a Diverse Muslim World" published by Brookings. He has also been published by Newsweek, The Washington Post, the International Herald Tribune, and The Daily Star. For the U.N., he authored a number of reports, including "The State of the Arab Child".

In May 2021, he was sent to the Middle East to help in trying to defuse tensions between Israel and Palestine.

Following his promotion in late 2022, he gave a press interview in which he reiterated US support for the two state solution and the reopening of the consulate general for the Palestinians in Jerusalem.
