= Sayed al-Hashim Mosque =

Mosque in Gaza, Palestine

- مسجد السيد هاشم
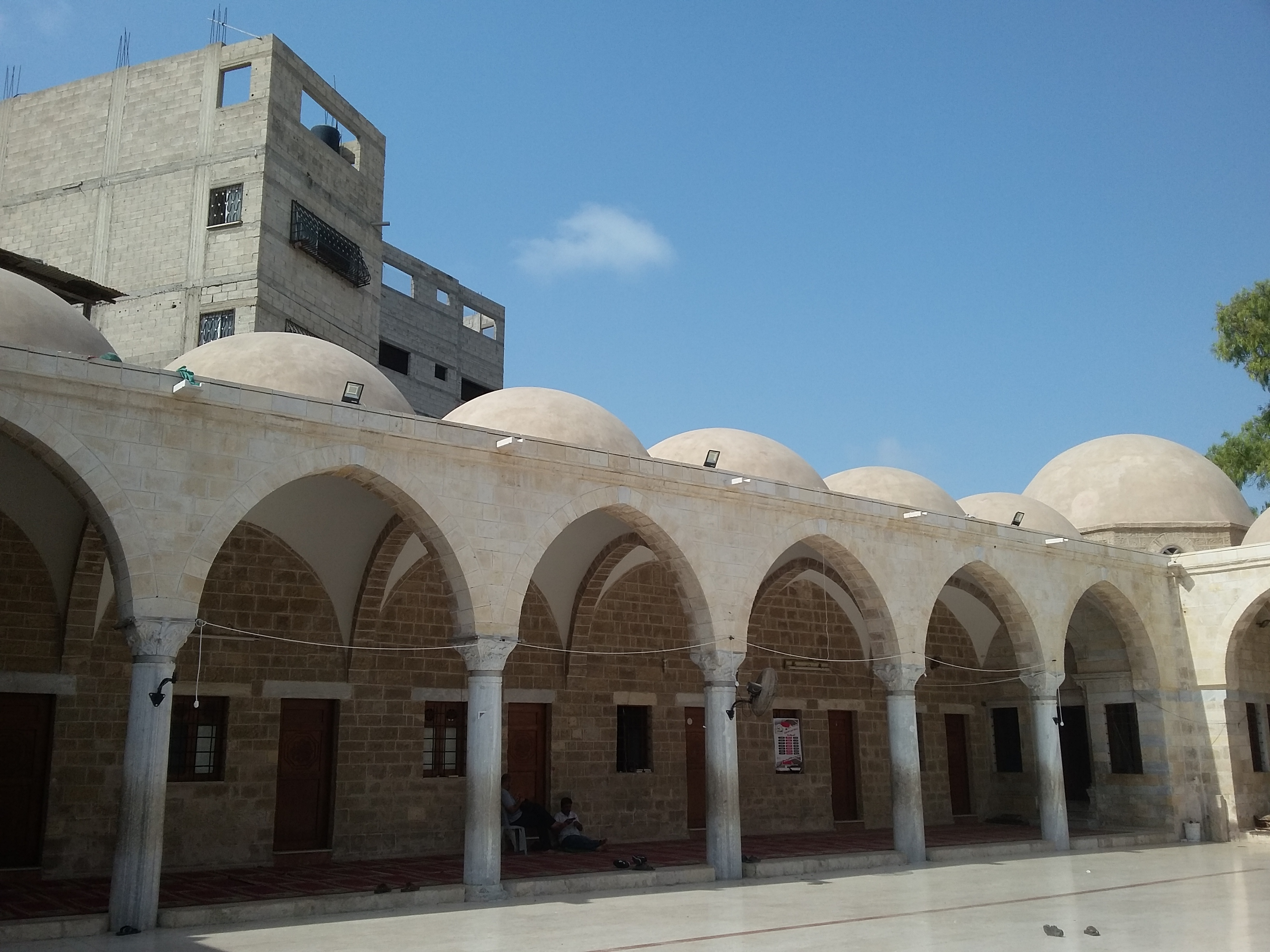
- The mosque in 2017

- Location within Gaza

Religion
- Affiliation: Islam
- Ecclesiastical or organisational status: Mosque
- Status: Active

Location
- Location: al-Wehda Street, ad-Darrāj Quarter, Old City, Gaza, Gaza Strip
- Country: Palestine
- Interactive map of Sayed al-Hashim Mosque
- Coordinates: 31°30′29″N 34°27′48″E

Architecture
- Style: Mamluk; Ottoman
- Completed: 12th century CE (prime); 1850 CE (reconstruction)

Specifications
- Dome: One (maybe more)
- Minaret: One

The Sayed al-Hashim Mosque (Arabic: مسجد السيد هاشم, romanized: Masjid as-Sayed Hāshim; Turkish: Seyyid Haşim Camii) is one of the largest and oldest mosques in Gaza, in the State of Palestine, located in the ad-Darrāj Quarter of the Old City, off al-Wehda Street. The tomb of Hashim ibn Abd al-Manaf, Muhammad's great grandfather who died in Gaza during a trading voyage, is located under the dome of the mosque according to Muslim tradition.

== Overview ==
A mosque and hostel have been located at the present site since at least the 12th century CE. The mosque had a madrasa and was a center for religious learning in the 19th and parts of the 20th century. The mosque was named after Hashim. The Sayed al-Hashim Mosque was frequented by visiting traders from Egypt, Arabia and Morocco.

The existing mosque was built in 1850, on the orders of the Ottoman sultan Abdul Majid. Some of the older materials used in the mosque’s construction were taken from the mosques and other buildings destroyed by Napoleon Bonaparte's troops. The original Ottoman minaret was rebuilt in 1903 and the north and west aisles were also built during the same period. The mausoleum of Hashim is located in the north-western corner of the mosque. The mosque was damaged as a result of an Israeli airstrike in October 2023, during the Israeli bombing of the Gaza Strip.

== See also ==
- List of mosques in Palestine
- Islam in Palestine
- Destruction of cultural heritage during the Gaza war
