= Wehda Street =

Thoroughfare that runs through central Gaza City, Palestine

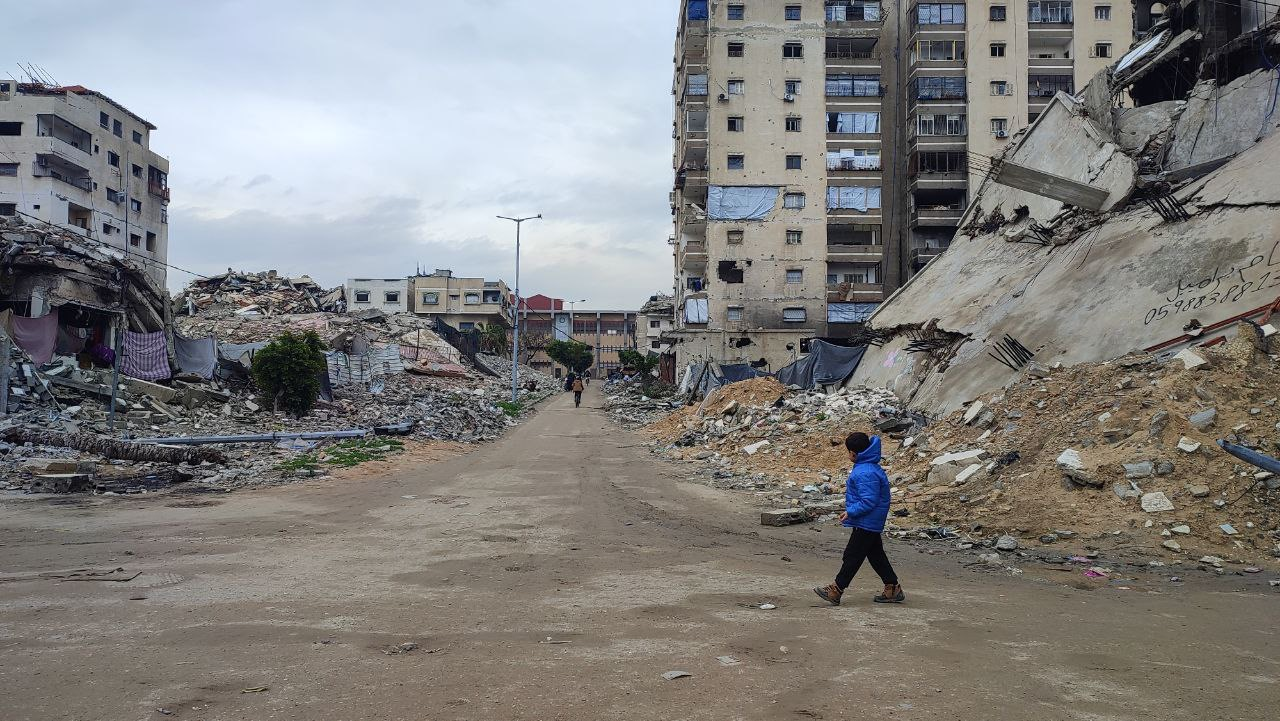
Al-Wahda Street in September 2024 during the Gaza war

Wehda Street (Arabic: شارع الوحدة), also spelled Wihda Street, is a thoroughfare that runs through central Gaza City, more or less parallel with Omar Mukhtar Street. It branches west of the main Salah al-Din Road, which runs north–south through the Gaza Strip and opens into Nasser Street just before it ends at al-Shifa Hospital. Gaza landmarks Qasr al-Basha and the Sayed Hashem Mosque are situated off Wehda Street.

On 16 May 2021, Wehda Street was bombed by the Israel Defense Forces during the 2021 Israel–Palestine crisis, killing 44 civilians. Israel said the target was a Hamas tunnel underneath the street, and accused Hamas of using civilians as human shields. Israel claimed that the tunnel, which was the military target collapsed causing nearby houses and their supporting structures to collapse as well and cause casualties, which was not the aim.

== Gallery ==
This gallery includes a collection of photos of Al-Wahda Street after it was subjected to continuous bombing by the Israeli army.

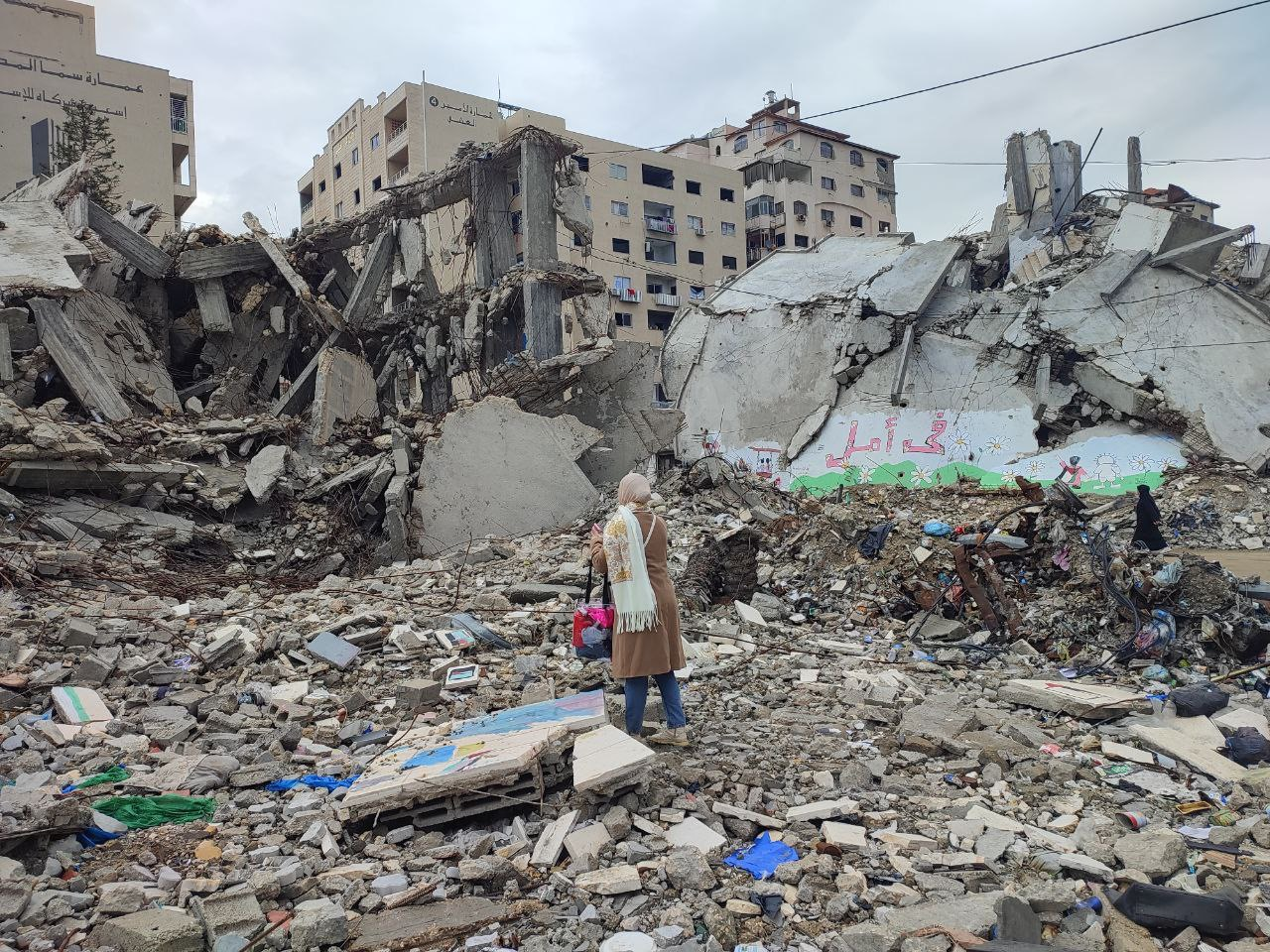

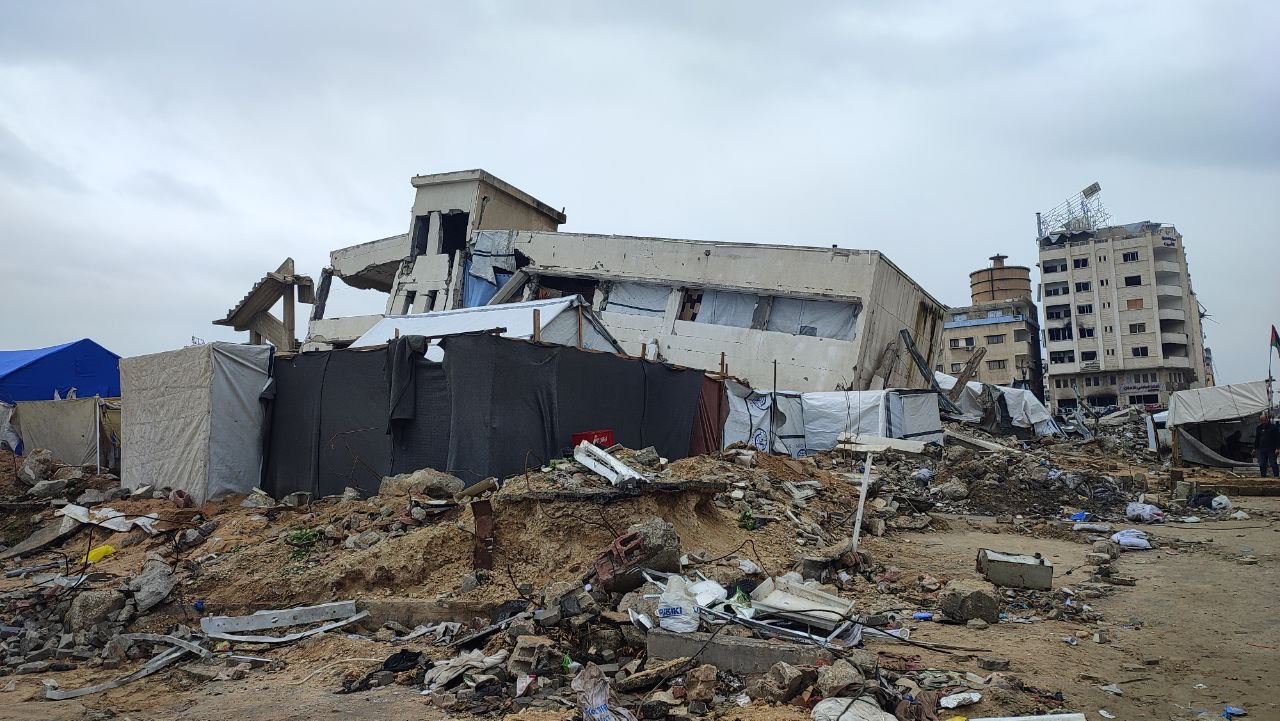

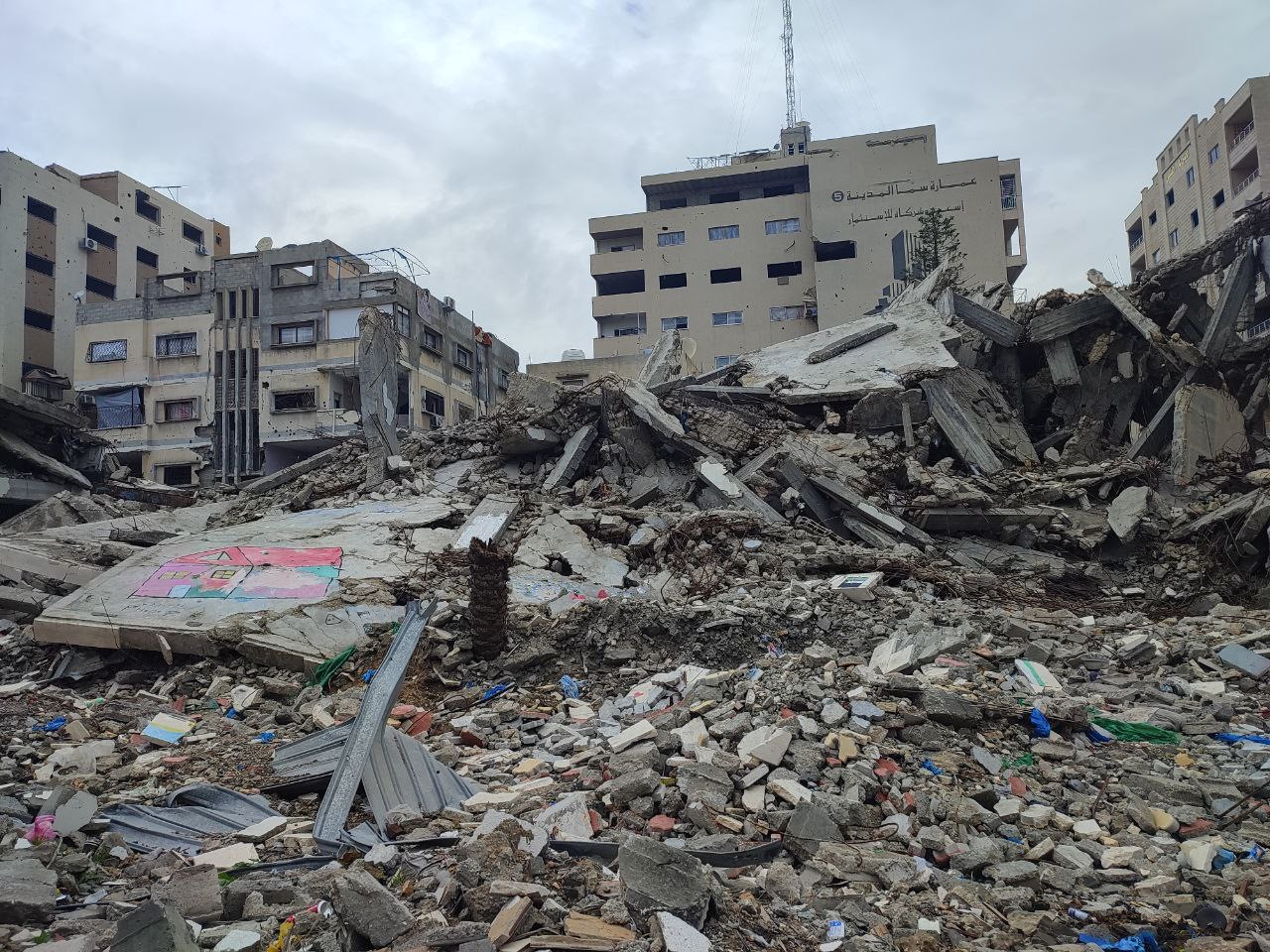

== Bibliography ==
- Winter, David (2000), Israel Handbook: With the Palestinian Authority Areas, Footprint Travel Guides, ISBN 978-1-900949-48-4
- Jacobs, Daniel (1998), Israel and the Palestinian territories, Rough Guides, ISBN 978-1-85828-248-0
