= Haviv Rettig Gur =

Israeli journalist and commentator (born 1981)

- חביב רטיג גור
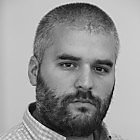
- Born: 4 April 1981 (age 45); Jerusalem, Israel
- Citizenship: Israeli
- Education: Hebrew University of Jerusalem
- Occupations: Journalist, political analyst, commentator
- Employer(s): The Times of Israel, The Free Press
- Known for: Political analysis, Israel–Diaspora commentary
- Spouse: Rachel Gur

Haviv Rettig Gur (Hebrew: חביב רטיג גור; born 4 April 1981) is an Israeli journalist, political analyst and commentator. He is senior analyst at The Times of Israel and Middle East analyst at The Free Press. His work has focused on Israeli politics, regional affairs, Jewish identity, and relations between Israel and the Jewish diaspora.

== Early life and education ==
Rettig Gur was born in Jerusalem to American-Jewish immigrants to Israel. He lived in the United States from 1989 to 1999 before returning to Israel, where he served in the Nahal Brigade of the Israel Defense Forces as a combat medic. He graduated from the Hebrew University of Jerusalem in 2010.

== Career ==
=== Journalism and the Jewish Agency ===
From 2005 to 2010, Rettig Gur worked as a journalist for The Jerusalem Post, where he covered the Jewish world, including Jewish communities outside Israel, Jewish identity, education, antisemitism and communal politics.

In June 2010, he was appointed spokesman of the Jewish Agency for Israel, becoming the agency's first native English-speaking spokesman in more than five decades. He later served as director of communications for the agency.

=== The Times of Israel ===
Rettig Gur later joined The Times of Israel, where he became senior analyst. His reporting and commentary for the publication has addressed Israeli electoral politics, Israeli society, the Israeli-Palestinian conflict, the Gaza war, Israel's relations with the United States and the Jewish diaspora, and wider Middle Eastern affairs.

He has been a regular participant in The Times of Israel podcasts and analysis formats, including episodes of Daily Briefing and What Matters Now, where he has discussed Israeli domestic politics, the Gaza war, Iran, regional diplomacy and internal social divisions in Israel.

=== The Free Press and podcasting ===
In 2025, Rettig Gur joined The Free Press as Middle East analyst. He also hosts the podcast and video series Ask Haviv Anything, which addresses questions about Israel, Jews and the Middle East.

== Public commentary ==
Rettig Gur comments frequently on Israeli politics, Jewish identity, Zionism, antisemitism, and the relationship between Israeli and diaspora Jewish communities. UCLA's Burkle Center described him as having covered Israeli politics, Israel's foreign and regional policies, and Israel's relationship with the Jewish diaspora, and noted that he has reported from more than 20 countries.

In March 2025, he delivered UCLA's 2024–25 Daniel Pearl Memorial Lecture, titled "The New Middle East".

Rettig Gur has argued that Israeli Jewish and American Jewish identities have developed in increasingly different ways. In a 2007 essay for The Jerusalem Post, he wrote that the two communities, which together constitute the majority of world Jewry, often understand Jewish identity through different historical, cultural and political frameworks.

== See also ==
- Journalism in Israel
- The Times of Israel
- Jewish Agency for Israel
