= 2021 Wehda Street airstrikes =

2021 bombing of civilian area in Gaza

Wehda Street airstrikes
- Part of the 2021 Israel–Palestine crisis
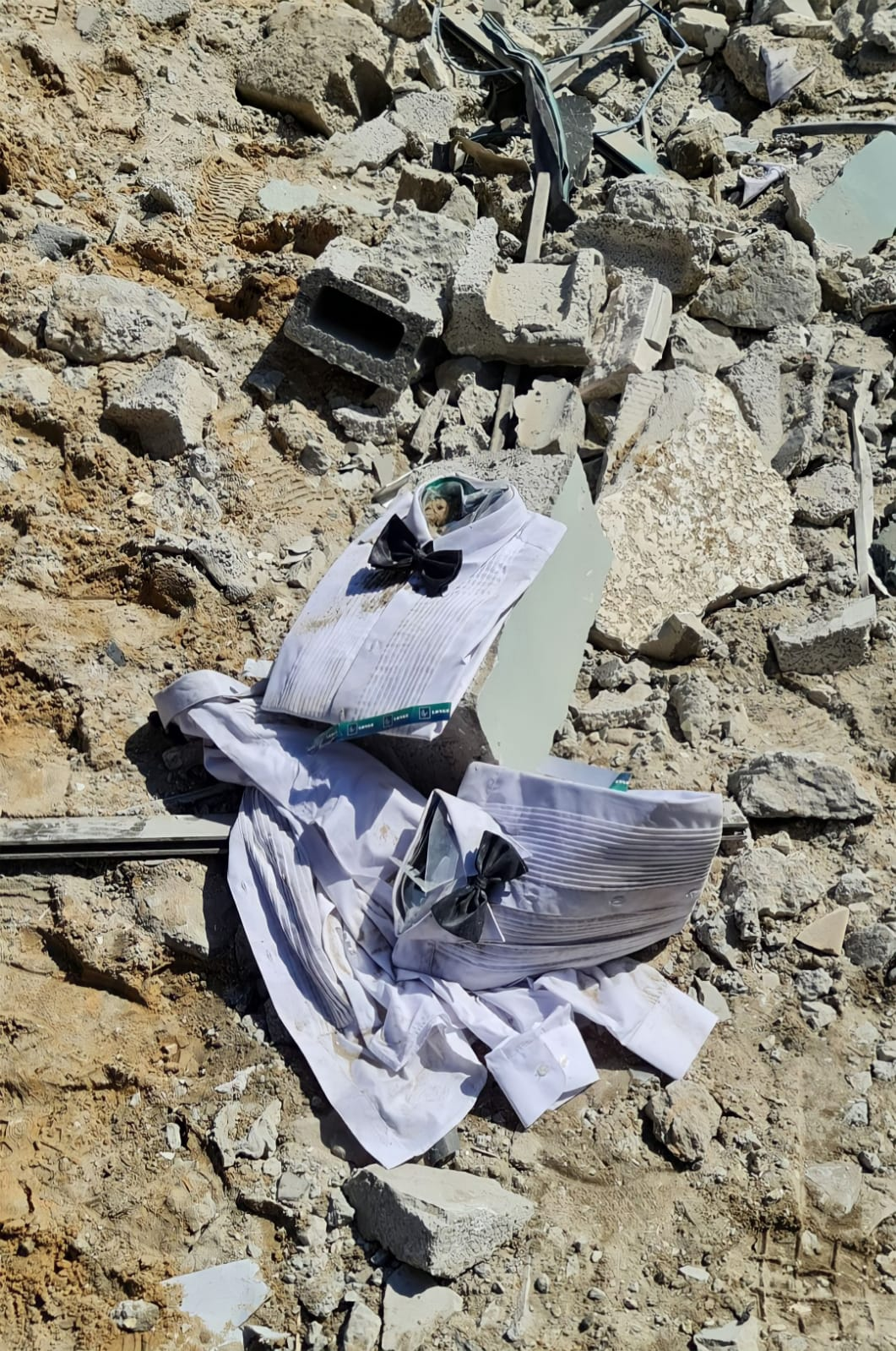
- The effects of the bombing on the shops in Al Wahda Street
- Location: 31.52°N 34.45°E; Wehda Street, Gaza Strip
- Date: May 16, 2021
- Attack type: Airstrike
- Deaths: 44 civilians
- Injuries: 50 civilians
- Perpetrator: Israel Defense Forces

The Wehda Street airstrikes, known in Palestine as the Wehda Street massacre (Arabic: مجزرة شارع الوحدة), took place on May 16, 2021, when Israeli forces bombed Wehda Street, a densely populated area located in one of Gaza's most prominent residential and commercial neighbourhoods. The bombardment was the single deadliest operation in an 11-day conflict between Israel and Gaza that erupted after weeks of turmoil in East Jerusalem. Some 44 Palestinian civilians died and approximately 50 were injured in the strike, the heaviest of many that, in exchanges between the IDF and Gaza militants, left 2500 Palestinians homeless, and displaced tens of thousands.

The incident sparked outrage internationally. Israel stated the purpose of the attack was to destroy underground military infrastructure, including a Hamas command centre, though a New York Times investigation has suggested that they did not have precise information about the location of said command centre. An IDF spokesmen later said that the collateral damage was an unforeseen 'freak' consequence of a bombing run targeting tunnels under the street, and possibly due to secondary explosions. No advanced warning was given to Palestinian civilians in the area, with Israel stating that this was because they didn't expect this level of damage.

Amnesty International, Human Rights Watch (HRW) and commentators have raised the possibility that the strike might constitute a war crime due to its disproportionate impact on civilian life. HRW also states that no evidence has been given that tunnels or an underground centre existed in the area.

== Background ==
Al-Wehda Street is located in the densely populated neighbourhood of al-Rimal in Gaza City, Palestine. The neighbourhood is largely residential and home to many of Gaza City's professionals and businesspeople, whilst also being the centre of Gaza's commercial activity. Al-Wehda Street houses heavily populated multi-storey apartment buildings, malls, banks, schools and markets. It is also the main street leading to Al-Shifa Hospital, a key centre for healthcare for the Palestinian population in the Gaza Strip.

The 11-day conflict began after protests against the possible eviction of six Palestinian families from the Sheikh Jarrah neighborhood of East Jerusalem, and subsequent incidents at Temple Mount, where Palestinians threw stones and Israeli Police subsequently raided the Al-Aqsa Mosque compound and its Jami'a Al-Aqsa. In response to these incidents, on May 10, Hamas issued an ultimatum demanding that Israel withdraw from Temple Mount and Sheikh Jarrah by 6 pm that day. When the ultimatum expired without a response, both Hamas and Palestinian Islamic Jihad launched rockets.

The crisis killed 256 in Gaza, including 128 civilians, and 13 in Israel, including 12 civilians. It also resulted in damage to infrastructure in Israel and significant damage to infrastructure in Gaza.

Following the crisis, Human Rights Watch said that it was likely that Israel committed war crimes in at least three of its strikes, including in the one on Wehda Street. They also said that Hamas committed war crimes through its firing of thousands of rockets at civilian targets. Other organizations, such as B'Tselem, have made similar statements.

== Airstrikes ==
Just after midnight on the May 16, 2021, the seventh day of the crisis, the Israeli military carried out a series of approximately 150 airstrikes on the Gaza strip, with more than 20 of those targeting the al-Rimal neighbourhood, and almost half targeting the broader Gaza city district of al-Wehda. At least 11 advanced precision guided missiles targeted points along several hundred meters of al-Wehda Street in al-Rimal, resulting in 44 dead and significant damage to the street, including to various government ministries. The IDF gave no warning or indication that they had planned to attack al-Wehda, stating that they did not anticipate civilian casualties due to their experience with previous strikes of this nature. The IDF stated that they were targeting underground military infrastructure located under the street, and that the bombs were designed to penetrate the ground first before detonating, with the additional damage possibly being due to secondary explosions from munitions stored underground. This was the deadliest night of the crisis for the Palestinians, who called it a massacre

The attack on al-Wehda Street directly brought down three residential buildings belonging to the Abu al-Ouf and al-Qawlaq families. In total, 46 people living in these buildings died. In addition to demolishing the residential buildings, the attack left many buildings surrounding al-Wehda damaged, including a clinic that treated trauma and burns.

The airstrikes on al-Wehda Street also caused major damage to infrastructure which subsequently obstructed the primary access point to al-Shifa Hospital.

== Responses ==
=== Israel's response ===
Israel said its strikes were carefully targeting Hamas tunnels and that all bombs on May 16 hit their intended targets. According to a senior Israeli military official, the destruction of the residential buildings, and the high civilian death-count was an unanticipated outcome in their mission to destroy Hamas' underground military command centre as the munition used was especially for a precise targeted attack to avoid high civilian casualty, and was likely due to a secondary explosion set off by the airstrike. He said that the collapse of the underground military target is what caused the collapse of the nearby buildings, and that the IDF had carried out similar airstrikes of a similar nature in equally dense areas, the outcomes of which saw fewer civilian casualties. It is for this reason that Israeli officials said they didn't provide any warning of the bombing. Israel has accused Hamas of "using civilians as human shields" in their hiding of its leaders and operations, which is likely in violation of the laws of war.

A New York Times investigation suggests that the IDF had limited intelligence on the target of their attack, as they did not know the size or exact location of the Hamas command centre before they bombed it. The Israeli military has not provided evidence of what it says was the Hamas command centre, whilst stating that the three affected buildings were not targeted. Human Rights Watch also reported that Israel provided no evidence for their claims and called for an International Criminal Court inquiry into this strike as an apparent war crime.

=== Hamas' response ===
Hamas, Gaza's governing body, said that its leaders are not in hiding, and thus Israel's reasons for bombing of civilian buildings suspected of hiding Hamas leaders is unjustified and untruthful. Hamas has denied the existence of underground military infrastructure in civilian areas, though, after an Israeli strike on a deserted UNRWA preparatory school in Gaza's Rimal district, UN observers discovered such infrastructure under the school. In an interview with VICE News, Hamas leader, Yahya Sinwar condemned Israel's illegal occupation of Gaza and Israel's disproportionate arsenal of weaponry in its war with Gaza and Hamas. Hamas maintains that its actions are acts of legitimate resistance of a liberation group fighting occupation.

== Munitions ==
When queried by Associated Press, the Israeli military did not respond when asked what bombs were used in the al-Wehda Street strikes.

Gaza police suggest that it is likely that GBU-31s packed with 430 kilograms of explosives were responsible for the attack on the al-Qawlaq homes and the al-Wehda attack. This bomb is the heaviest used by militaries on a regular basis, used both for large buildings and underground targets, as it is designed to carry a powerful blast. Consequently, careful intelligence and surveillance is necessary before carrying out an attack with such weapons, as the devastation is typically severe and wide-reaching within civilian areas. At least four of these bombs were dropped close to the apartment buildings. According to Gaza police investigations on the bomb fragments from al-Wehda Street, two had serial numbers "76301", identifying them as having been manufactured by Boeing in the United States. In a statement in response to questions about the bombing, Boeing said, "In accordance with U.S. law, the U.S. government authorizes and provides strict oversight for all defense exports."

Israeli military footage shows IDF troops loading Mark-80 series bombs, loaded with American-made Joint Direct Attack Munition (JDAM guidance kits), which allow bombs to strike with precision using GPS.
