= Kegham Djeghalian =

Armenian-Palestinian photographer (1915–1981)

- Born: Kegham Avedis Garabet Djeghalian; 1915; Anatolia
- Died: 1981 (aged 65–66); Gaza
- Other name: Kegham Djeghalian Sr
- Occupation: Photographer
- Spouse: Zevart Nakashian (m. 1944)
- Children: At least 2

Kegham Avedis Garabet Djeghalian (Armenian: Գեղամ Ճեղալեան and Arabic: كيغام جغليان; 1915–1981) was an Armenian-Palestinian photographer. He opened the first photography studio in Gaza in 1944, where he became known for his photographs documenting daily life and political events over four decades.

== Biography ==
Djeghalian was born in Anatolia. As a toddler, he fled to Syria, disguised as a girl with his mother and uncle as survivors of the Armenian Genocide, having lost most of his family members. However, his mother died, and Djeghalian was placed in an orphanage in Lebanon. In his teens, he moved to Palestine, where he lived in Jerusalem and Jaffa and trained in photography as an apprentice.

Upon marrying Zevart Nakashian in 1944, Djeghalian relocated to Gaza, settling in Al-Zaytoun, and opened the city's first photography studio named Photo Kegham on Omar Mokhtar Street. Local families would come to Photo Kegham to have their portraits taken, or hire Djeghalian to photograph events such as weddings and parties. Although he was Christian and barely spoke Arabic at first, Djeghalian integrated well and would enroll his children in Arabic-language schools.

Present for the social and political changes the Strip saw through the years, Djeghalian captured Gazan daily life under the British Mandate, Egyptian rule, and Israeli occupation, as well as in refugee camps that came about after the Nakba. "He was not a photojournalist. He did not work for any publication. He just had this urge to document everything", according to his grandson Kegham Djeghalian Jr. His work includes photographs of buildings and infrastructure, like train stations, that no longer exist.

In particular, Djeghalian was able to document events such as the Khan Yunis massacre and the Naksa. Notable figures Djeghalian photographed include Che Guevara during his 1959 trip to Gaza; actor Yul Brynner; Egyptian leaders Farouk, Naguib, Nasser, and Sadat; and Indian Prime Minister Jawaharlal Nehru as Indian troops were serving in the UN Force.

While his family left for Egypt in light of the 1967 Six-Day War, Djeghalian decided to stay in Gaza as "He loved Palestine. He loved Gaza. It was his home." Around that time, Djeghalian worked with other Armenian photographers in the West Bank to send negatives to Egyptian intelligence. He earned the nickname Al Musawer Al Fedai (the Guerrilla Photographer).

== Legacy ==
After his death in 1981, Studio Photo Kegham passed to Djeghalian's assistant Maurice/Morris Tarazi and later to Tarazi's brother Marwan Tarazi (who was killed in the 2023 Church of Saint Porphyrius airstrike). Djeghalian is well remembered among Gazan Palestinians, both in Gaza and the diaspora.

In 2020, Djeghalian and his photography were the subject of a Deutsche Welle (DW) documentary titled Preserving Gaza's photographic history, directed by Tania Krämer and featuring interviews with archivist Marwan Tarazi, Djeghalian's daughter Anahid Boutin, photographer Shareef Sarhan, and music producer Ayman Mghamis. The following year, an Arabic-language documentary from Al Jazeera titled Gaza's First Photographer: Kegham Djeghalian, directed by Marwa Jabara Tibi, won the Bronze Prize at the Jordan Arab Media Festival.

Djeghalian's grandson Kegham Djeghalian Jr., an artist, creative director, and academic, discovered a box of Djeghalian Sr's negatives at his father's apartment in 2018 and took them back to Paris to develop them. In 2021, he curated an exhibition titled Photo Kegham of Gaza: Unboxing for Cairo Photo Week at the Rawabet Art Space. He emphasised the theme of "a disrupted history", a frustration shared by Palestinians and Armenians. One of the burdens of going through this work, he said, is the potential for what remained of it in Gaza to be lost.

Djeghalian Jr and journalist Dana Al-Sheikh in October 2023 complained that Vice had re-published their 2021 interview about Photo Kegham of Gaza: Unboxing in a way that pushed "Zionist narratives", such as adding context about Hamas taking power, which did not occur until decades after Djeghalian Sr's death. Al-Sheikh called it "blatant forgery. The images tell the story of Palestine and the possibilities of Palestinian life, free of occupation."

The photographs are being displayed at the Photographers' Gallery in London in 2024 in partnership with the Barakat Trust and the Armenian Institute, as well as the University of Amsterdam's Spui25. Djeghalian Jr gave a talk in conversation with Rachel Dedman at the former and Özge Calafato and Karène Sanchez Summerer at the latter. Photo Kegham was replicated for the 2025 Sharjah Biennal.
