= Great Mosque of Gaza =

Destroyed mosque in Gaza, Palestine

- المسجد غزة الكبير
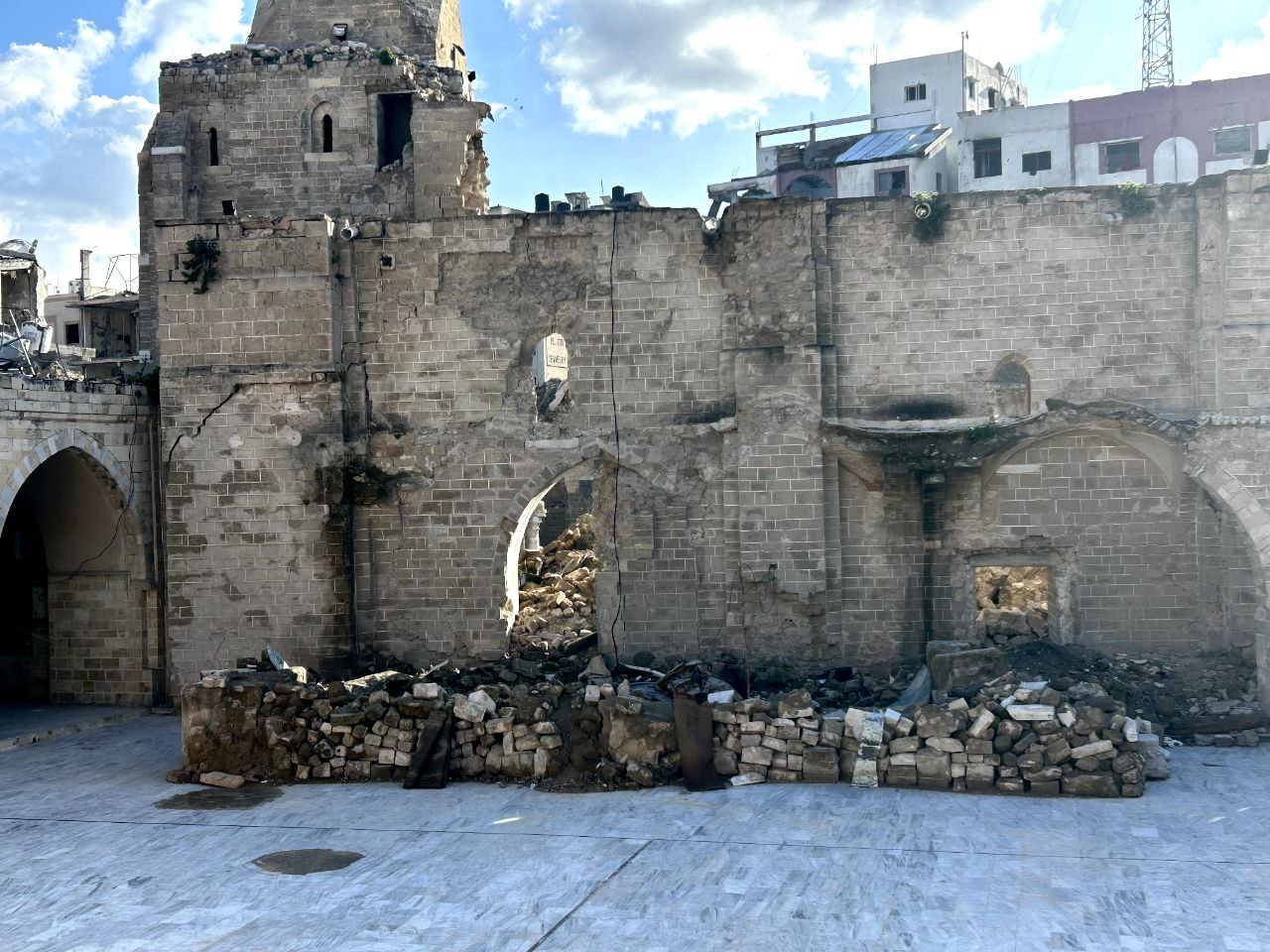
- Ruins of Great Mosque of Gaza in 2025

- Location of the destroyed mosque in Gaza

Religion
- Affiliation: Islam (former)
- Ecclesiastical or organisational status: Mosque ( –2023)
- Status: Destroyed by Israeli bombing (partial ruinous state)

Location
- Location: Omar Mukhtar Street, al-Daraj, Gaza Strip
- Country: Palestine
- Interactive map of Great Mosque of Gaza
- Coordinates: 31°30′15.13″N 34°27′52.08″E

Architecture
- Style: Mamluk, Italian Gothic
- Completed: 7th century (original); 1340 CE (rebuilt); c. 1650 (restored)
- Demolished: December 7, 2023 (partial destruction)

Specifications
- Minaret: 1
- Materials: Sandstone (exterior structure), marble and plaster tiles (entrance and interior structure), olive wood

Website
- Official website

The Great Mosque of Gaza, (Note: Arabic: المسجد غزة الكبير, transliteration: al-Masjid Ghazza al-Kabīr) also known as the Great Omari Mosque, (Note: Arabic: المسجد العمري الكبير transliteration: al-Masjid al-ʿUmarī al-Kabīr) is a mosque in a ruinous state, located in Gaza City, in the State of Palestine. Prior to its 2023 partial destruction, it was the largest and oldest mosque in the Gaza Strip.

Believed to stand on the site of an ancient Philistine temple, the site was used by the Byzantines to erect a church in the 5th century. After the Rashidun conquest in the 7th century, it was transformed into a mosque. The Great Mosque's minaret was toppled in an earthquake in 1033. In 1149, the Crusaders built a large church. It was mostly destroyed by the Ayyubids in 1187, and then rebuilt as a mosque by the Mamluks in the early 13th century.

It was destroyed by the Mongols in 1260, then soon restored. It was destroyed by an earthquake at the end of the century. The Great Mosque was restored again by the Ottomans roughly 300 years later. Severely damaged after British bombardment during World War I, the mosque was restored in 1925 by the Supreme Muslim Council. In 2023, during the Gaza war and Gaza genocide, it was destroyed by the Israeli bombing of the Gaza Strip, leaving most of the structure collapsed and the minaret partially destroyed.

== Location ==
The Great Mosque is situated in the Daraj Quarter of the Old City in Downtown Gaza at the eastern end of Omar Mukhtar Street, southeast of Palestine Square. Gaza's Gold Market is located adjacent to it on the south side. To the northeast is the Katib al-Wilaya Mosque. To the east, on Wehda Street, is a girls' school.

== History ==
=== Legendary Philistine roots ===
According to tradition, the mosque stands on the site of the Philistine temple dedicated to Dagon—the god of fertility—which Samson toppled in the Book of Judges. Later, a temple dedicated to Marnas—god of rain and grain—was erected. Local legend today claims that Samson is buried under the present mosque.

=== Byzantine church ===
A Christian basilica was built on the site in the 5th century CE, either during the reign of Eastern Roman Empress Aelia Eudocia, or Emperor Marcianus. In either event, the basilica was finished and appeared on the 6th-century Madaba Map of the Holy Land.

=== Early Muslim mosque ===
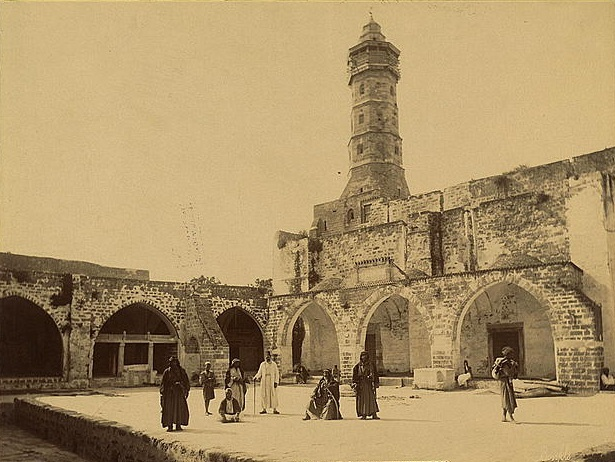
Courtyard, arcades and minaret of the mosque, late 19th century

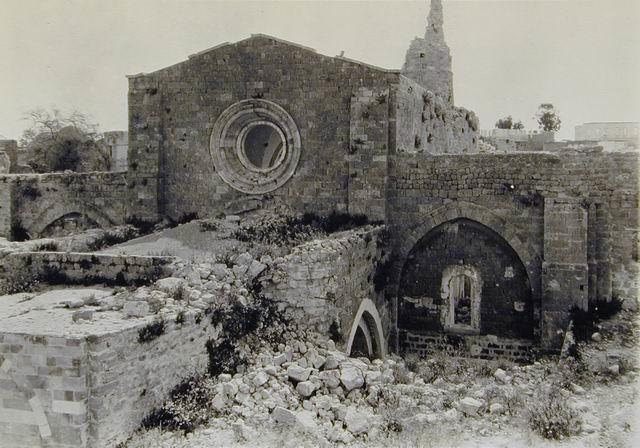
The West facade of the Great Mosque reflects Crusader architectural style. Picture taken after British bombardment in 1917

The Byzantine church was transformed into a mosque in the 7th century by Omar ibn al-Khattab's generals, after the conquest of Roman Palaestina by the Rashidun Caliphate. The mosque is still alternatively named "al-Omari", in honour of Omar ibn al-Khattab who was caliph during the Muslim conquest of Palestine. In 985, during Abbasid rule, Arab geographer al-Muqaddasi wrote that the Great Mosque was a "beautiful mosque." On 5 December 1033, an earthquake caused the pinnacle of the mosque's minaret to collapse.

=== Crusader church ===
In 1149, the Crusaders, who had conquered Gaza in 1100, built a large church atop the ruins of the earlier Byzantine church upon a decree by Baldwin III of Jerusalem. However, in William of Tyre's descriptions of grand Crusader churches, it is not mentioned. Of the Great Mosque's three aisles today, it is believed that portions of two of them had formed part of the Crusader church.

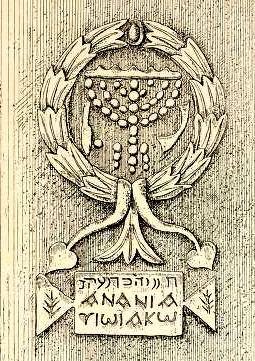
Engraving of Jewish Menorah and an ancient Hebrew inscription, which have been erased

Based on a Jewish bas-relief accompanied by a Hebrew and Greek inscription carved on the upper tier of one of the building's columns, it was suggested in the late 19th century that the upper pillars of the building were brought from a 3rd-century Jewish synagogue in Caesarea Maritima. The discovery of a 6th-century synagogue at Maiumas, the ancient port of Gaza, in the 1960s make local re-use of this column much likelier. The relief on the column depicted Jewish cultic objects - a menorah, a shofar, a lulav and etrog - surrounded by a decorative wreath, and the inscription read "Hananyah son of Jacob" in both Hebrew and Greek. Above it was carved a menorah with a shofar on one side and an etrog on the other. During the late 19th century, the column was part of an old synagogue in Caesarea Maritima and was brought to the mosque for its perceived religious value, as the Caesarea church had appeared in the Madaba Map. The fact that this Jewish symbol was preserved throughout the decades inside the mosque was described as demonstrating "peaceful coexistence" by scholar Ziad Shehada.

In 1187, the Ayyubids, under Saladin wrested control of Gaza from the Crusaders and destroyed the church.

=== Mamluk mosque ===
The Mamluks reconstructed the mosque in the 13th century. In 1260, the Mongols destroyed it. It was rebuilt, but in 1294, an earthquake caused its collapse. Extensive renovations centered on the iwan were undertaken by the governor Sunqur al-Ala'i during the sultanate of Husam ad-Din Lajin between 1297 and 1299. A later Mamluk governor of the city, Sanjar al-Jawli, commissioned the restoration of the Great Mosque sometime between 1311 and 1319.

The Mamluks rebuilt the mosque completely in 1340. In 1355, Muslim geographer Ibn Battuta noted the mosque's former existence as "a fine Friday mosque," and said that al-Jawli's mosque was "well-built." Inscriptions on the mosque bear the signatures of the Mamluk sultans al-Nasir Muhammad (dated 1340), Qaitbay (dated May 1498), Qansuh al-Ghawri (dated 1516), and the Abbasid caliph al-Musta'in Billah (dated 1412).

=== Ottoman period ===
In the 16th century, the mosque was restored after apparent damage in the previous century. The Ottomans commissioned its restoration and built six other mosques in the city. They had been in control of Palestine since 1517. The interior bears an inscription of the name of the Ottoman governor of Gaza, Musa Pasha, brother of deposed Husayn Pasha, dating from 1663.

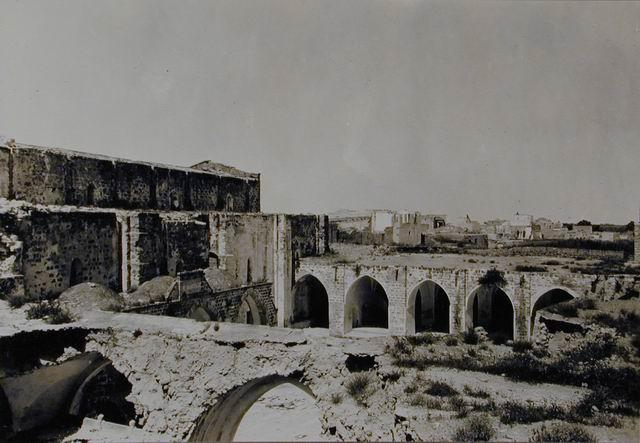
An exterior view of the mosque in the early 20th century, before renovation

Some Western travelers in the late 19th century reported that the Great Mosque was the only structure in Gaza worthy of historical or architectural note. The Great Mosque was severely damaged by Allied forces while attacking the Ottoman positions in Gaza during World War I. The British claimed that Ottoman munitions were stored in the mosque which exploded in the bombardment.

=== British Mandate ===
Under the supervision of former Gaza mayor Sa'id al-Shawwa, it was restored by the Supreme Muslim Council in 1926-27.

In 1928, the Supreme Muslim Council held a mass demonstration of Muslims and Christians at the Great Mosque in support for boycotting elections and participation in the Legislative Assembly of the British Mandate of Palestine government. To increase the number of people in the rally, they ordered all the mosques in one of Gaza's quarters to temporarily close.

=== Post-1948 ===
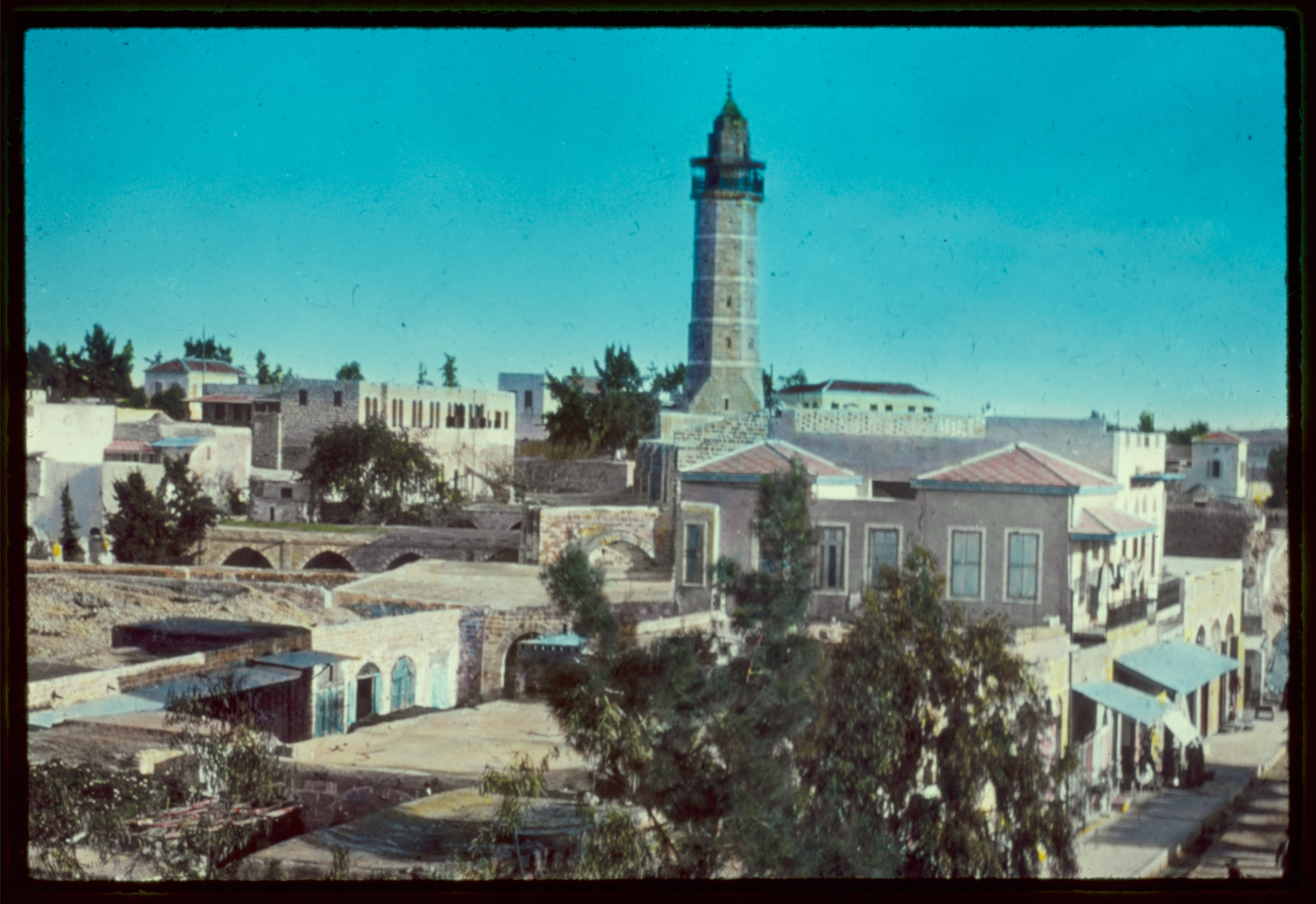
The mosque in the 1950s or 1960s.

The ancient inscriptions and bas-relief of Jewish religious symbols were chiseled away intentionally between 1973 and 1993. During the Battle of Gaza between the Palestinian organizations of Hamas and Fatah, the mosque's pro-Hamas imam Mohammed al-Rafati was shot dead by Fatah gunmen on 12 June 2007, in retaliation for the killing of an official of Mahmoud Abbas's presidential guard by Hamas earlier that day. In 2019–2020, 211 manuscripts in the library's collection were digitised in collaboration with the British Library.

==== Gaza war and genocide ====
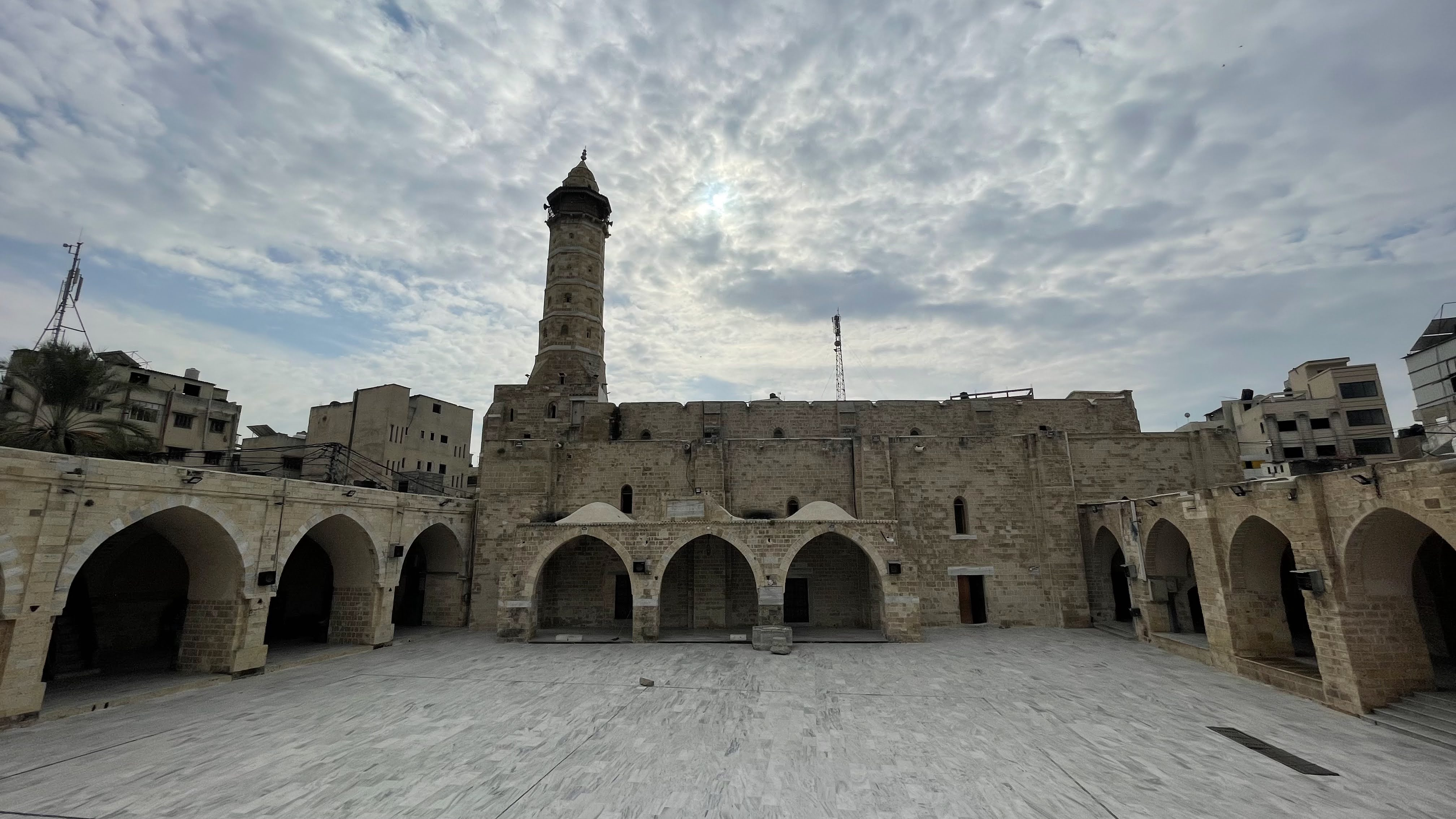
The Great Mosque in 2021, before its destruction in 2023 by the Israeli bombings

The mosque was heavily damaged, with some sources describing it as destroyed, by Israeli bombardment during the Gaza war and Gaza genocide. The Israeli military said that it attacked “a Hamas military compound and an anti-tank missile array” at the site. It said it attacked a militant tunnel at the Omari mosque. It did not provide proof in either case. Photographs show the central section of the mosque fully collapsed, with its minaret partially toppled. While Gaza was under Israeli fire, Palestinians recovered some of the manuscripts from the mosque. By January 2024 UNESCO had confirmed damage to the mosque through remote assessment of the war's impact on heritage sites in Gaza; by February 2026 UNESCO had identified damage at more than 150 sites in the Gaza Strip.

After the January 2025 ceasefire agreement, Palestinians near the area started to restore the mosque. Work resumed after the October ceasefire began, with work focusing on clearing rubble with repairs waiting until supplies enter Gaza. Previous work digitising manuscripts in the library's collection meant that many were stored in resilient containers and 148 out of 228 manuscripts survived.

== Architecture ==
Plan of the mosque

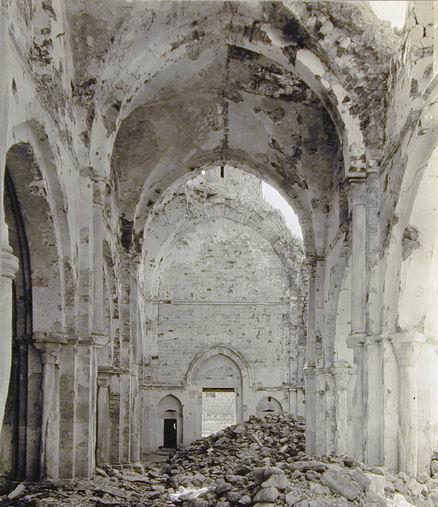
The central section of the mosque, looking west, after the 1917 British bombardment

The Great Mosque has an area of 4,100 square metres (44,000 sq ft). Most of the general structure is constructed from local marine sandstone known as kurkar. The mosque forms a large sahn ("courtyard") surrounded by rounded arches. The Mamluks, and later the Ottomans, had the south and southeastern sides of the building expanded.

Over the door of the mosque is an inscription containing the name of Mamluk sultan Qalawun and there are also inscriptions containing the names of the sultans Lajin and Barquq.

=== Interior ===
Sectional plan across the mosque

When the building was transformed from a church into a mosque, most of the previous Crusader construction was completely replaced, but the mosque's facade with its arched western entrance is a typical piece of Crusader ecclesiastical architecture, and columns within the mosque compound still retain their Italian Gothic style. One of the columns was reused from an ancient synagogue.

Internally, the wall surfaces are plastered and painted. Marble is used for the western door and the western facade's oculus. The floors are covered with glazed tiles. The columns are also made of marble and their capitals are built in Corinthian style.

The central nave is groin-vaulted, each bay being separated from one another by pointed transverse arches with rectangular profiles. The nave arcades are carried on cruciform piers with an engaged column on each face, sitting on a raised plinth. The two aisles of the mosque are also groin-vaulted. Ibn Battuta noted that the Great Mosque had a white marble minbar ("pulpit"); it still exists today. There is a small mihrab in the mosque with an inscription dating from 1663, containing the name of Musa Pasha, a governor of Gaza during Ottoman rule.

=== Minaret ===
The mosque is well known for its minaret, which is square-shaped in its lower half and octagonal in its upper half, typical of Mamluk architectural style. The minaret is constructed of stone from the base to the upper, hanging balcony, including the four-tiered upper half. The pinnacle is mostly made of woodwork and tiles, and is frequently renewed. A simple cupola springs from the octagonal stone drum and is of light construction similar to most mosques in the Levant. The minaret stands on what was the end of the eastern bay of the Crusader church. Its three semicircular apses were transformed into the base of the minaret.

== Library ==
Before the Gaza genocide, the library of the mosque was the third largest in Palestine, holding around 20,000 volumes including 187 manuscripts, some of which were centuries old and among them, "irreplaceable original materials, including works on jurisprudence, geography and social life, many of which recorded details of Palestinian territories and life before 1948". As of May 2026 a team of volunteer women, coordinated by Gaza City's Eyes on Heritage Institute, are working to recover and restore what remains of the library's contents, without no specialist resources in a mission they describe as "first aid". Haneen al-Amasi, the Institute's director visited the site during a March 2025 ceasefire and found “Entire archives of books, manuscripts and historical documents [...] burned or shattered in Israeli attacks,” and “many others were damaged, eaten by rodents, or taken by displaced people to be used as fuel amid severe gas shortages in Gaza.” With no safe alternative space to store the books (the Institute's offices having been bombed by Israel most recently in September 2025), the volunteers have set aside a small corner of the damaged library, though this remains exposed to damage from the elements.

Haneen describes the work as motivated by a belief that “Future generations in Palestine will ask what we did to preserve our history.” She also cites the pre-Genocide reading competitions that children in Gaza took part in eagerly, "By saving these books, we are trying to ensure that when the war ends, our children have something to read other than news of death."

== See also ==
- Attacks on religious sites during the Gaza war
- Conversion of non-Islamic places of worship into mosques
- Destruction of cultural heritage during the Gaza war
- Islam in Palestine
- List of archaeological sites in the Gaza Strip
- List of churches in Palestine
  - Church of Saint Porphyrius, second Crusader-built church in Gaza
- List of mosques in Palestine
  - Sayed al-Hashim Mosque, Gaza
