= Palestine Square =

City square in Gaza City, Palestine

- Interactive map of Palestine Square
- 31°30′22″N 34°27′42″E
- Location: Gaza City, Palestine

Palestine Square (Arabic: ميدان فلسطين, romanized: Mīdān Falastīn), also known as Al-Saha or As-Saha (Arabic: الساحة, "the (community) space" or "the square"), is a city square in east-central Gaza City, Palestine, in between Jamal Abdel Nasser Street and Omar Mukhtar Street. It is the location of a bus station, a taxi station, a fruit market, the Al-Ahli Arab Hospital, and dozens of small shops and vendors. Gaza's municipal headquarters is also located in the square. Palestine Square once was walled when it laid along the southern edge of the Old City, overlooking barley and vegetable farms, olive and almond groves.

== History ==
During the construction of a shopping centre in 2016 the remnants of a Byzantine church were discovered.

=== Gaza war ===
On December 7, 2023, during the fighting in the Gaza war, the Israel Defense Forces conquered Palestine Square. On November 30, 2023, a week prior to the occupation, Hamas used Palestine Square as the venue for the release of some of the hostages it was holding.

On January 25, 2025, Hamas used the square to stage the release of four Israeli female soldiers held as hostage since October 7, 2023. It was the second round of hostage release as spelled out in the 2025 ceasefire deal between Hamas and Israel.

== Bibliography ==
- Jacobs, Daniel (1998), Israel and the Palestinian territories, Rough Guides, ISBN 978-1-85828-248-0
- Doughty, Dick; El Aydi, Mohammed (1995), Gaza: legacy of occupation-a photographer's journey, Kumarian Press, Inc., ISBN 9781565490444
