= Jamal Abdel Nasser Street =

Street in Gaza City, Gaza Strip, Palestine

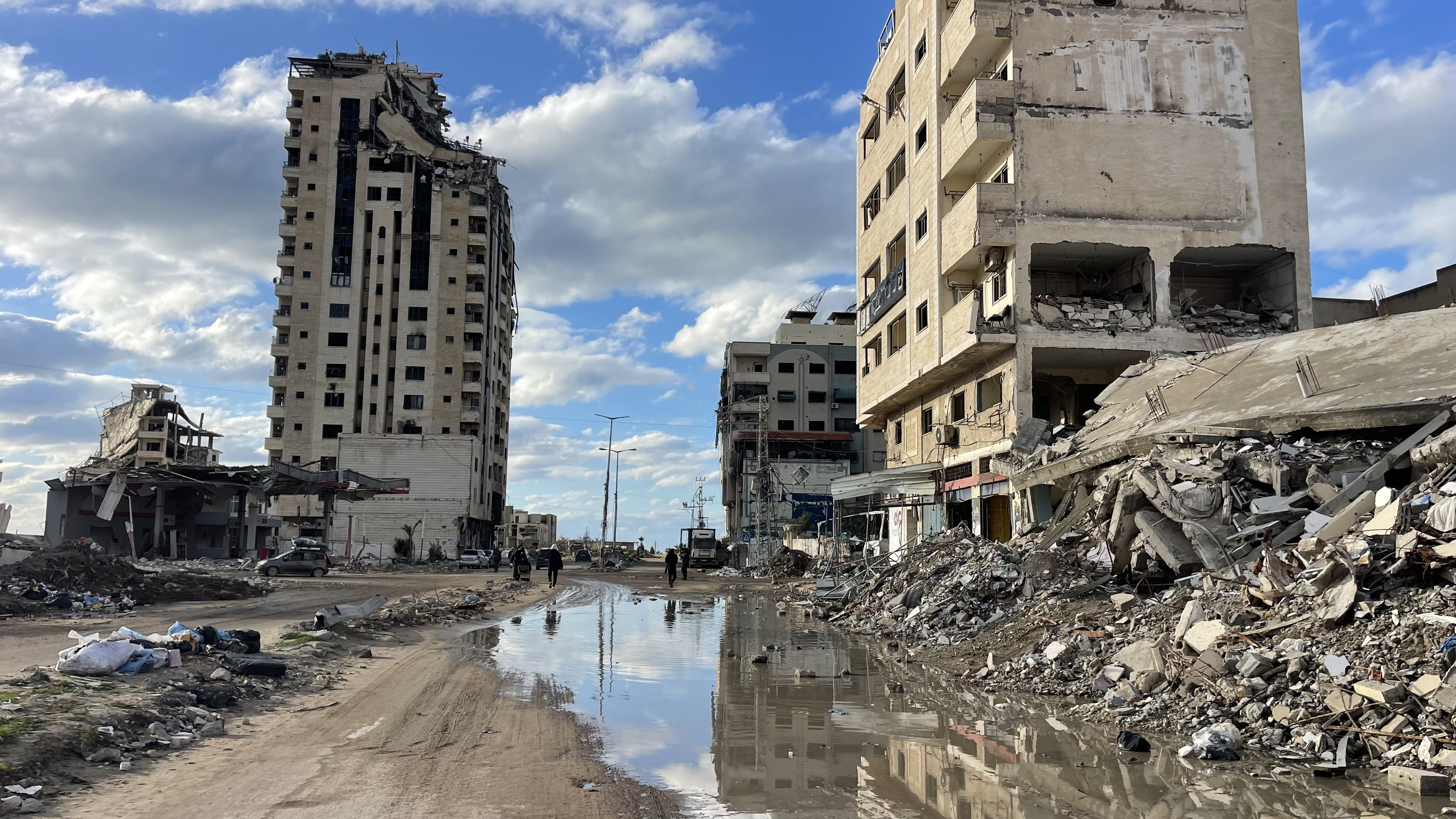
The street in February 2025. The Mushtaha tower (left) was destroyed by the IDF just over six months later.

Jamal Abdel Nasser Street (also spelled Gamal Abdel Nasser Street and alternatively known as Thalatheny Street; Arabic: شارع جمال عبد الناصر) is a major street in Gaza City, Palestine. It starts in the Old City branching off of Ni'im al-Din al-Arabi Street and runs north into Rimal where it connects to Ahmed Orabi Street, the main coastal highway. It runs parallel to Omar Mukhtar Street.

The street was named after the late president of Egypt and pan-Arabist leader Gamal Abdel Nasser. The unofficial, but common local name is Thalatheny Street, which is named after the Thalatheny clan who have historically lived in that area.

Major buildings located along Jamal Abdel Nasser Street include the Gaza headquarters of the United Nations Relief and Works Agency (UNRWA), the al-Azhar University and the Islamic University of Gaza. In 2009, a cafe on the street was targeted and destroyed by Israeli warplanes.

During the Israeli invasion of the Gaza Strip, the street was subjected to heavy Israeli artillery fire and became an epicenter for IDF tanks.
