= Zeitoun killings =

Israeli attack on Palestinian civilians in the Gaza War (2008–2009)

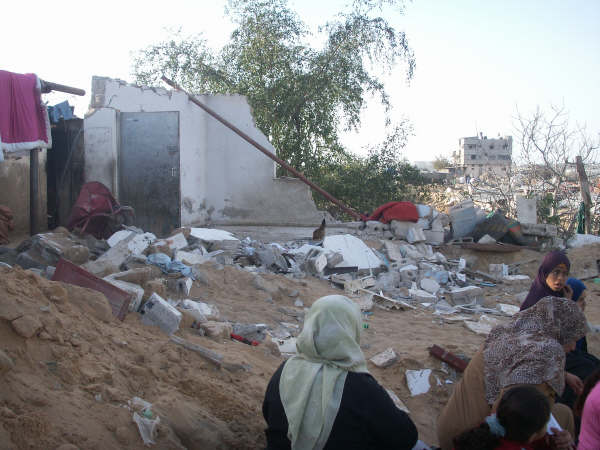
- Zeitoun neighborhood after attacks
- Location: 31.496°N 34.456°E; Zeitoun, Gaza
- Date: Started 4 January 2009
- Deaths: 48 residents of Zeitoun
- Perpetrator: Israel Defense Forces

The Zeitoun killings refer to the Israeli military incursion, led by the Givati Brigade unit of the Israel Defense Forces (IDF), into the Zeitoun district of Gaza as part of the three-week 2008–09 Gaza War. In the Arab world, it is referred to as the Zeitoun District Massacre (Arabic: مجزرة حي الزيتون). A total of 48 residents of Zeitoun were killed, most of them women, children, and the elderly; 27 homes, a mosque and a number of farms were destroyed by Israeli forces.

The New York Times reported that during the three-week conflict "few neighborhoods suffered more than Zeitoun." A report released by United Nations Office for Humanitarian Affairs stated that the attack on the Samouni family, who were among the Zeitoun victims, was one of the "gravest incidents" in the conflict. According to Haaretz, the IDF delayed rescue services from reaching some of the casualties for three days of the incident.

Zeitoun residents believed that because the area is a natural choke point where the Gaza Strip narrows to just four miles wide, Israeli troops turned their neighborhoods into a military base from which to launch their operations. The IDF has refused to discuss individual charges in detail, but an army spokesman speaking on the condition of anonymity with The Los Angeles Times said, "As a matter of policy, we do not target civilians." He added, "These situations are very complex and our soldiers do the best they can."

Lt. Col. (ret.) Jonathan D. Halevi of the Jerusalem Center for Public Affairs, an Israeli think tank and advocacy organisation, said that printed flyers from Palestinian Islamic Jihad and its associated websites named five members of the Samouni extended family as being affiliated with the group in some role. Halevi also states that militants from that organisation were operating in the area around the time Israeli tanks began shelling the group of homes belonging to the Samouni extended family.

According to the New York Times, members of the Samouni family "did not deny that Hamas militants operated in the area. A family member said there was no active Hamas resistance in the immediate vicinity, although militants were firing rockets at Israel a little more than a mile away." Newsweek reported that the survivors of Zeitoun all insisted that they were simply farmers and that their area had never been used to fire rockets.

== The Samouni family ==
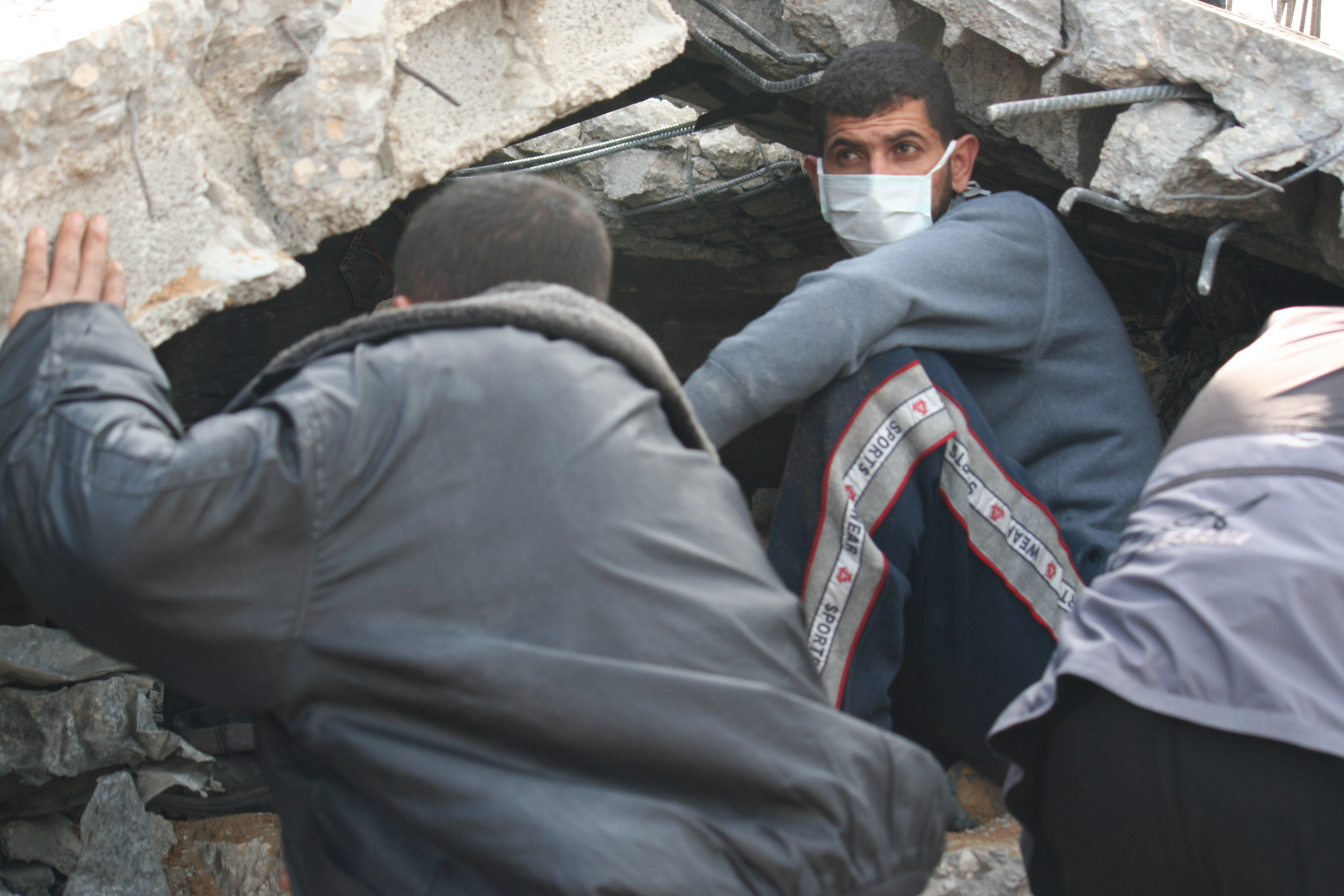
"Paramedics and workers dig through the rubble of the Samouni household in Zeitoun looking for bodies. The stench was unbearable. That day they pulled out many bodies."

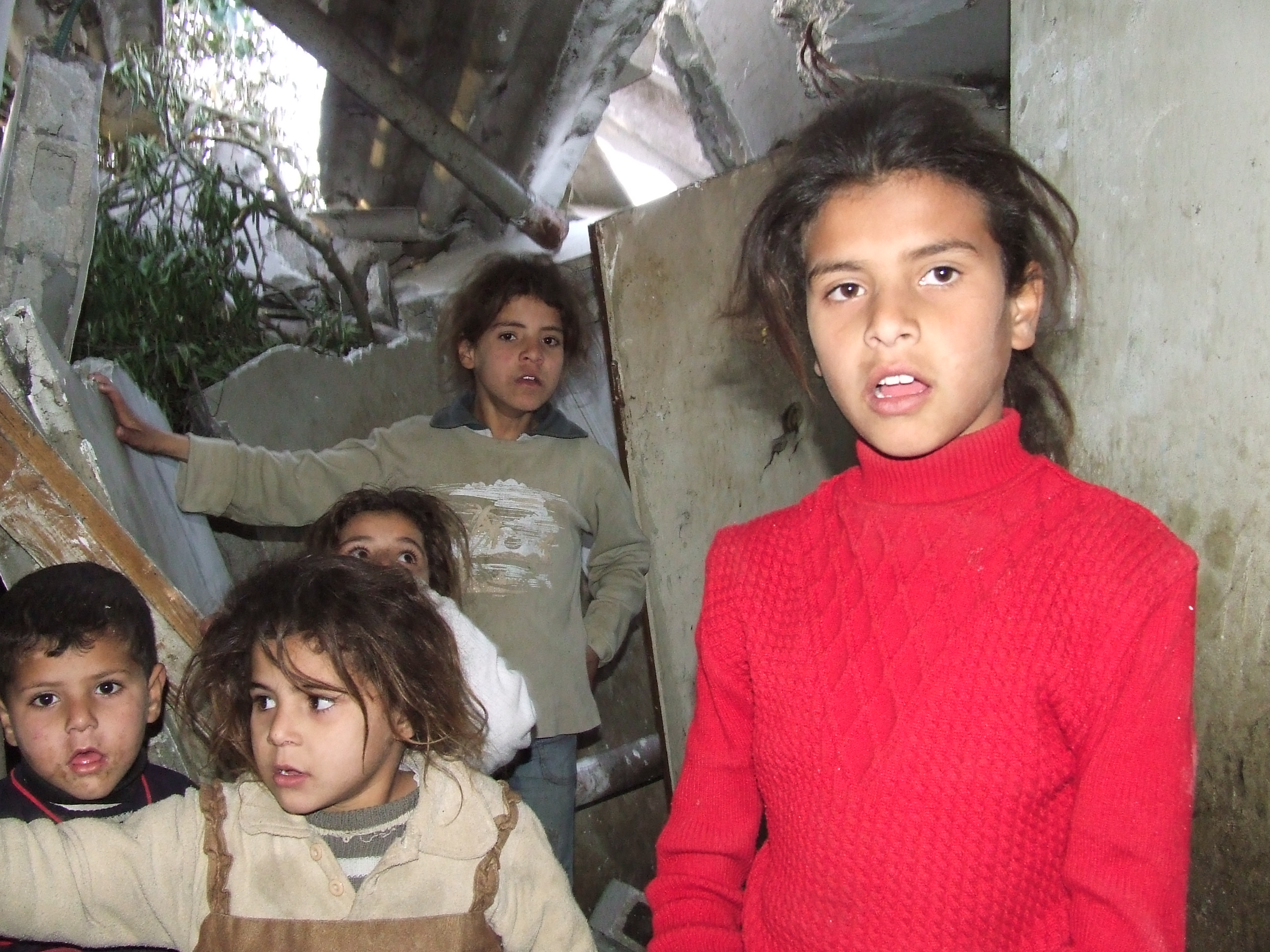
Ten-year-old Mona Al-Samouni lost both her parents in the attack.

According to accounts by family members, on January 4, 2009, the first day of the Israeli incursion in the Zeitoun district, the Samouni clan were ordered out of their houses (most of them were later demolished) by Israeli soldiers and told to gather in a nearby home. They were forced to move again to another building, with over 100 members in one home. On January 5, Israelis began demolishing the wall of the house. According to eyewitnesses, when one of the occupants went to alert the Israeli soldiers that people were inside, including women and children, the soldiers began to shoot at the house. After a short lull, the house was shelled and hit by missiles fired by the Israeli Air Force, severely damaging the building and killing and injuring the occupants.

A total of 49 members of the Samouni extended family were killed, according to The Daily Telegraph and The Guardian newspapers, reporting from Zeitoun, while Newsweek divided the number killed into 29 family members and 19 others. Articles in Haaretz say just 21 family members were killed, and do not mention other deaths. A large number of the dead were women and children; the Telegraph reported that the dead were, "mostly women, children and elderly".

Members of the Samouni family had been sheltering in one of the house, trying to avoid attracting the attention of Israeli soldiers who were in the area, who had previously gathered them into that particular house. On Monday morning, January 5, 2009, four men left the house to gather firewood for cooking. Next to the house was a small wooden structure, and the men had reportedly begun climbing on this to take the boards apart. This activity was seen in aerial drone photographs, and the poles that the men were carrying were mistakenly identified as rocket-propelled grenades by an Israeli Givati Brigade commander operating from a remote location. One soldier later testified to Breaking the Silence that soldiers had received information that a rocket-propelled grenade squad were located in the area. On seeing the drone photographs, the Israeli commander called for a missile strike against the men outside the house; they ran into the Samouni house for shelter, which was then struck twice with subsequent missile fire.

Another attack on family members was reported to have occurred in the house across the street on January 4. According to one of the local residents, Israeli soldiers came to her house where she and 18 other family members were sheltering from the fighting outside, and deliberately shot at her family members. According to a report from Newsweek, published online in The Daily Beast, Zahwa Samouni, and her son Faraj, said that prior to the alleged shooting, her husband presented his ID to the IDF and identified himself as the owner of the house. After he told them that he has children and pleaded for them to hold their fire, they shot him repeatedly, about 20–30 times, "I don't know how many" according to witnesses. He along with his four-year-old son were killed.

In another incident, a witness reported that after forcing 45 members of the Samouni family into one room, the IDF blindfolded and cuffed eight male members of the family and subsequently interrogated them. The family were then ordered outside, and three of the men were ordered by soldiers to "walk to Gaza City" and to not "come back". During the pleas of the men's wives, a soldier shot one of the men as they were leaving. According to a report from Newsweek, published online in The Daily Beast, one killed Samouni member was found on the street on January 4. His hands were cuffed, but the circumstances of his death are not clear as there were no eyewitness accounts reported as of January 19, 2009.

A representative from the Israeli thinktank and advocacy organisation, the Jerusalem Center for Public Affairs, Lt. Colonel (res.) Jonathan Halevi, said that an examination of freely accessible Palestinian sources show that five members of the Samouni family were affiliated with Palestinian Islamic Jihad group; Tawfiq al-Samouni, who was killed on January 5, was a Palestinian Islamic Jihad operative, according to Halevi. He suggests that the official Palestinian Islamic Jihad version of the occurrences on the days of the incident indicate that its fighters had been operating in the area against IDF. Based on the evidences, he suggests that it is plausible civilians were caught in the fighting.

According to Israeli soldiers who took part in operations in the Zeitoun district, and who spoke with Haaretz and Breaking the Silence, brigade commander Col. Ilan Malka insisted that not a single ambulance should enter the sector under his responsibility, fearing Hamas attempts to capture Israeli soldiers. A soldier said that Col. Malka insisted the wounded should be taken on foot for medical care, to meet ambulances at a distance of over three kilometers away. The ambulances were kept at a distance, according to the Red Cross, by an earth mound put in the road into the area by the Israeli military. But many reports from the field stated that some groups of civilians who did try to walk to the ambulances were turned back, with soldiers firing at them.

Israel said that it cooperated with medics during the war although battlefield conditions sometimes made permitting access impossible. It said it would address this incident after it concluded its investigations. The IDF said it did not target civilians and in challenging situations in which fighting occurred within residential areas, civilian casualties were unfortunately possible.

Local witnesses said that most of the family members who died had been killed instantly, while others sustained wounds and were unable to receive help in time, due to the IDF's alleged refusal to allow paramedics access to the wounded. One Palestinian doctor said that over 100 phone calls were made by residents seeking help for the injured. While two medics were sent, they were reportedly blocked by the Israelis. Israel said that it cooperated with medics but it was sometimes impossible to permit access because of the battlefield conditions. Among those wounded in the Monday attack was 12-year-old Ishaq Samouni, who bled for two days before he died on Wednesday. On Wednesday, Israelis ordered a three-hour pause in hostilities to allow entry of rescue workers and humanitarian aid. Paramedics found four exhausted children beside their mothers' corpses; the children were in the open for 48 hours with Israeli soldiers nearby. The head of Red Cross operations in the Gaza Strip said the first rescue team could only take out only the wounded, and had to leave the dead, because they only had four ambulances and they had limited time. Israel restricted the entry of the ambulances and medics had to walk and then carry the injured in a donkey cart back to the ambulances a mile away. On the following Thursday, the Red Cross stated that the Israelis did not fulfil its role in the care and vacating of the wounded as required by international law. The rest of the corpses were collected two weeks later, a day after the IDF disengaged.

The IDF denied that they were targeting civilians. The New York Times reported that Hamas members launched rockets at Israel about a mile away from the residents, and that Zeitoun "is known to have many supporters of Hamas." The IDF stated that their purpose was to besiege areas from where Hamas launched rockets, and that Zeitoun was one of these areas. Disputing this claim, Zeitoun residents claimed that Hamas did not have much support in their area and that the residents are mostly supporters of Fatah. In a statement from the IDF, an Israeli official said they are investigating the attacks but did not deny the attacks were intentional.

The United Nations high commissioner for human rights, Navanethem Pillay, along with other international aid officials advocated an investigation in Zeitoun for possible war crimes.

=== Racist graffiti ===
Two of the houses belonging to the Samouni clan were the only buildings that were not completely demolished. Slogans were found inside written in Hebrew and English, including "Death to Arabs"; "The Only Good Arab is a Dead Arab", and "Arabs are pieces of shit". One slogan "1 is down, 999,999 to go" evidently referred to Gaza's Palestinian population of around one million people. Another depicted a gravestone marked with the legend, "Arabs 1948–2009". An officer from a unit in the area stated, "Sometimes soldiers don't differentiate between Hamas and Arabs." The IDF spokesperson said that the graffiti is "against any code of behavior of the IDF or moral values" and if the graffiti could be substantiated "soldiers will be punished."

== The Helw and ad-Daya families ==
According to the testimonies from the family members collected by LA Times correspondent, Israeli soldiers stormed the home of the Helw family, shooting 55-year-old Fuad Helw in front of his family and then instructing the rest of the family, 13 members, to leave the home. The family was assured by soldiers that they would not be targeted; however, as they were walking, they came under Israeli gunfire. Three family members were injured and a one-year-old was killed.

According to an account from Gaza residents delivered to B'Tselem, an air strike collapsed the home of Ad-Daya family, killing thirteen family members.
