= Daraj Quarter =

Area of the Old City of Gaza in Palestine

Coordinates: 31.516471°N 34.465504°E

Daraj Quarter الدرج
- Neighborhood
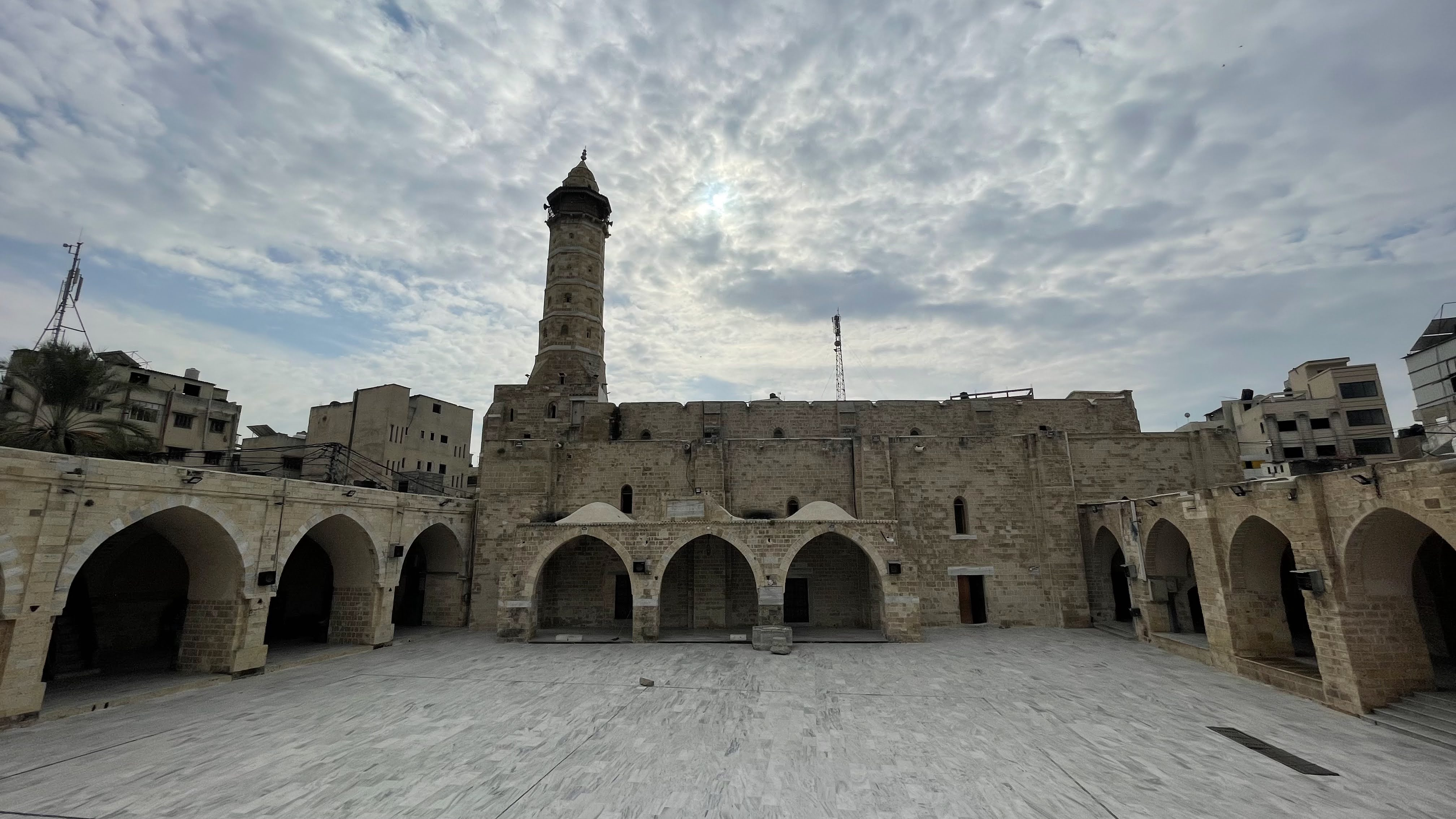
- The Great Mosque of Gaza in Daraj Quarter
- Interactive map of Daraj Quarter
- Country: Palestine
- Governorate: Gaza Governorate
- City: Gaza City

Government
  - Control: Hamas
- Time zone: UTC+2 (EET)
  - Summer (DST): +3

Al-Daraj or Haraat al-Daraj (Arabic: حارة الدرج) is the densely populated northwestern quarter of the Old City of Gaza. Its name translates as "Quarter of the Steps." Situated on an oblong hill about 20 meters (66 ft) above sea level and higher than any other area in the city, al-Daraj likely received its name either from stairs that once led to it or from the feeling of climbing steps when attempting to reach the neighborhood. It is also referred to as the "Muslim Quarter" and contains several mosques and other Muslim edifices.

Among them are the city's largest mosque, the Great Omari Mosque, as well as the al-Sayed Hashem Mosque, the Sheikh Zakariya Mosque, the Sheikh Faraj Mosque and Madrasa al-Zahrah. Al-Daraj is separated from the southern Zaytun Quarter by Omar Mukhtar Street.

== History ==
Daraj Quarter is the oldest populated area of Gaza city, being built over the site of ancient Gaza. The remnants of the city's ancient past are visible in many of the neighborhood's stone houses where marble columns and slabs have been reused as building materials. According to Ottoman tax records, al-Daraj was a relatively large neighborhood in 1525, with 141 households. Containing Qasr al-Basha, it was the seat of power for the provincial governors of Gaza and much of Palestine during Mamluk and Ottoman rule over the city by at least the 17th century. At the end of the 19th century, it was called Haret ed-Deredj.

=== Significance in Islamic History ===
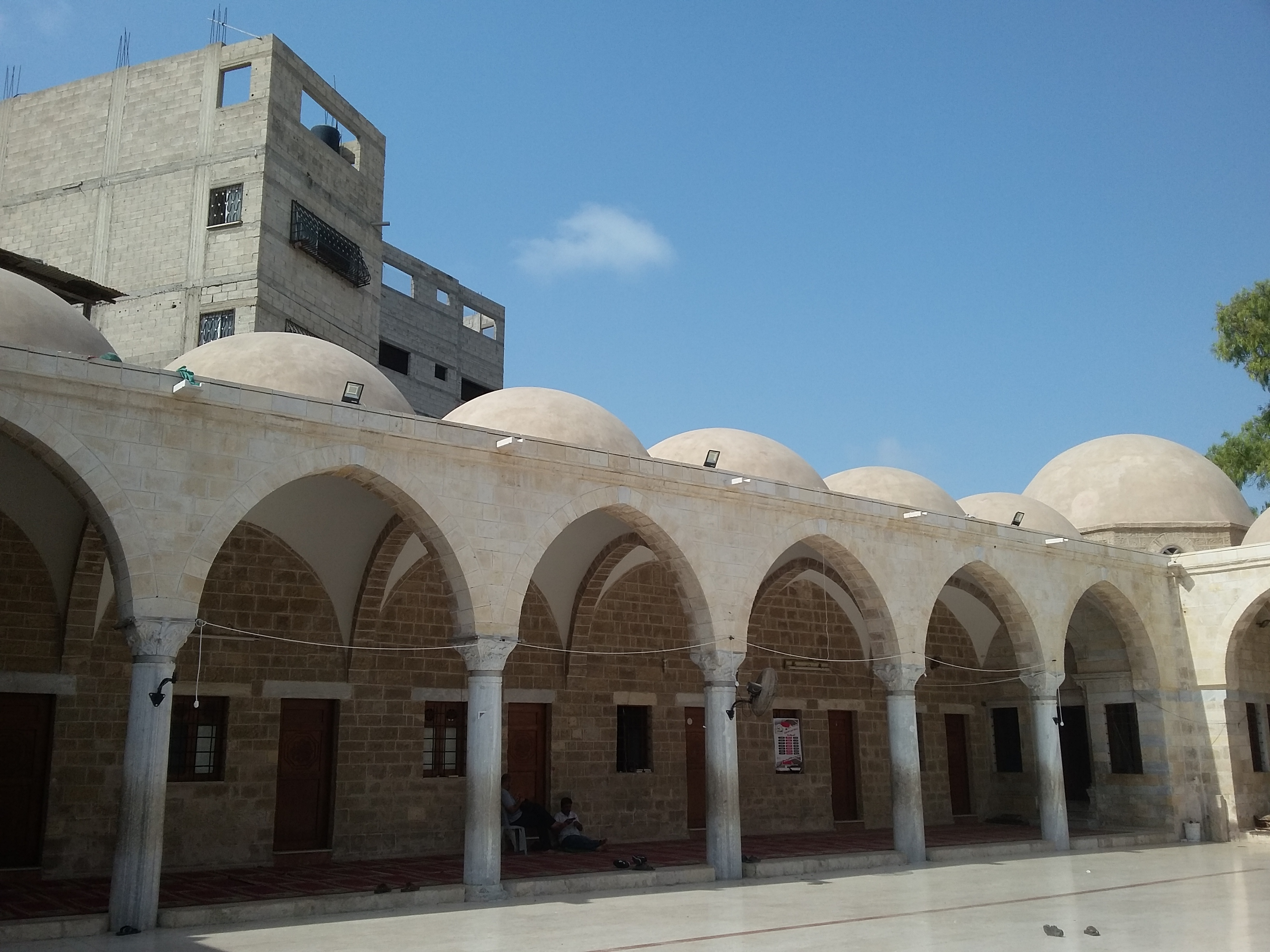
Sayed al-Hashim Mosque in 2017

Al-Daraj is the burial place of Hashim ibn Abd Manaf, the great-grandfather of Muhammad. Hashim, the third Major Chief Leader of the Quraysh tribe of Mecca, died in Gaza in 497 CE while traveling on a trade journey. The Sayed al-Hashim Mosque, built around the 12th century, marks his gravesite. It is named in honor of Hashim and his descendant, Muhammad.

The burial site in Al-Daraj is the source of one of Gaza's names, "غزة هاشم" (Ghazzat Hashim), literally translating to "Hashim's Gaza.".

The mosque faced partial destruction in 2023 by Israeli forces at the start of the Gaza war.

== See also ==
- Palestine
- Gaza
- Islam
- Al-Daraji
- Israeli–Palestinian conflict
  - Al-Tabin school attack
- Great Mosque of Gaza
- Daraj Tuffah
- Daraj Media

== Bibliography ==
- Cohen, Amnon; Lewis, Bernard (1978). Population and Revenue in the Towns of Palestine in the Sixteenth Century. Princeton University Press. ISBN 0-691-09375-X.
- Guérin, Victor (1884). La Terre sainte (in French). Vol. 2. Paris.
- Meyer, Martin Abraham (1907). History of the city of Gaza: from the earliest times to the present day. Columbia University Press.
- Sharon, Moshe (2009). Corpus Inscriptionum Arabicarum Palaestinae, G. Vol. 4. BRILL. ISBN 978-90-04-17085-8.
- Roy, Sara (2011). Between Extremism & Civism: Political Islam In Palestine. Princeton University Press. ISBN 978-0-691-12448-3.
