= Church of Saint Porphyrius airstrike =

2023 bombing of a church in Gaza City, Palestine

Coordinates: 31.5033°N 34.4621°E

- Part of the Gaza war
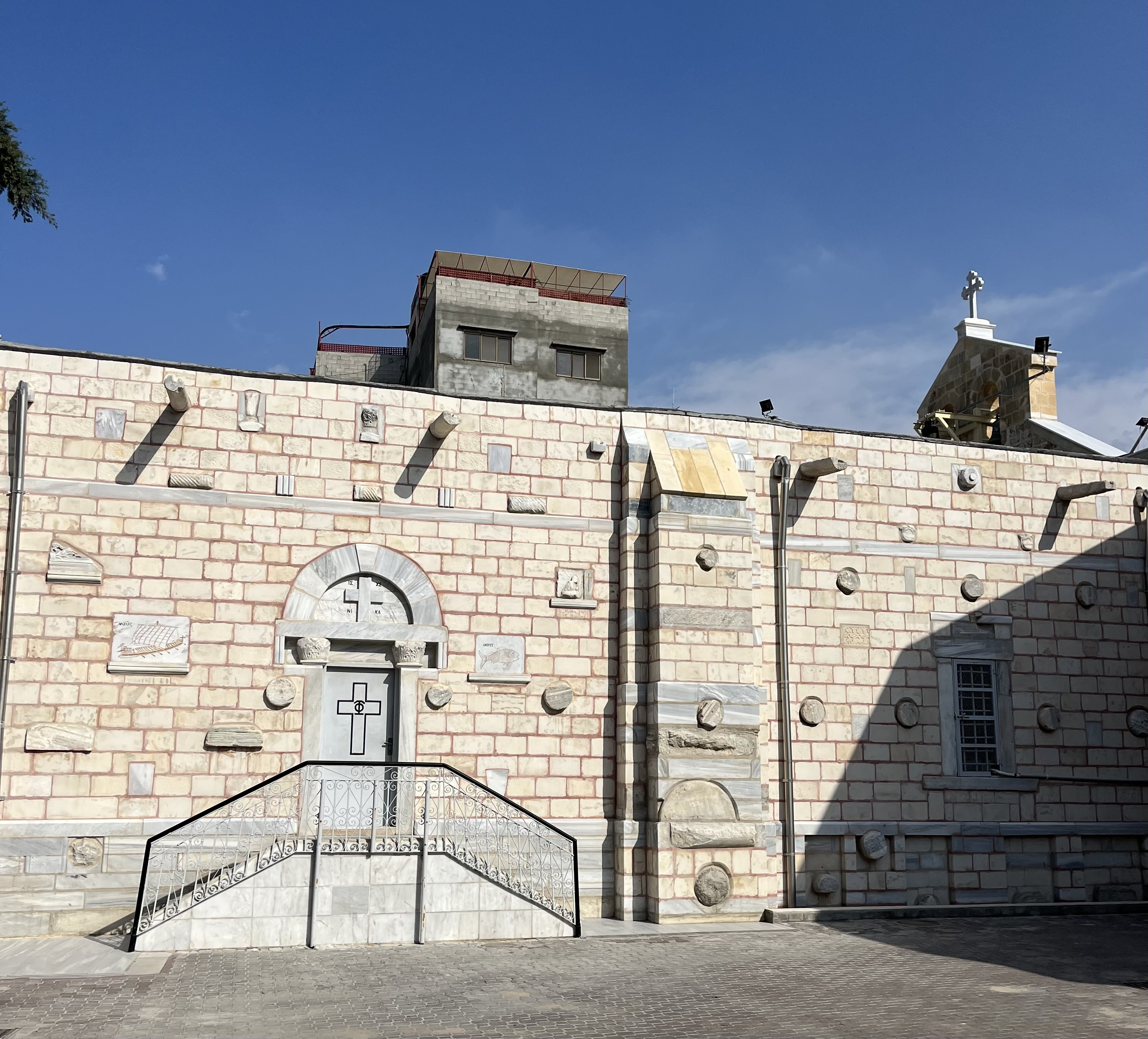
- Saint Porphyrius Church in 2022, before the Israeli airstrike

- Location within the Gaza Strip
- Location: Gaza City, Gaza Strip
- Date: 19 October 2023
- Target: Building adjacent to the Church of Saint Porphyrius
- Attack type: Airstrike
- Deaths: 18 Palestinian civilians
- Injuries: 12 / "at least 20"
- Perpetrator: Israeli Air Force

On 19 October 2023, during the Gaza war, a building in the compound of the Church of Saint Porphyrius, a Greek Orthodox church in Gaza City, was destroyed during an Israeli airstrike, killing 18 Palestinian civilians and injuring between 12 and "at least 20". Some 450 Palestinian residents of the Gaza Strip, mainly Christians, had been sheltering in the compound. The church building itself sustained slight damage.

== Background ==
The Greek Orthodox Church of Saint Porphyrius is located in the Zaytun Quarter of Gaza's Old City, and houses the tomb of Saint Porphyrius who was a bishop in Gaza from 395 AD to 420 AD. The church was also damaged during the Israel Defense Forces (IDF) bombing campaign in the Gaza Strip in July 2014, in which its water tanks were destroyed and a neighboring home was damaged by IDF tank shells. During the shelling in 2014, the church had been offering refuge to Gazan citizens and had held Ramadan prayers in the courtyard. According to CBN News claimed, the same year, that Greek Orthodox Archbishop Alexios had said off-camera that Hamas had used the church grounds to fire rockets.

Saint Porphyrius is less than 300 metres (980 ft) from the al-Ahli Arab hospital compound, where in 2023 an explosion killed and injured hundreds of people who had fled there to escape Israeli airstrikes.

A building from the church compound was hit again in 2024 by a missile, which however failed to explode, averting loss of life among the refugees sheltering there.

== Airstrike ==
Palestinian officials stated that at least 500 Muslims and Christians had been sheltering in the church from IDF bombardments. A member of the community indicated that about 100 people had been sheltering in the two-storey building hit by the strike, with about 400 spread across the entire complex. In an initial statement, the IDF stated that Israeli fighter jets had hit a nearby command and control centre that was being used by Hamas to attack Israel. The IDF acknowledged damage to the church and reports of casualties resulting from the strike.

The airstrike caused damage to the church's exterior and led to the collapse of an adjacent building belonging to the church complex.

The neighboring Katib al-Wilaya Mosque also sustained damage as a result of the airstrike.

Video footage from the church after the airstrike was published and appeared to show a young wounded boy being carried from the rubble. Another video published showed people searching through the rubble of the building.

== Casualties ==
At least 18 Palestinian civilians were killed in the airstrike. A civil defense worker reported that those on the lower floors had been killed, while most of the survivors had been on the upper floors. Several injured Palestinians were transported to the hospital. Among those killed was photographer and archivist Marwan Tarazi, custodian of Kegham Djeghalian's 20th-century photography studio archive.

== Reactions ==
The Greek Orthodox Patriarchate of Jerusalem strongly denounced the attack as a war crime and accused the Israeli military of targeting churches and civilian shelters. Amnesty International called on the attack to be investigated as a possible war crime.

Former U.S. Congressman Justin Amash announced that several of his relatives were killed in the airstrike.

Pope Francis mentioned the strike in a call for an end to the fighting, humanitarian aid to be allowed into Gaza, and the release of the hostages held by Hamas.

== See also ==
- Attacks on religious sites during the Israeli invasion of Gaza
- Israeli razing of cemeteries and necroviolence against Palestinians
- List of military engagements during the Gaza war
- Outline of the Gaza war
- Timeline of the Israeli–Palestinian conflict in 2023
- Al-Qarara Cultural Museum
- Destruction of cultural heritage during the Gaza war
