= Omar Mukhtar Street =

Street in Gaza City, Gaza Strip, Palestine

Omar Mukhtar Street شارع عمر المختار
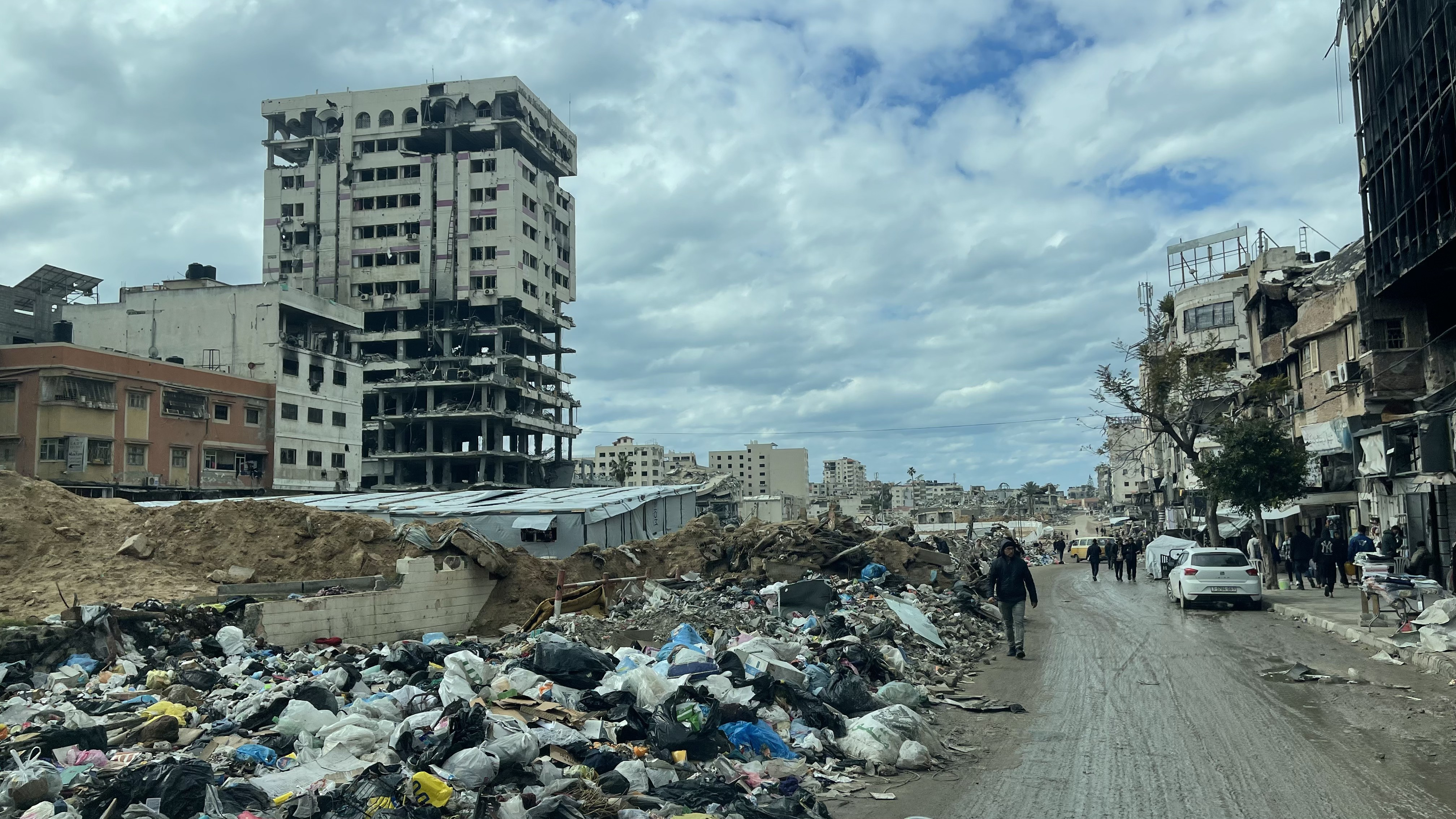
- The road in 2025

Location
- Location: Gaza City, Gaza Strip, Palestine

Omar Mukhtar Street (Arabic: شارع عمر المختار) is the main street of Gaza City, in the State of Palestine, running from Palestine Square to the Port of Gaza in the Rimal district, separating the Old City's al-Daraj and Zaytun Quarter. Gaza's hotel strip is a part of Omar Mukhtar Street, and most of Gaza's most important buildings are located along the street.

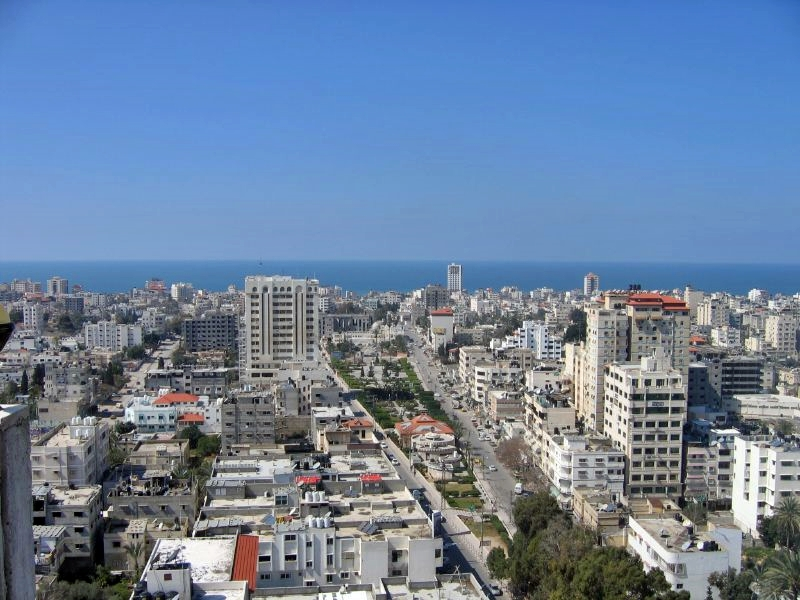
A view west along the street in 2006

Built during World War I by Ottoman governor Jamal Pasha, the street was originally named after him. However, following the ouster of Ottoman forces from Palestine in 1917, Gaza's city council, headed by Fahmi al-Husseini, named the street after Omar Mukhtar, a Libyan revolutionary leader. Part of the medieval khan az-zayt was demolished to make room for the street.

The British Mandatory Palestine turned Omar Mukhtar Street into a main street in 1937, using the zoning plan of the urban planner, Henry Kendall.

== Important buildings ==
- Great Mosque of Gaza
- Welayat Mosque
- Public Library of Gaza (destroyed by Israel on November 27, 2024)
- Palestinian Centre for Human Rights
- Gaza Municipal Hall
- Saint Porphryrius Church
- Gold Market (Souk ad-Dahab)
- Rashad Shawwa Cultural Centre
