= Abu Khadra Mosque =

Destroyed mosque in Gaza City, Palestine

- مسجد أبوخضرة
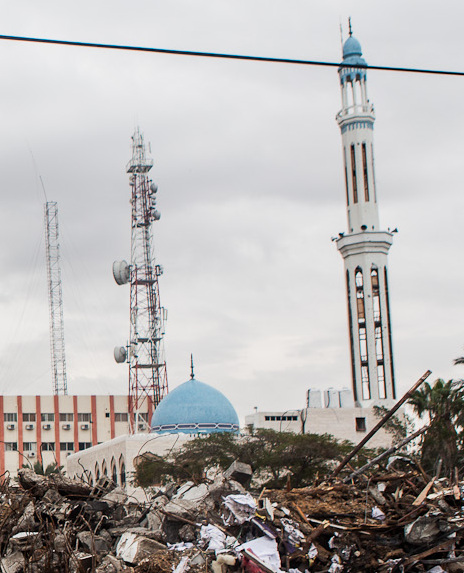
- The mosque in 2012, following its destruction

- Location of the former mosque in Gaza

Religion
- Affiliation: Sunni Islam (former)
- Ecclesiastical or organisational status: Mosque (–2012)
- Status: Destroyed

Location
- Location: Sabra, Gaza
- Country: Palestine
- Interactive map of Abu Khadra Mosque
- Coordinates: 31°30′46″N 34°27′10″E

Architecture
- Destroyed: 2012

Specifications
- Dome: 2
- Minaret: 1

The Abu Khadra Mosque (Arabic: مسجد أبوخضرة) was a mosque located in the Sabra neighborhood of Gaza City, in the State of Palestine. Prior to its destruction by Israeli forces in 2012, the mosque had one minaret and two domes.

The former mosque was located 1,660 kilometres (1,030 mi) from Mecca.

== See also ==
- List of mosques in Palestine
- Islam in Palestine
