= Zaytun Quarter =

Neighborhood in Gaza, Palestine

Zeitoun الزيتون
- Neighborhood
- Zaitoun
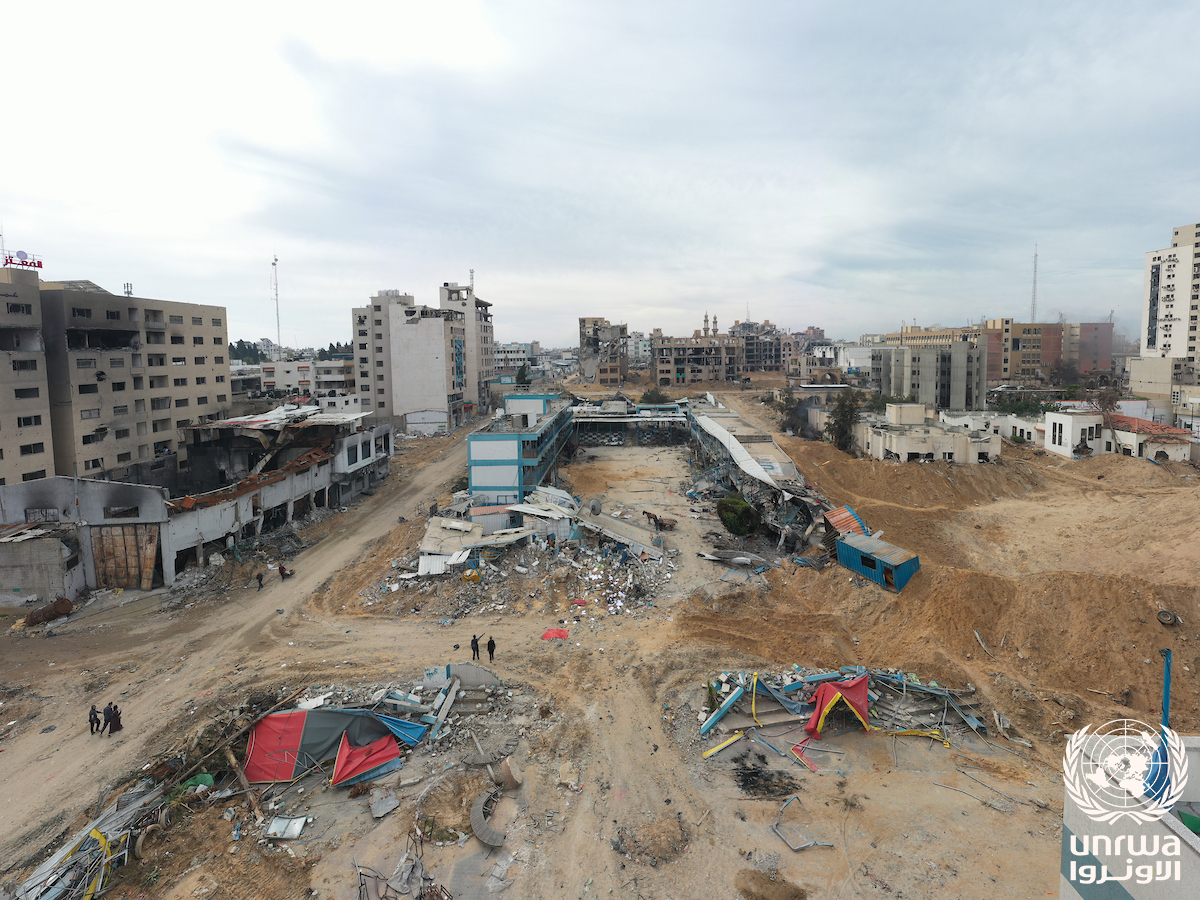
- Ruins in Zaytun in 2024
- Interactive map of Zeitoun
- Location in the Gaza Strip
- Coordinates: 31°29′15″N 34°26′38″E
- State: State of Palestine
- Governorate: Gaza Governorate
- City: Gaza

Government
  - Control: Contested: Israel; Hamas
- Time zone: UTC+2 (EET)
  - Summer (DST): +3

Al-Zaytun (also spelled Zeitoun or Harat az-Zaytoun; Arabic: الزيتون; Arabic translation: "the Quarter of Olive trees") is the southwestern and largest quarter of the Old City of Gaza. Prior to the demolition of the Old City's walls, it was one of the three walled quarters of Gaza's Old City, the other two being al-Tuffah in the northeast and al-Daraj in the northwest. Omar Mukhtar Street, Gaza City's main thoroughfare, separates al-Zaytun from al-Daraj.

== History ==
The northwestern part of al-Zaytun was known as "Dar al-Khudar" ("the Vegetable House"), which was a small subdivision that contained the open-air vegetable market known as "Suq al-Khudar". In 1525, Dar al-Khudar contained 43 households, while Zaytun, the south eastern part of present Al-Zaytun, had 54 households and 30 bachelors, and Nasara, close to the Church of Saint Porphyrius, had 82 households.

The Christian and Jewish neighborhoods of Gaza were also a part of al-Zaytun. The 5th century Saint Porphryrius Church, belonging to the Greek Orthodox denomination, is located in al-Zaytun and stands alongside the 14th century Kateb al-Welaya Mosque, with only two meters of space in between the former's bell tower and the latter's minaret. Adjacent to the church is the old Christian graveyard. Also located in al-Zaytun is the al-Shamah Mosque.

The last Jewish residents of al-Zaytun were evacuated by the British army following the 1929 Palestine riots.

It was expanded in the 1930s and 1940s as Gaza developed outside its center. Much of the funding for the initial construction is attributed to foreign institutions, such as missionary hospitals. After the 1948 Arab-Israeli War, with the influx of Palestinian refugees, Zeitoun's population swelled. Ahmed Yassin's family settled the district in the 1950s.

=== 2008–2009 Gaza War ===
During the 2008–2009 Israel–Gaza conflict, the Israel Defense Forces (IDF) launched a ground incursion in the area, occupying the district. During this period, 48 Palestinians, mostly from three families, were killed. In addition, 27 homes, a number of farms, and a mosque were destroyed.

=== Gaza war (2023–) ===
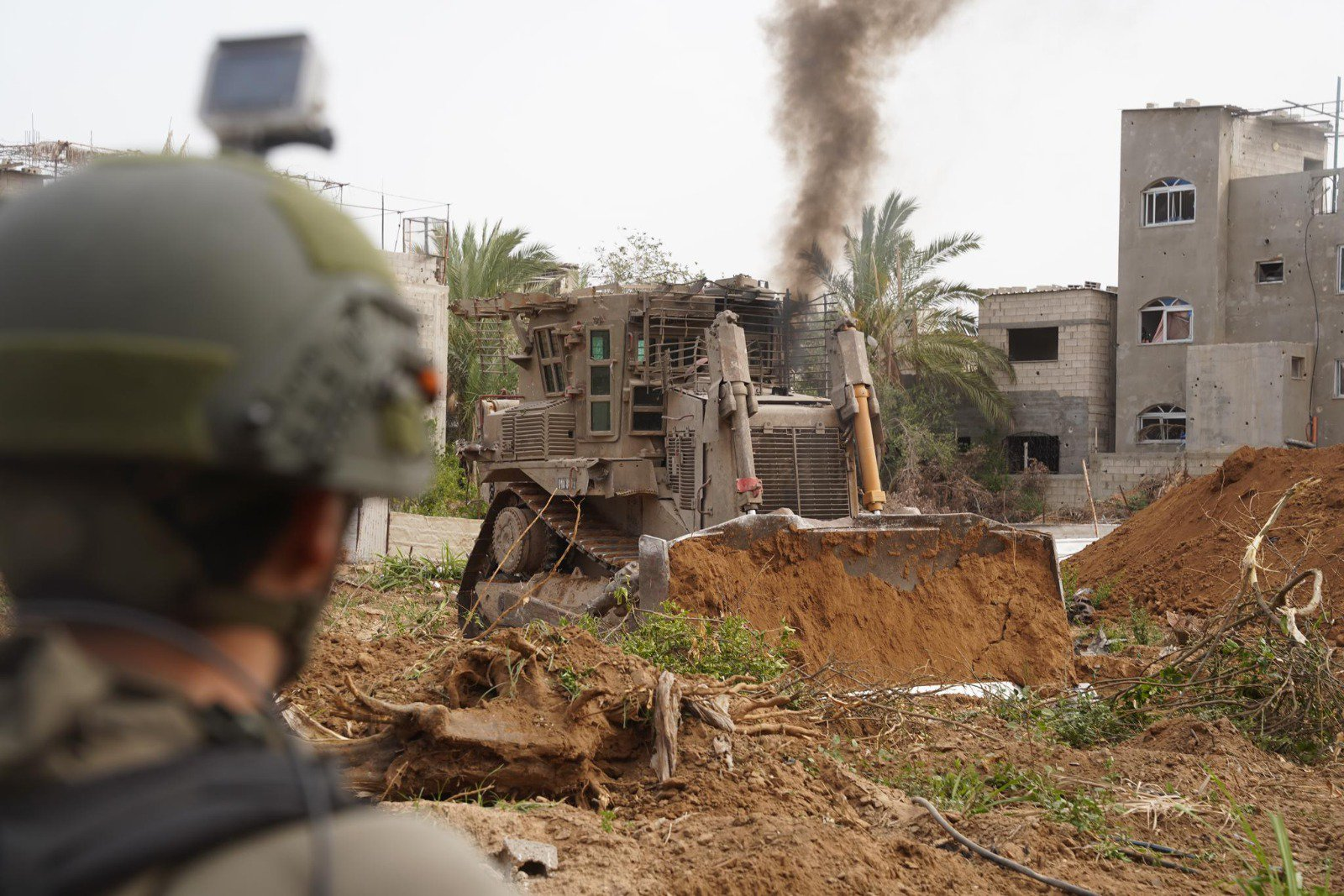
An IDF Caterpillar D9 in Zaytun in May 2024

The Zeitoun neighborhood of Gaza City became a focal point of attack by the IDF during the Gaza war. On October 19, 2023, the Israeli Air Force struck the neighborhood's historic Church of Saint Porphyrius, killing 19 civilians. In 2024, the 749 Battalion was deployed to southern Gaza City, including Zeitoun, as part of a broader campaign involving demolition and population displacement. Reports indicated that the area experienced widespread destruction as part of the IDF’s ongoing efforts in the region.

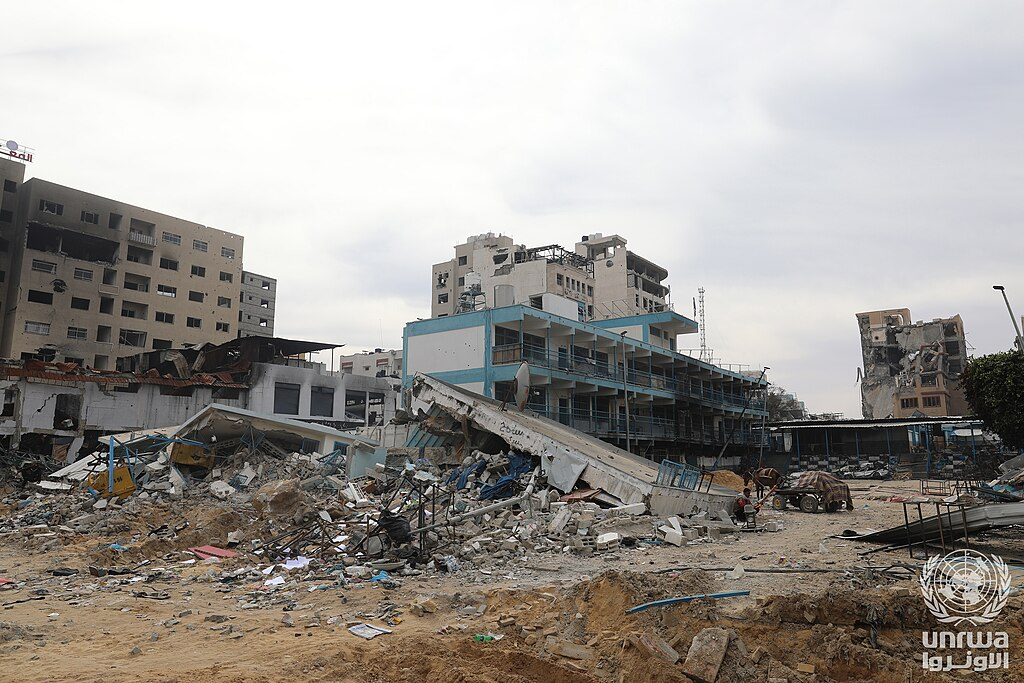
The wreckage of the UNRWA Al-Zaytoon Prep Male School in February 2024

A video shared by a member of the IDF’s D9 bulldozer company documented the demolition of several homes in Zeitoun. The video, later reposted on the company’s official social media account, included the caption, “Our job is to flatten Gaza.” Additional commentary on the post affirmed the company’s determination, stating, “No one will stop us.” The footage, along with other footage from the Zeitoun neighborhood, drew criticism from international observers including Amnesty for their impact on civilian infrastructure and population centers.

The neighborhood's partially destroyed Church of Saint Porphyrius was threatened by a renewed Israeli incursion in May 2024. In September 2024, amid the Israeli military's seventh incursion in the neighborhood, Israeli warplanes struck a school-turned-shelter in the neighborhood, killing more than a dozen people.

== Bibliography ==
- Cohen, Amnon; Lewis, Bernard (1978). Population and Revenue in the Towns of Palestine in the Sixteenth Century. Princeton University Press. ISBN 0-691-09375-X.
- Meyer, Martin Abraham (1907). History of the city of Gaza: from the earliest times to the present day. Columbia University Press.
- Palmer, E. H. (1881). The Survey of Western Palestine: Arabic and English Name Lists Collected During the Survey by Lieutenants Conder and Kitchener, R. E. Transliterated and Explained by E.H. Palmer. Committee of the Palestine Exploration Fund.
- Sharon, Moshe (2009). Corpus Inscriptionum Arabicarum Palaestinae, G. Vol. 4. BRILL. ISBN 978-90-04-17085-8.
- Dumper, Michael; Stanley, Bruce E.; Abu-Lughod, J. (2007), Cities of the Middle East and North Africa: A Historical Encyclopedia, ABC-CLIO, ISBN 978-1-57607-919-5
- Milton-Edwards, Beverley (1999), Islamic Politics in Palestine, I.B.Tauris, ISBN 978-1-86064-475-7
