= Katib al-Wilaya Mosque =

Mosque in Gaza City, Palestine

- جامع الولايات
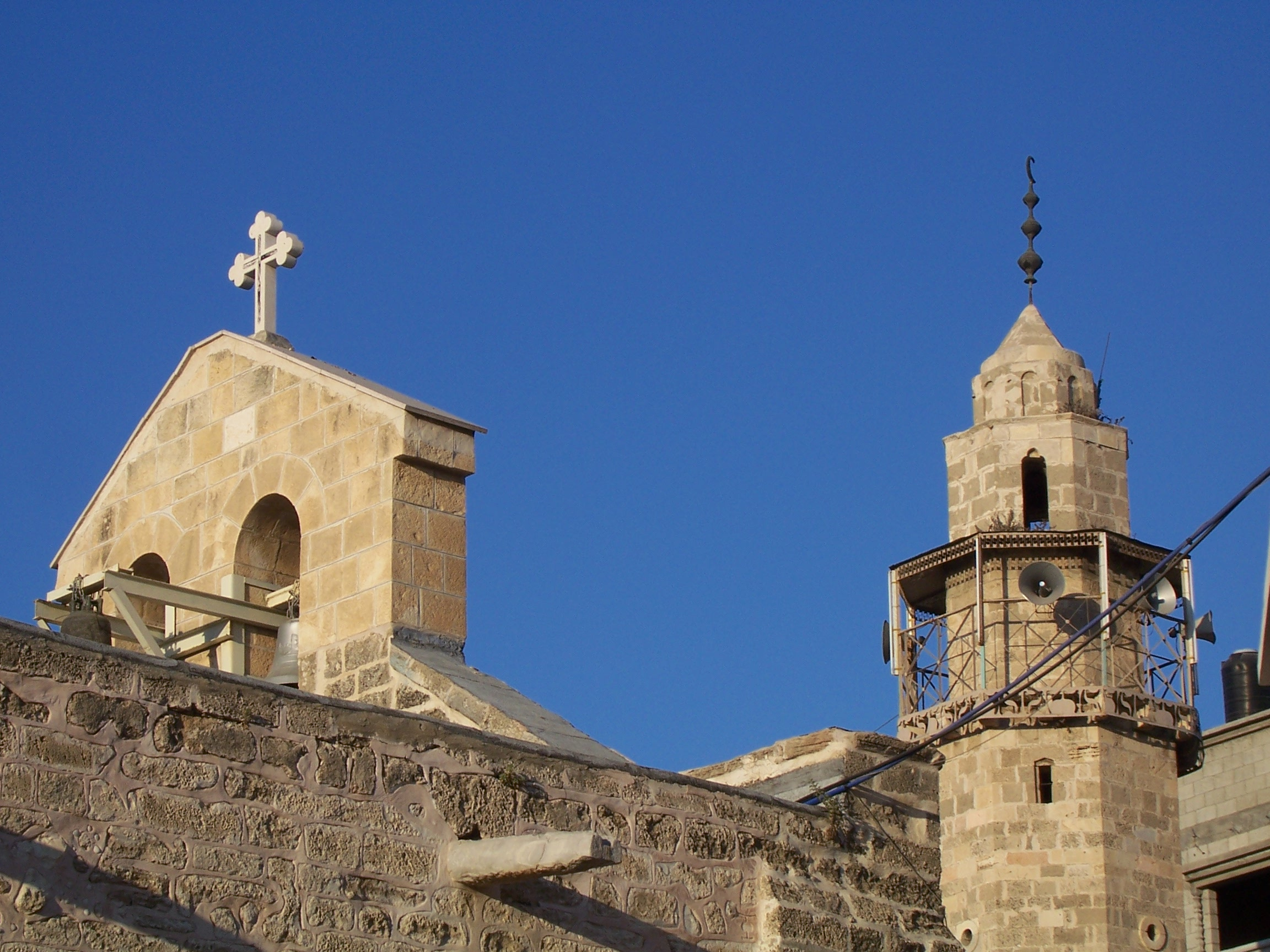
- The minaret (right) seen behind the Church of Saint Porphyrius

- Location of the mosque Gaza

Religion
- Affiliation: Islam
- Ecclesiastical or organisational status: Mosque
- Status: Possibly closed

Location
- Location: Zaytun Quarter, Gaza City, Gaza Strip
- Country: Palestine
- Interactive map of Katib al-Wilaya Mosque
- Coordinates: 31°30′14″N 34°27′44″E

Architecture
- Style: Mamluk and Ottoman architecture
- Completed: 1432 CE
- Minaret: 1

The Katib al-Wilaya Mosque (Arabic: جامع الولايات, romanized: Masjid Kātib al Wilāyah, lit. 'Clerk of the State Mosque'), also known as the Welayat Mosque, is a small mosque located along Omar Mukhtar Street in the Zaytun Quarter of the Old City of Gaza, Palestine.

The minaret was built by the Burji Mamluks in 1432 CE (835 AH). Additions to the western part of the mosque were commissioned in 1587 by Ahmad Bik during Ottoman rule of the region.

== History ==
An inscription on the base of the minaret dates the construction of the tower to 1432 CE (835 AH), and the prayer hall may have been built around the same time. The work was commissioned by Sayf al-Din Inal. A separate inscription records significant rebuilding work in 1587 (995 AH) on the instructions of Ahmad Bik. Bik was a scribe (katib) of the state (wilayah), and the mosque's name is derived from Bik's official role.

In January 2024, Al Jazeera reported that the mosque was damaged as part of the airstrike on the adjacent Church of Saint Porphyrius by the Israeli military during its bombing of the Gaza Strip. However, a January 2025 report compiled by the Centre for Cultural Heritage Preservation detail the impact of the war on Palestinian heritage sites described the mosque as "not damaged"; no further detail was given.

== Architecture ==
The main body of the mosque is its prayer hall, which is rectangular in shape and dates from the Mamluk period. The entrance is located at the qibla (indicator of direction towards Mecca) wall, and the mosque has architectural similarities to the Ibn Marwan Mosque which was also built in the 14th century.

=== Minaret ===
The mosque's minaret, rising above the eastern wall, is situated adjacent to the bell tower of the St. Porphyrius Church. Aref al-Aref, a Palestinian historian, stated that local legend attributed this positioning of the building to the orders of Rashidun caliph Umar ibn al-Khattab, to the Muslim general Amr ibn al-'As, to build a mosque next to every church in the lands conquered by the Muslims. Another anecdote claimed that the mosque had been a monastery, known as Deir Salm al-Fada'il. These accounts have no verifiable basis, other than local folklore. In a study of Mamluk architecture in Gaza, archaeologist Moain Sadeq wrote that both of the suggested origins put forward by al-Aref are unlikely.

In 1432, the minaret was restored by Sayf ad-Din Inal, the Burji mamluk who later became sultan in 1453.

== See also ==
- List of mosques in Palestine
- Islam in Palestine
