= Church of Saint Porphyrius =

Church in Gaza City, Palestine

- كنيسة القديس برفيريوس
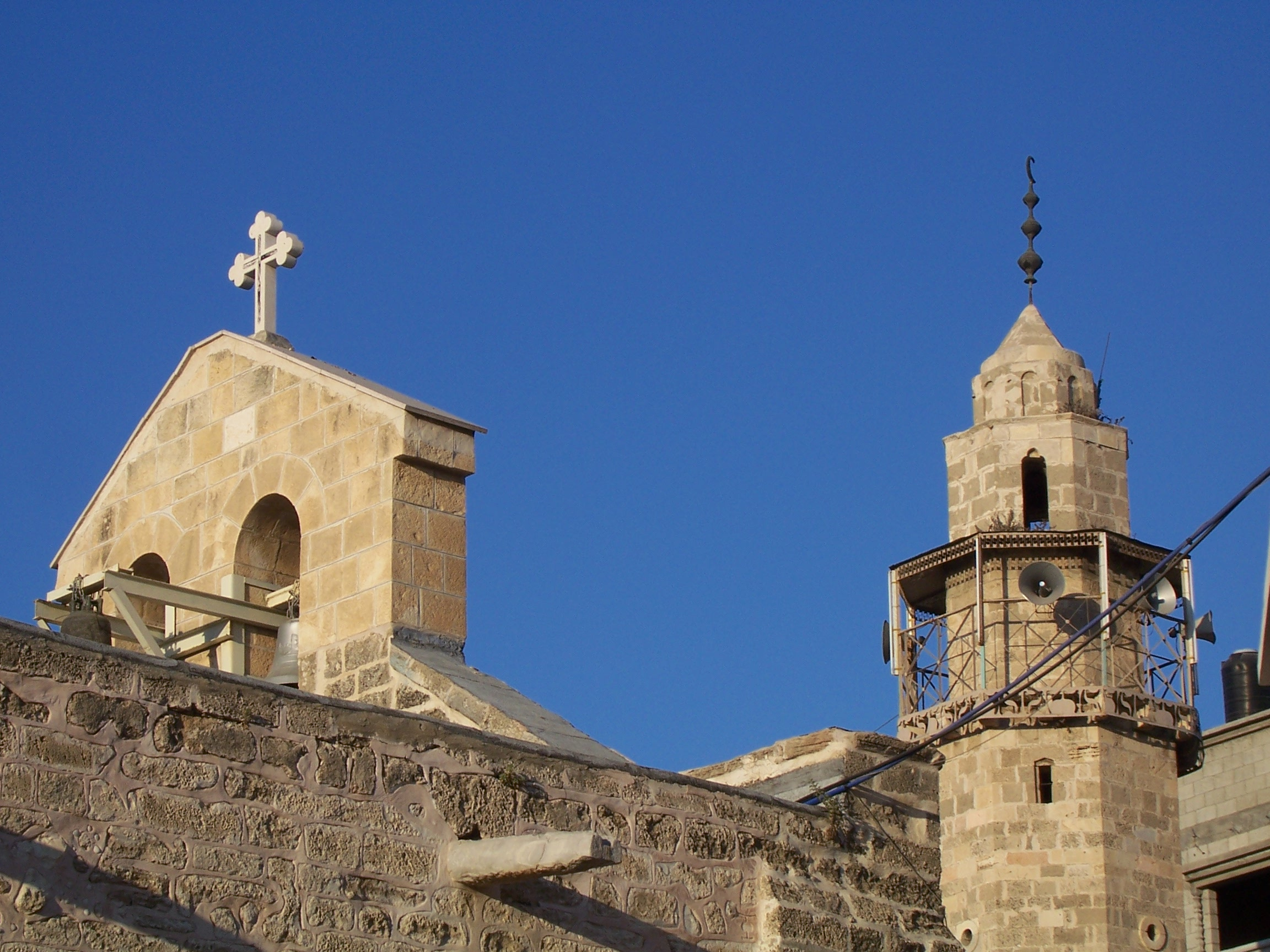
- Saint Porphyrius Church and minaret
- Church of Saint Porphyrius
- 31.5033°N 34.4621°E
- Location: Gaza City
- Country: State of Palestine
- Denomination: Greek Orthodox Patriarchate of Jerusalem

History
- Dedication: Saint Porphyrius

Architecture
- Completed: 1150s/1160s

Specifications
- Length: 22.9 meters (75 ft) (inside)
- Width: 8.9 meters (29 ft) (inside)

Administration
- Archdiocese: Archdiocese of Tiberias

Clergy
- Archbishop: Alexios Moschonas

The Church of Saint Porphyrius (Greek: Εκκλησία του Αγίου Πορφυρίου, romanized: Ekklisía tou Agíou Porfyríou, IPA: [e.kliˈsi.a tu aˈʝi.u por.fiˈri.u]; Arabic: كَنِيسَة الْقِدِّيس بُرْفِيرْيُوس, romanized: Kanīsat al-Qiddīs Burfīryūs) is a Greek Orthodox church in Gaza City, Palestine. It belongs to the Greek Orthodox Patriarchate of Jerusalem and is the oldest active church in the city. Located in the Zaytun Quarter of the Old City of Gaza, it is named after the 5th-century bishop of Gaza, Saint Porphyrius, whose tomb is situated in the northeastern corner of the church.

On 19 October 2023, during the Gaza war, a building from the church compound was damaged during an Israeli airstrike, killing 18 Palestinian civilians, but the church building itself was not damaged.

== History ==
=== Saint Porphyrius of Gaza ===
The Patriarch of Jerusalem appointed Saint Porphyrius (c. 347–420), when he was aged 45, as custodian of the Venerable Wood of the Cross of the Lord. He was described by the Roman Christian hagiographer Mark the Deacon, Porphyrius' companion from 395 until 420, as the Christianizer of the "disobedient pagan people of Gaza." According to the legend, there was a terrible drought in Gaza that ended only after Saint Porphyrius and a group of 280 Christians prayed to God with "fasting, vigil and procession". This led to the conversion of 25 pagans, as rain in this region was considered God's greatest gift.

=== The Byzantine- and Crusader-period churches ===
A church was built on the site as early as AD 425, and was converted into a mosque during the 7th century.

The current church was built by the Crusaders in the 1150s or 1160s; they likewise probably dedicated it to St Porphyrius. Records from the 15th century, however, show that the church was also dedicated to the Virgin Mary.

The church was renovated in 1856.

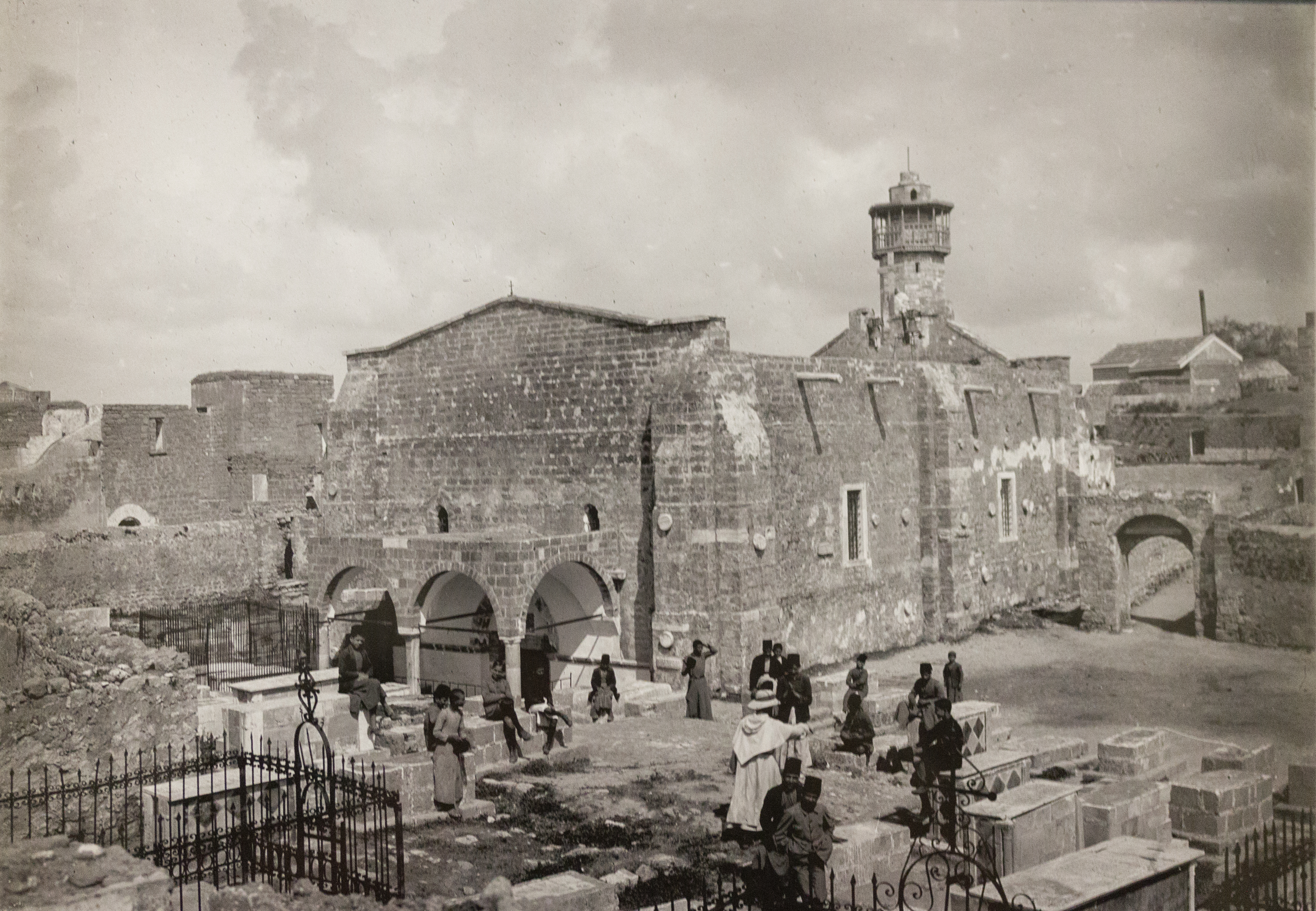
The church and cemetery in 1922, view from SW

=== Gaza wars ===
In the 2014 Gaza War, around 2,000 Palestinians slept in the church compound during Israeli bombings.

The church premises were again used as refuge for hundreds of civilians during the Gaza war, which started on October 7, 2023. On 19 October 2023, it was the site of an airstrike by the Israeli Air Force, which hit two halls sheltering Gazan Palestinian Muslims and Christians, causing the collapse of at least one building, and killed 18 civilians. Over 450 Palestinians had been sheltering there. A church annex was targeted again in July 2024.

== Description ==
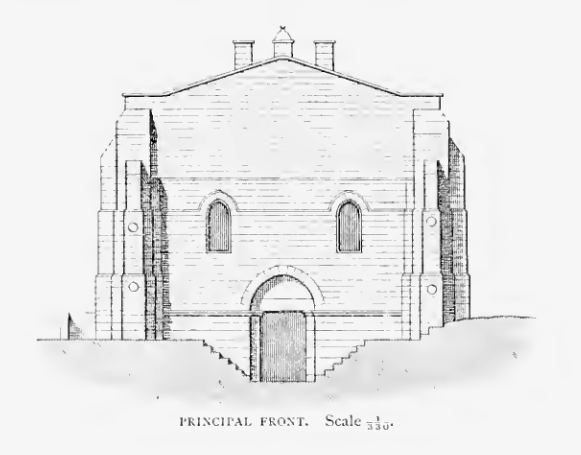
Elevation from west, Clermont-Ganneau (1873/74). There is no portico depicted.

The church pavement is far below ground level (1.8 meters (5.9 ft) in its southern part, and 3 meters (9.8 ft) on the northern side), suggesting that the present building was built atop of an earlier church structure. There are some cornices and bases that date back to the Crusader period, but much of the other portions are later additions.

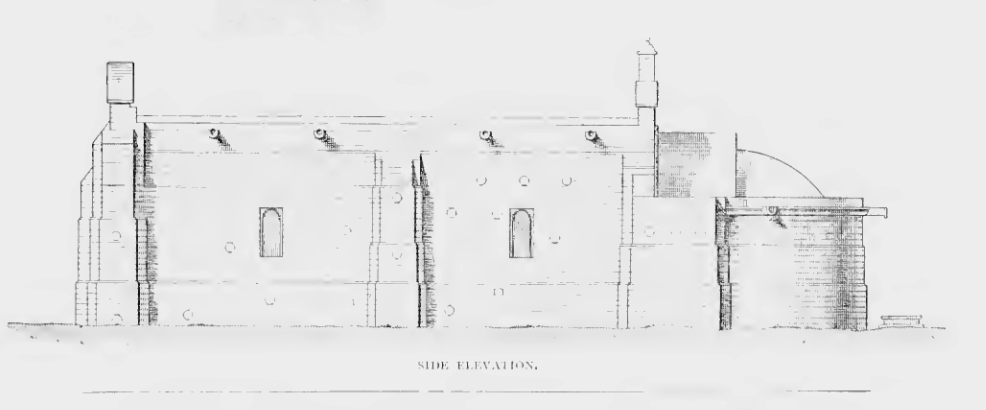
Elevation from south, Clermont-Ganneau (1873/74)

The church is rectangular in shape, with a half-dome roof over the altar apse. It consists of a single aisle made up of two groin-vaulted bays, with a projecting semi-circular apse preceded by a barrel-vaulted presbytery. Internally, the building measures 22.9 meters (75 ft) by 8.9 meters (29 ft), including the apse. It has architectural and constructional similarities with the Crusader-period former Cathedral of Saint John the Baptist (currently the Great Mosque of Gaza).

The church has three entrances. The main entrance is at the western façade and has a portico with three marble columns supporting two pointed arches. The column bases date to the Crusader period. A second entrance passes through the former medieval window on the southern side of the west bay, enlarged to become a door opening onto a women's gallery added in the modern period, equipped with stairs for going down to the level of the pavement. The third entrance, which offers access from the north side toward the eastern bay, seems to also be of recent date in its current form, probably dating to the 1856 restoration, but retains several medieval elements.

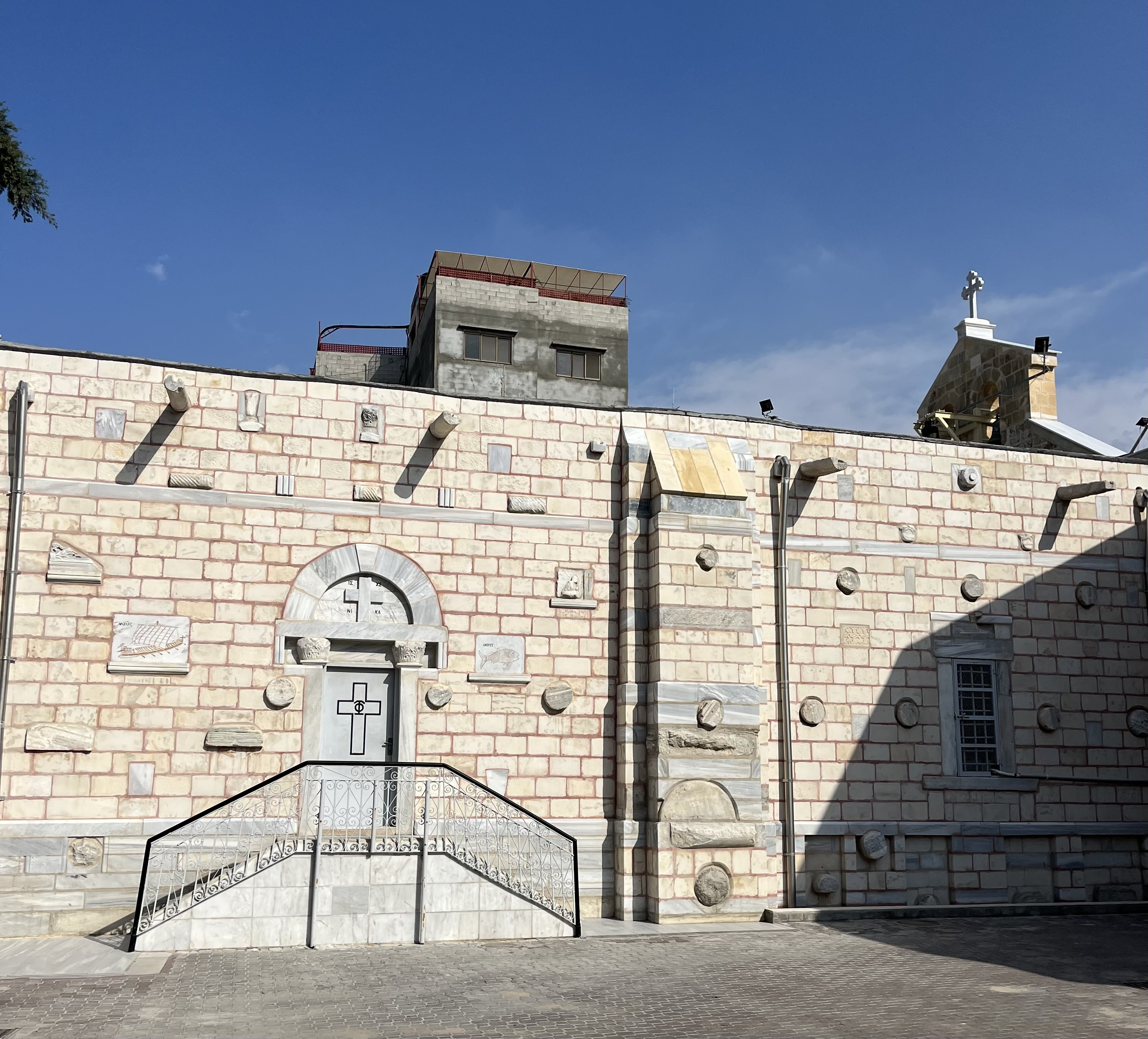
Southern wall with modern entrance to women's gallery (2022)

The thick-walled structure is supported by horizontal marble and granite columns and pilasters.

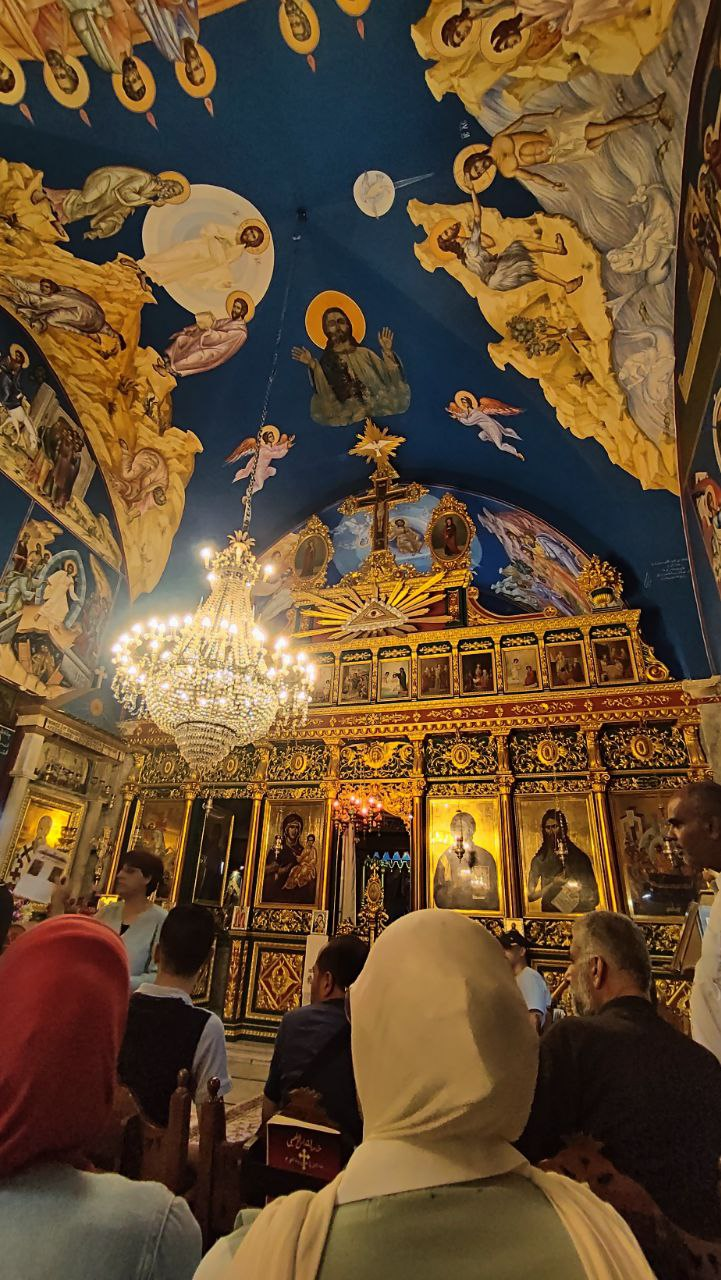
Kuwaitis visiting the church during wartime (2 December 2024)

== See also ==
- Destruction of cultural heritage during the Gaza war
- Gaza Baptist Church, Protestant church of Gaza City
- Holy Family Church, Gaza, Latin Catholic church of Gaza City
- List of archaeological sites in the Gaza Strip
- List of oldest church buildings

== Bibliography ==
- Clermont-Ganneau, C. S. (1896). [ARP] Archaeological Researches in Palestine 1873–1874, translated from the French by J. McFarlane. Vol. 2. London: Palestine Exploration Fund. (pp. 381–383
- Cohen, Amnon; Lewis, Bernard (1978). Population and Revenue in the Towns of Palestine in the Sixteenth Century. Princeton University Press. ISBN 0-691-09375-X.
- Dumper, Michael (2007). "Gaza". In Dumper, Michael R.T.; Stanley, Bruce E. (eds.). Cities of the Middle East and North Africa: A Historical Encyclopedia. ABC-CLIO. p. 156. ISBN 978-1-57607-919-5.
- Meyer, Martin Abraham (1907). History of the city of Gaza: from the earliest times to the present day. Columbia University Press.
- Pringle, Denys (1993). "No. 93 Church (of Saint Porphyrius)". The Churches of the Crusader Kingdom of Jerusalem: A-K (excluding Acre and Jerusalem). Vol. I. Cambridge University Press. pp. 216–219. ISBN 0-521-39036-2.
