= Al-Omari Mosque =

Al-Omari Mosque may refer to one of several mosques built in honour of the Caliph Umar ibn al-Khattab, including the following:

- Al-Omari Grand Mosque, in Beirut, Lebanon
- Mosque of Omar (Bethlehem), West Bank, Palestine
- Al-Omari Mosque (Bosra), in Bosra, Syria
- Al-Omari Mosque (Daraa), in Daraa, Syria
- Al Farooq Omar Bin Al Khattab Mosque, Dubai, UAE
- Great Omari Mosque, Gaza, Palestine
- Al-Omari Mosque, Dura, in Dura, Hebron, Palestine
- Omar ibn al-Khattab Mosque, Dumat al-Jandal, Saudi Arabia
- Mesquita Omar Ibn Al-Khatab, Foz do Iguaçu, Brazil
- Great Mosque of Gaza, also known as the Great Omari Mosque, Gaza, Palestine
- Mosque of Omar (Jerusalem), Jerusalem
- Sidna Omar Mosque, Jerusalem
- Umar Mosque (Leicester), Leicester, United Kingdom
- Great Omari Mosque of Lod, in Lod, Israel
- Mosque of Omar Ibn Al-Khattab, Maicao, Colombia

== See also ==
- Mosque of Omar
