= Takiat Ibrahim =

Charity and soup kitchen in Hebron, Palestine

Al-Takiya Al-Ibrahimiya
- التكية الإبراهيمية
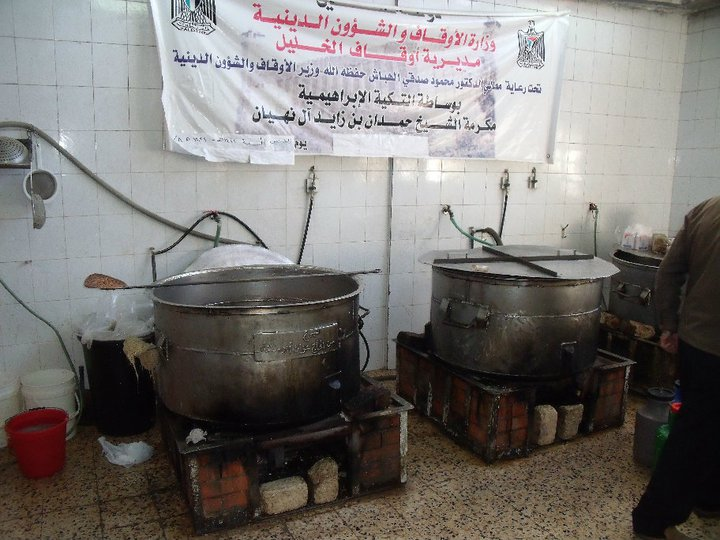
- The interior of the Takiya
- Named after: Prophet Ibrahim
- Founded: 1279; 747 years ago
- Founder: Qalawun
- Type: non-profit organization
- Location: Hebron Governorate – West Bank
- Region served: Palestine
- Formerly called: Al-Ribat

Takiat Ibrahim (Arabic: التكية الإبراهيمية, lit. 'Abraham's corner') is a charitable organization located near the Ibrahimi Mosque in the city of Hebron, in the West Bank. It is a soup kitchen that has been in operation since the 13th-century.

== History ==
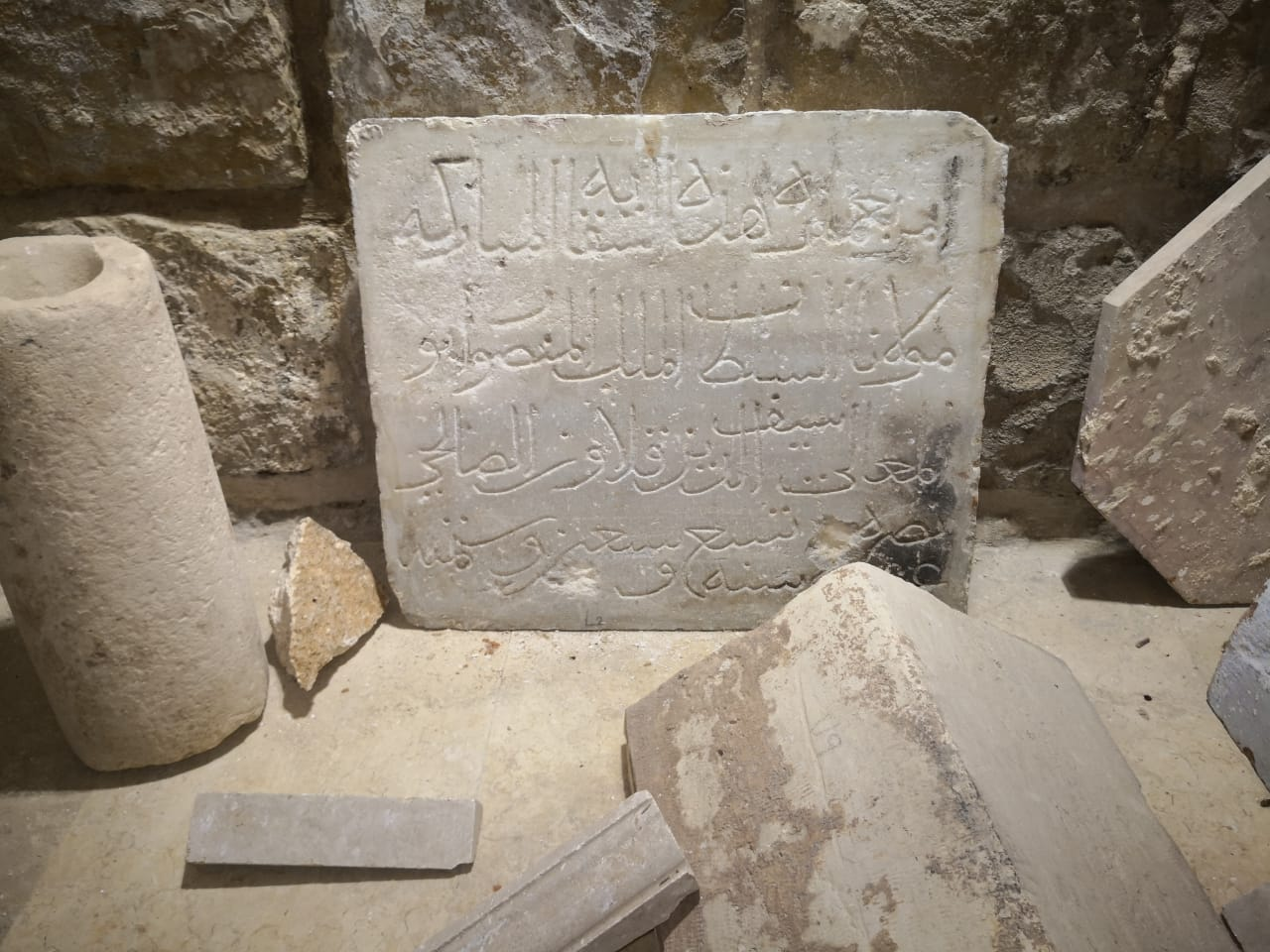
The marble inscription of the basin next to the hospice, crediting its renovation to Qalawun in the year 679

Early attestations of the simat are dated to the 11th century, by Persian poet Nasir Khusraw who observed it serving bread, a bowl of lentils cooked in olive oil, and raisins to visitors of Hebron daily.

The takiya dates is thought to date back to the time of the Prophet Abraham. It was officially established in 1279 CE by Sultan Al-Mansur Qalawun during the era of Salah al-Din al-Ayyubi (Saladin), then known as "al-ribat" (الرباط). It was initially established as a waqf for the benefit of the fuqarāʼ (the poor). An Arabic language inscription on a slab of marble was originally fixed above the gate of the ribat, which credits Qalawun with the establishment of the ribat, as well as dating its establishment to year 679 AH (1280/1281 CE). The original building has since been demolished, and the inscription was moved to the municipal museum of Hebron. Also in 679, Qalawun established a basin for drinking next to the hospice and the sanctuary, a marble slab, now transported to the local museum, is inscribed with a text crediting the renovation to Qalawun.

Historically, drums were sounded 3 times a day to announce that meals are ready.

In the 16th century, chronicler Mujir al-Din provided a description of the kitchen in Hebron; he stated that drums are struck at the door of the kitchen each day after the afternoon prayer, which is the time for distribution. He estimated the quantity of bread made each day at 14,000-15,000 loaves. He referred to the kitchen as al-simat al-karim, and called it "one of the wonders of this world", he further stated that both locals and outsiders visited the kitchen.

=== Ottoman Era ===
The pre-Ottoman soup kitchen was adopted by the new Ottoman rules following their conquest, it appears once in the Ottoman record in 1553, in which its said to receive 10,000 akçe from the treasury of Egypt, and 2,000 mudd of wheat for bread making.

During the 16th and 17th centuries during Ottoman rule, a significant portion of the income of both the sanctuary of Abraham as well as the Haseki Sultan Imaret in Jerusalem came in the form of olive oil, which was stored in vacant soap factories; oil was taken out and sold off to fund items like food for the soup kitchen. During that period, both kitchens continued to feed the poor twice a day.

17th-century Ottoman explorer Evliya Çelebi recounted a public kitchen in Hebron on one of his visits, in his writings, he mentions being served a bowl of "the soup of Abraham", he further stated that each person had his bowl filled with that soup, which was "enough for the subsistence of men with their families."

=== Modern history ===
The takiyya has been relocated twice during its modern history, but remained in the Old City of Hebron, and close to the Sanctuary of Abraham. The hospice was initially adjacent to the Sanctuary but has since been moved due to limited Palestinian access to the Sanctuary. In 1983, the Awqaf directorate moved the takiyya was moved to a new building to the north of Sanctuary.

In 2026, Anadolu Agency reported that the monthly costs of running the kitchen totaled 250,000 NIS (then 80,600 USD). It also reported that before the 2023 Gaza War, the kitchen consumed 300kg of meat daily, which increased to 700kg daily due to the deteriorating economic situation in the West Bank, where the Palestinian economy shrunk by 25% during Q4 of 2023.

== Names ==
The word takiyya is often used to refer to soup kitchens, but can also translate to hospice, poorhouse, or imaret. The word takiyya itself is of Ottoman Turkish origin.

The takiyya has multiple names, one name historically used was Al-Tablaniyya (Arabic: الطبلانية), the Arabic name references the traditional use of drums (Arabic: طبل, romanized: ṭabl, lit. 'drum') to announce meals. Other names for it include Al-Ribat (Arabic: الرباط).

In English, it is sometimes referred to as "The Abrahamic Hospice".

== Significance ==
The kitchen operates to this day, it provides free meals to the poor and needy families throughout the year, especially during the month of Ramadan.

The number of daily visitors served ranges between 2000 and 4000, during Ramadan, it consumes thousands of kilograms of meat a day, during the month of Ramadan in 2020, amid the COVID-19 pandemic, the kitchen served upwards of 10,000 meals a day during the first few days of the month, and half a million meals during its entire duration by the end of the it.

Some sources state that Takiat Ibrahim is the oldest known Takiya.

The soup kitchen has contributed to Hebron's reputation as "the city where no one sleeps hungry".

== Modern-day operation ==
The charity relies on donations from local businessmen, Arab and non-Arab delegations, as well as private donations. The Turkish Cooperation and Coordination Agency helped renew the hospice, as well as provide meals.

The kitchen does not use a name list for recipients and instead operates on a "first come, first serve" basis. The food offered includes meats, chicken, and a freekeh soup called "Prophet Abraham's soup" (Arabic: شوربة سيدنا إبراهيم, lit. 'Our master Ibrahim's soup'); the soup is offered to anyone regardless of economic background.

== Gallery ==
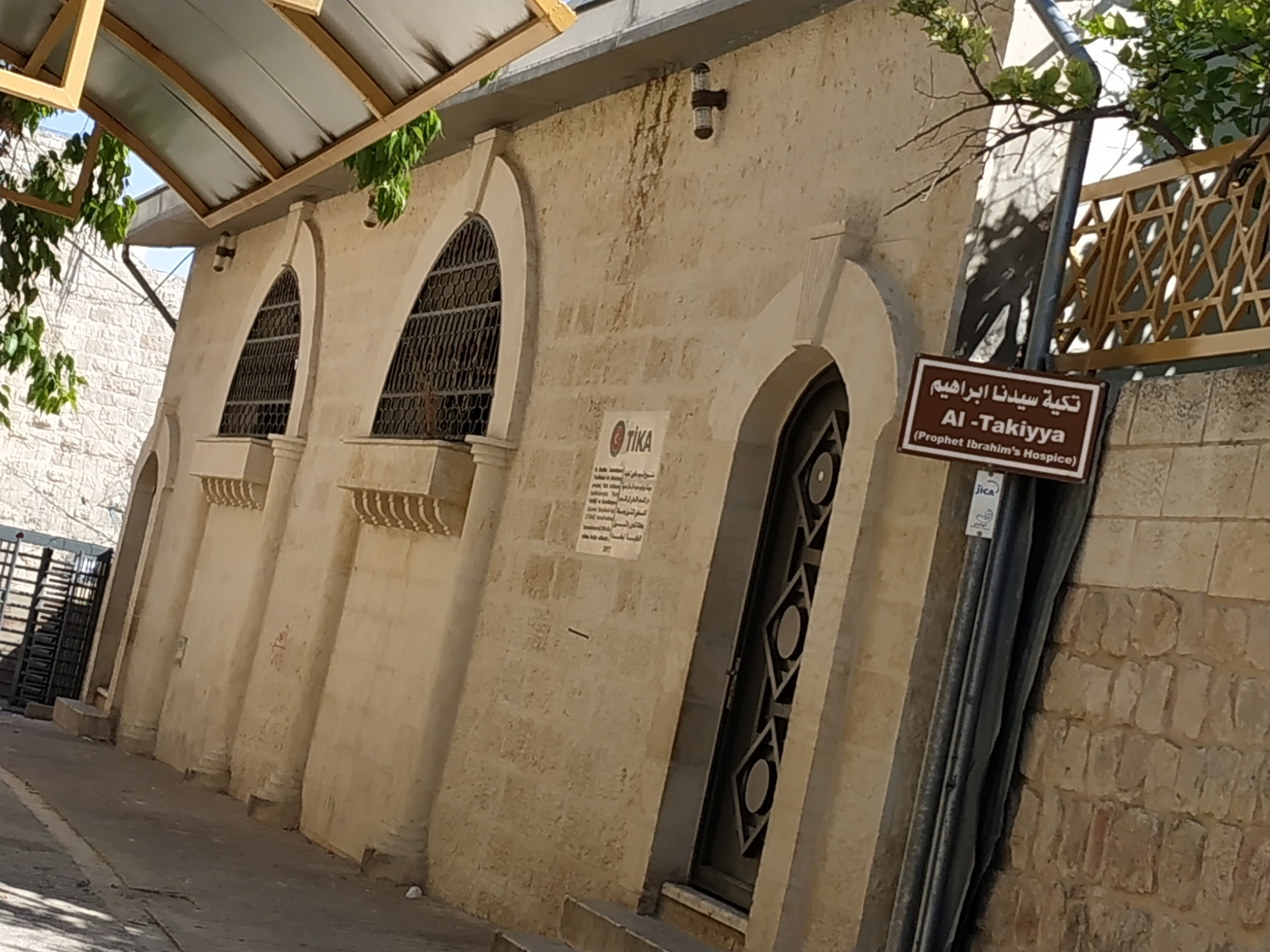
The exterior of Al-Takiya, its name visible on the sign, a sign referencing the Turkish Cooperation and Coordination Agency can also be seen

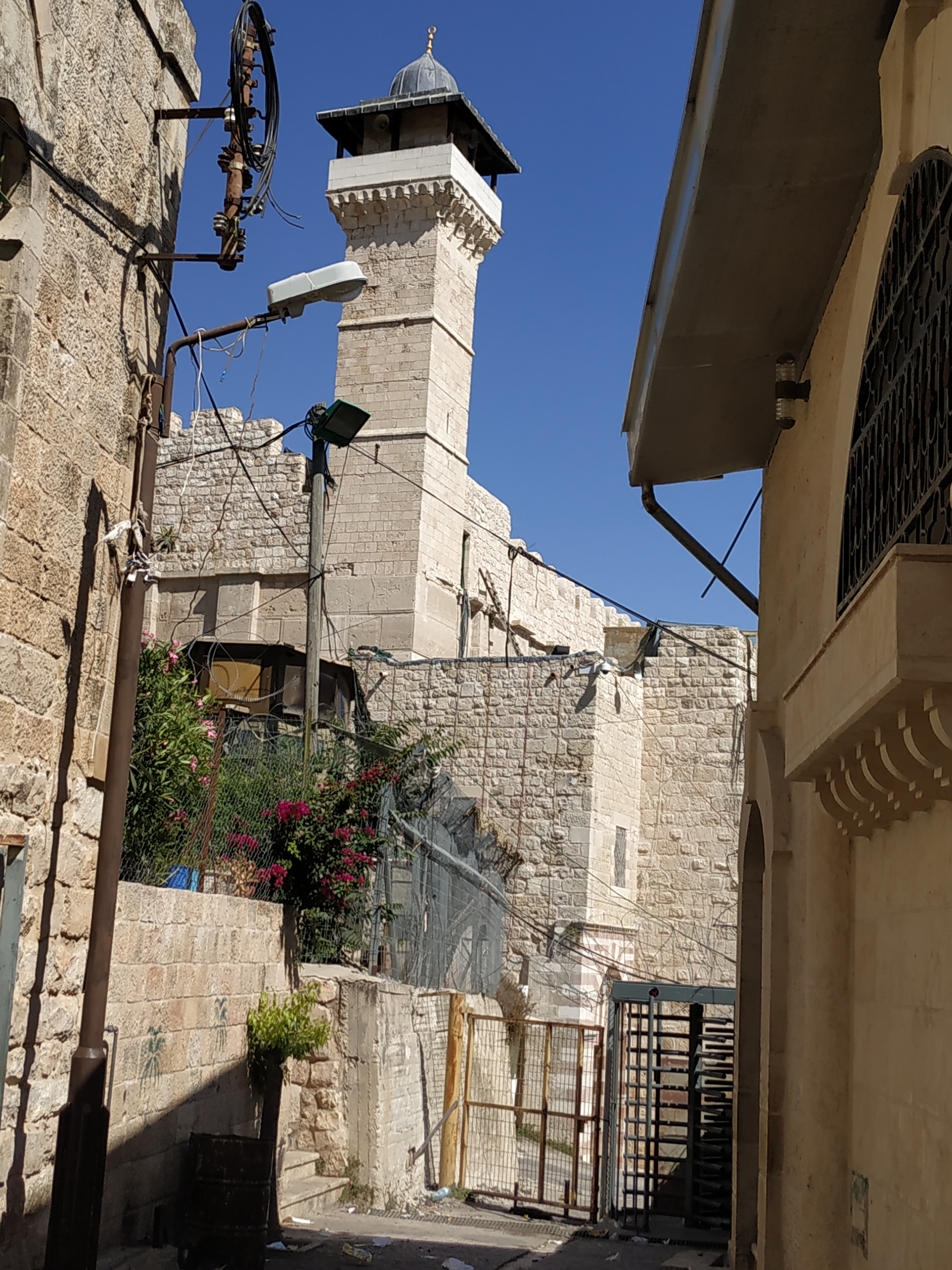
The Sanctuary of Abraham as seen from the Takiya, the exterior of the Takiya can be seen on the right, an Israeli checkpoint is seen in the way

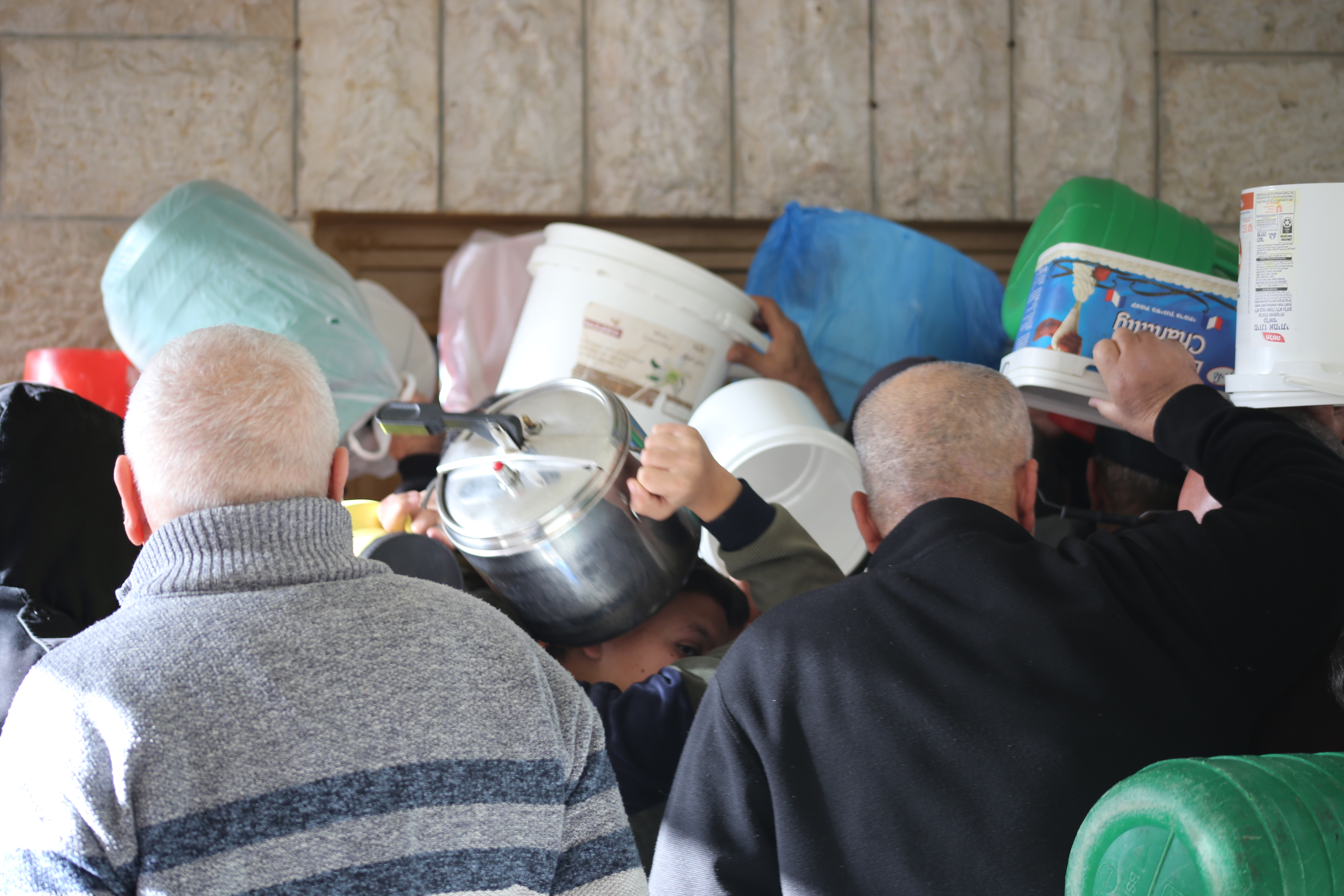
A group of people inside the building with containers waiting for food, 2025

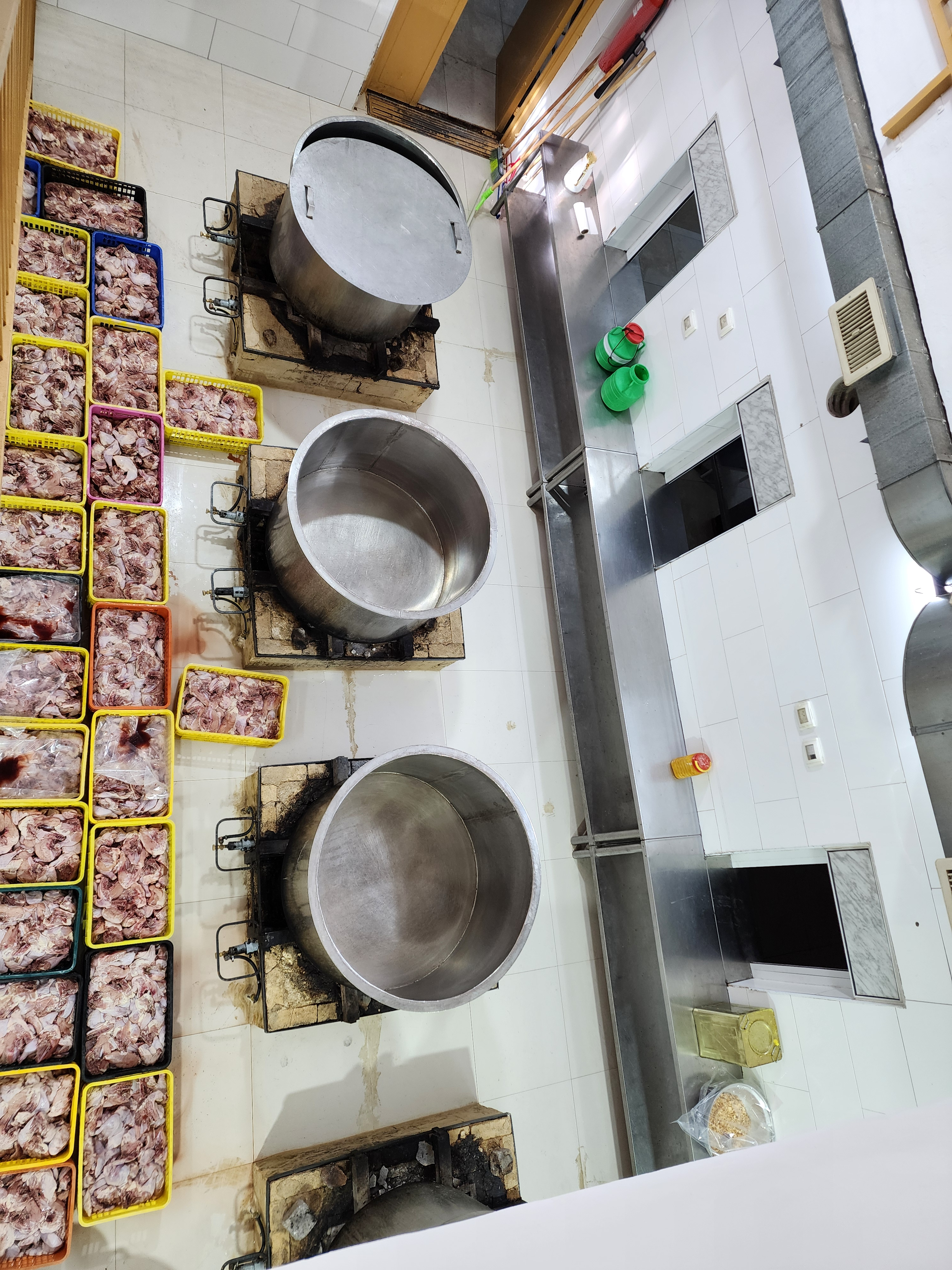
Raw chicken and clean pots in preparation for the cooking

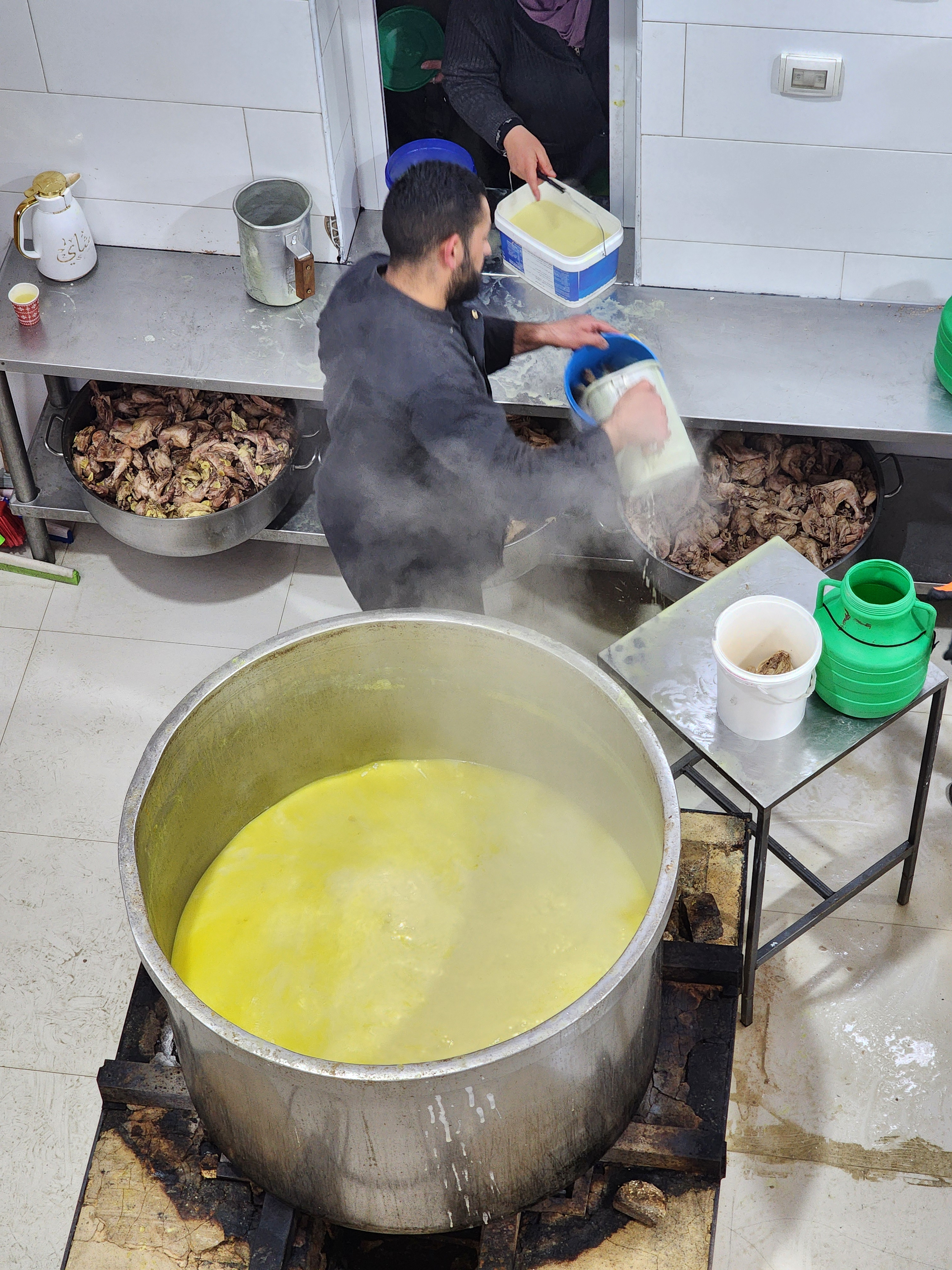
Food being served, a pot of meat and rice is seen under the counter

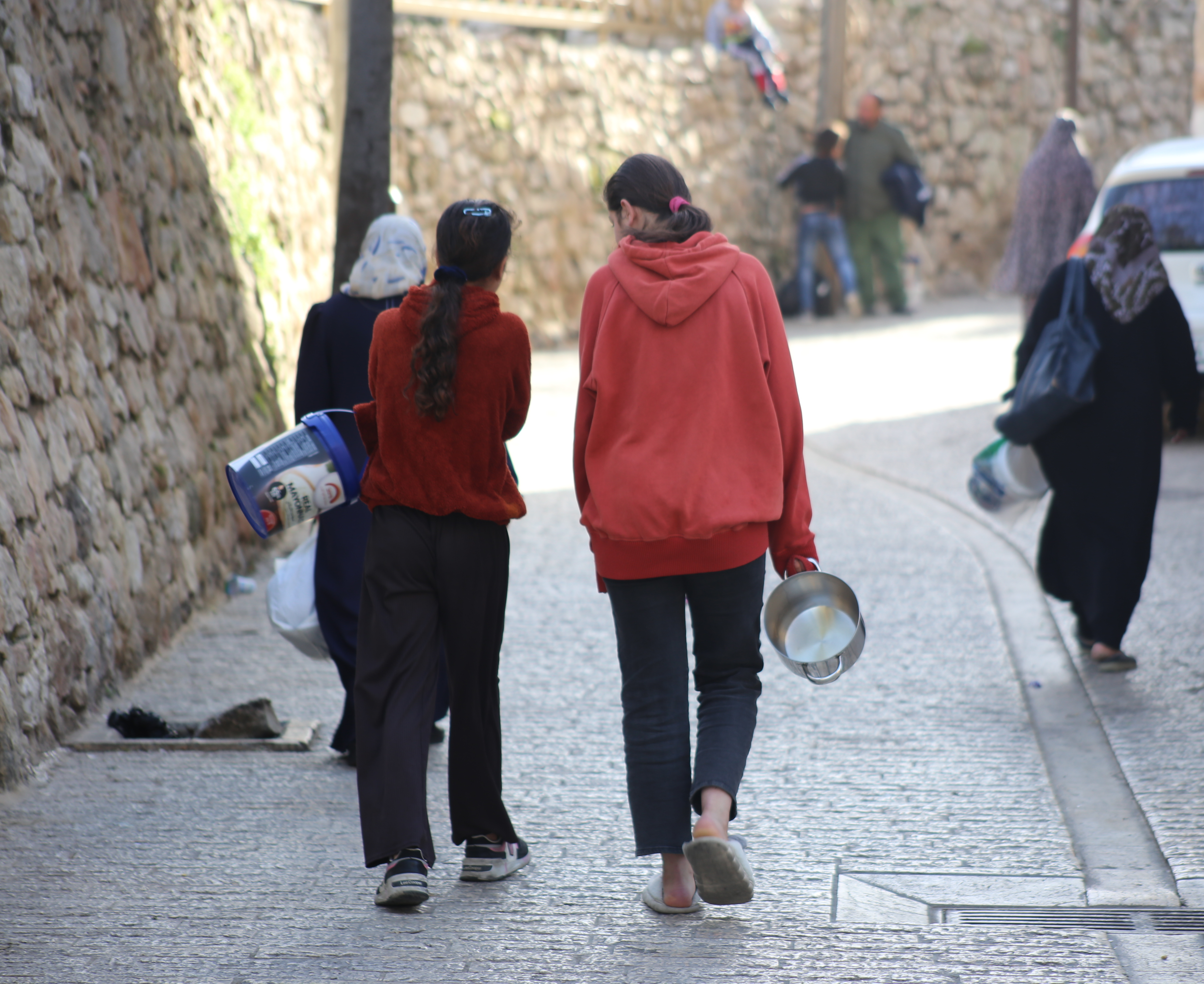
People with empty food vessels heading towards the Takia through the old city of Hebron

== See also ==
- Tkiyet Nabi Nuh
- Sulaymaniyya Takiyya
- Imaret
- Haseki Sultan Imaret
