= Al-Jawali Mosque =

Mosque in Hebron, West Bank, Palestine

- مسجد الجوالي
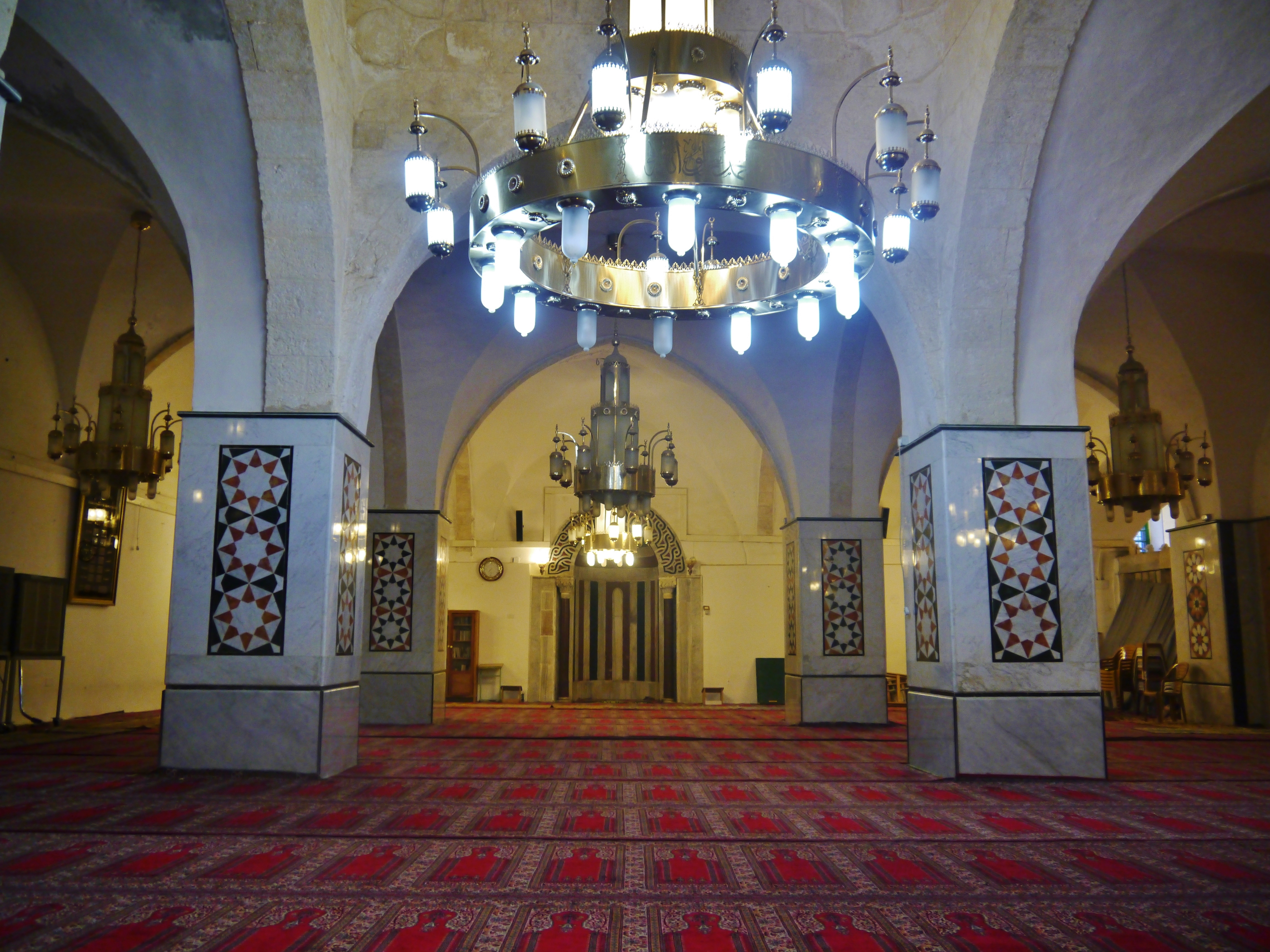
- The mosque interior in 2014

- Location of the mosque in the West Bank

Religion
- Affiliation: Sunni Islam
- Ecclesiastical or organizational status: Mosque
- Status: Active

Location
- Location: Hebron, West Bank,
- Country: Palestine
- Interactive map of Al-Jawali Mosque
- Coordinates: 31°31′30″N 35°06′39″E

Architecture
- Style: Mamluk
- Completed: 1320
- Dome: 1

Al-Jawali Mosque or Amir Sanjar al-Jawli Mosque (Arabic: مسجد الجوالي) is a mosque in Hebron, Palestine, located in the southwestern corner of the Old City and part of the Ibrahimi Mosque sanctuary.

== History ==
Al-Jawali Mosque was built on the orders of the Mamluk Governor of Gaza and Palestine, Sanjar al-Jawli, between 1318 and 1320 during the sultanate of an-Nasir Muhammad. Al-Jawli, for whom the mosque was named, constructed it to enlarge the prayer space to accommodate worshipers using the Ibrahimi Mosque. The mosque was built in an Aleppine architectural design. Fifteenth-century Egyptian historian al-Maqrizi noted that mosque's ceiling was made of "beautifully dressed stone."

According to English churchman Arthur Penrhyn Stanley, the mosque was built on the tomb of Judah, which was destroyed in the process.

== Architecture ==
Al-Jawali Mosque was annexed to the Ibrahimi Mosque sanctuary and is an integral part of its layout, bordering the northeastern wall of that structure's enclosure. The remaining sides of the al-Jawali Mosque are hewn from stone and the mosque is not visible from the outside. The al-Jawali and Ibrahimi mosques are attached to each other by a passageway running parallel to the latter mosque's prayer hall.

The mosque consists of three arcades with intersecting vaults supported by large stone columns. Each of the arched passageways is covered by a dome. A stone dome with corners decorated by muqarnas design and mosaic windows is situated atop the middle of the prayer hall. The qibla wall's mihrab in the southeastern part of al-Jawali Mosque is carved into the rock of the mosque's walls and tiled with marble slabs decorated with tinted engravings. The mihrab also has a semi-dome which is also decorated with marble.

== See also ==
- List of mosques in Palestine
- Islam in Palestine
