= List of mosques in Palestine =

This is a list of mosques in Palestine. The Palestinian Central Bureau of Statistics documented 3,616 mosques in Palestine in 2021.

Name	Images	Location	Year/century	Remarks
Al-Aqsa		Jerusalem (East)	637	The whole compound is considered to be Al-Aqsa Mosque grounds which includes Qibli Mosque, Dome of the Rock, El-Marwani Mosque, Old Al-Aqsa Musalla, Al-Buraq Mosque and others.
Qibli Mosque (Al-Aqsa "main" Mosque)		Jerusalem (East)	637	Part of Al-Aqsa compound, and the first mosque built in the compound
Ibrahimi Mosque		Hebron	637	
Dome of the Rock		Jerusalem (East)	692	Part of Al-Aqsa compound, dome collapsed in 1015 and was rebuilt in 1022–23.
Old Al-Aqsa Musalla		Jerusalem (East)	7th century	Part of Al-Aqsa compound, renovated in 1927, and opened permanently in 1998
Great Mosque of Gaza		Gaza city (Old City)	7th century	destroyed in 2023
Sultan Ibrahim Ibn Adham Mosque		Jerusalem (East)	947-948	
Great Mosque of Nablus		Nablus	10th century	
Al-Buraq Mosque		Jerusalem (East)	10th century	Part of Al-Aqsa compound
Al-Khanqah as-Salahiyya Mosque		Jerusalem (East)	1190	
Mosque of Omar		Jerusalem (East)	1193	
Sayed al-Hashim Mosque		Gaza city (Old City)	12th century	damaged in October 2023
Umm al-Nasr Mosque		Beit Hanoun	1239	destroyed in November 2023, during the Gaza war
Nabi Yahya Mosque		Sebastia	1261	
Sheikh Ali al-Bakka Mosque		Hebron	1282	
Al-Khadra Mosque		Nablus	1290	
Aybaki Mosque		Gaza city	13th century	destroyed in 16 September 2025, during the Gaza war
Al-Qaymariyya Mosque		Jerusalem (East)	13th century	
Al-Shamah Mosque		Gaza city (Old City)	1315	
Amir Sanjar al-Jawli Mosque		Hebron	1320	
Ibn Marwan Mosque		Gaza city	1324	damaged in c. 2024
Zofor Domri Mosque		Gaza city	1360	destroyed in 2023
Ibn Uthman Mosque		Gaza city	1399-1400	destroyed in 2024
Sidna Omar Mosque		Jerusalem (East)	14th century	closed since 1967
Katib al-Wilaya Mosque		Gaza city (Old City)	1432	
Mahkamah Mosque		Gaza city	1455	destroyed in the 2014 Gaza War
Al Dissi Mosque		Jerusalem (East)	1487	
Al-Hamadiyya Mosque		al-Khader	15th century	
Al-Hanbali Mosque		Nablus	1527	
Fatima Khatun Mosque		Jenin	1566	
Mosque of Omar		Bethlehem	1860	
An-Nasr Mosque		Nablus	1935	
Abdeen Mosque		Jerusalem (East)	1939	
Al-Marwani Mosque		Jerusalem (East)	1996	Part of Al-Aqsa compound
Maqam Nabi Noah		Dura		
Al-Omari Mosque		Dura		
Jamal Abdel Nasser Mosque		Ramallah		
Abu Khadra Mosque		Sabraa		destroyed by Israeli forces in 2012
Sheikh Zakariyya Mosque		Gaza city		damaged in c. 2024
Omari Mosque		Jabalia		damaged in c. 2024
Bilal ibn Rabah		Bethlehem		
Hayat Mosque		Jerusalem (East)		
Al-Nurayn Mosque		Qusra		
Ishaqiyyah Mosque		Hebron		
al-Qazzazeen Mosque		Hebron		
Shiekh Zayid Mosque		Jenin		
Al-Masakin Mosque		Nablus		
Al-Tina Mosque		Nablus		
Ein Misbah Mosque		Ramallah		
Mosque of Lower Ramallah		Ramallah		
Al-Khader Mosque		Deir al-Balah		
