= Jamal Abdel Nasser Mosque =

Mosque in the city of Al-Bireh, Ramallah and Al-Bireh Governorate, Palestine

- مسجد جمال عبد الناصر
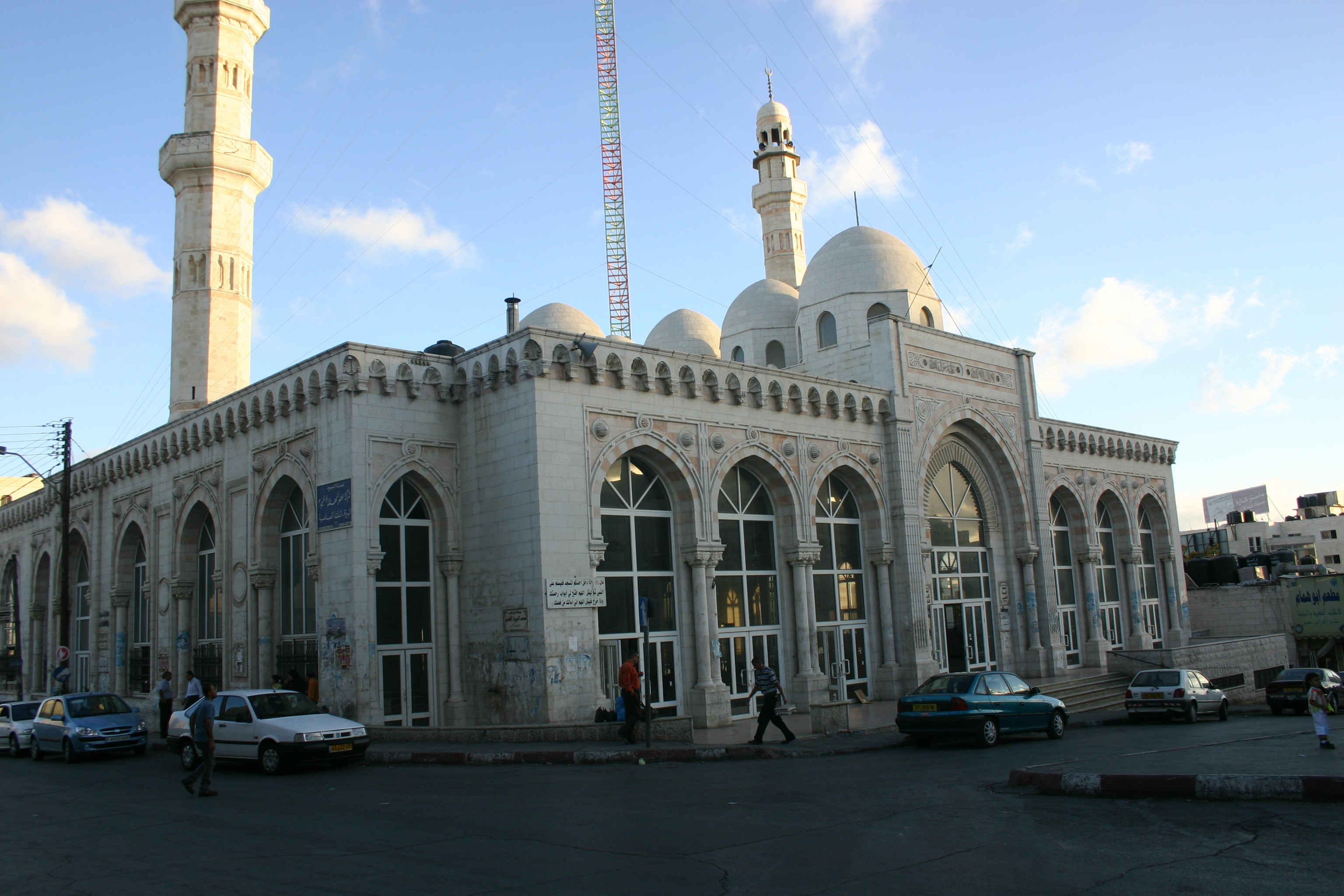

- Location within the West Bank

Religion
- Affiliation: Islam
- Branch/tradition: Sunni

Location
- Location: Al-Bireh, West Bank, Palestine
- Interactive map of Jamal Abdel Nasser Mosque
- Coordinates: 31°54′14.27″N 35°12′27.08″E

Architecture
- Type: mosque

Specifications
- Dome: 6
- Minaret: 2

Jamal Abdel Nasser Mosque (Arabic: مسجد جمال عبد الناصر Masjid Jamal 'Abd an-Nasser) is the largest mosque in al-Bireh, West Bank, Palestine. Located in the Downtown district of the city, the mosque is named after the late Egyptian president and Arab leader Gamal Abdel Nasser.

On March 14, 2002, the Israeli Army (IDF) took over the mosque and used its minaret for sniping, killing four Palestinians.

On September 22, 2007, dozens of wives of Hamas-affiliated political prisoners and other female Hamas members marched from the Jamal Abdel Nasser Mosque to Al-Manara Square in protest of what they saw as the politically motivated detentions of their relatives by the Palestinian Authority (PA). They were prevented from reaching the square when PA security forces used tear gas to disperse them.

== See also ==
- List of mosques in Palestine
- Islam in Palestine
