= Al-Hamadiyya Mosque =

Mosque in al-Khader, West Bank, Palestine

- مسجد الحمادية
- Location of the mosque in the West Bank

Religion
- Affiliation: Sunni Islam
- Ecclesiastical or organizational status: Mosque
- Status: Active

Location
- Location: al-Khader, West Bank
- Country: Palestine
- Interactive map of Al-Hamadiyya Mosque
- Coordinates: 31°41′50″N 35°9′48″E

Architecture
- Style: Mamluk
- Completed: early 15th century

Specifications
- Dome: 1
- Minaret: 1

The Al-Hamadiyya Mosque (Arabic: مسجد الحمادية, romanized: Masjid al-Hamadiyya) is a mosque in the town of al-Khader, west of Bethlehem, in the State of Palestine. The mosque was built in the early 15th century and was restored by the town's residents in the 1990s.

According to the International Middle East Media Center, in 2008, a group of Israeli settlers from Efrata and El'azar torched the mosque using stolen beehives as fuel. The mosque's imam and local Muslim leadership requested help from the Palestinian National Authority to help rebuild the mosque and to protect al-Khader from future attacks.

== See also ==
- List of mosques in Palestine
- Islam in Palestine
