= Al-Omari Mosque, Dura =

Mosque in Dura, Hebron, West Bank, Palestine

Al-Omari Mosque
- مسجد العمري
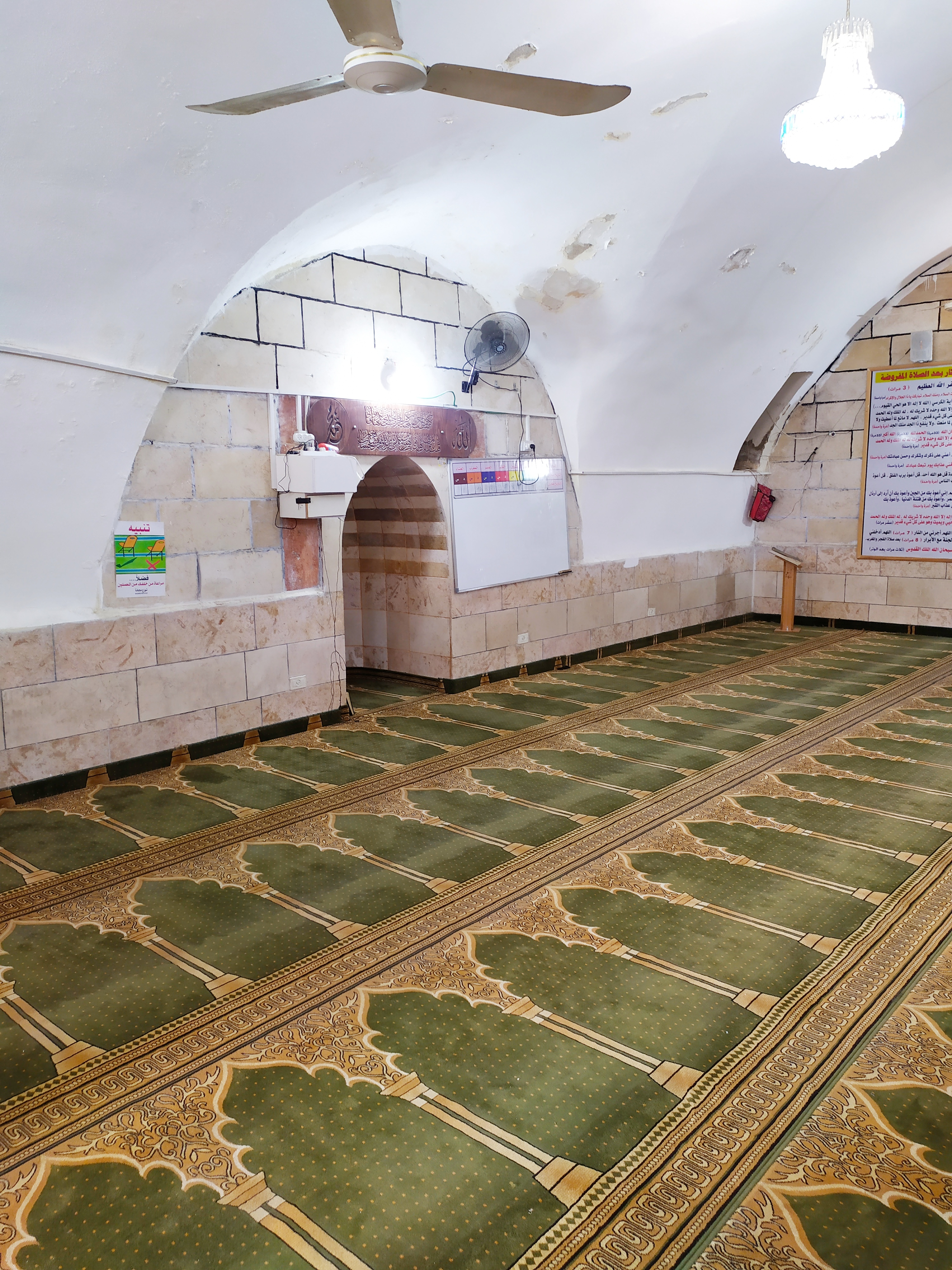
- The mosque interior in 2020

- Location of the mosque in the West Bank

Religion
- Affiliation: Islam, Sunni Islam
- Ecclesiastical or organisational status: Mosque
- Status: Active

Location
- Location: Dura, Hebron Governorate, West Bank
- Country: Palestine
- Interactive map of Al-Omari Mosque
- Coordinates: 31°30′26″N 35°01′41″E

The Al-Omari Mosque (Arabic: مسجد العمري) is a mosque located in the center of Dura, a city in Hebron Governorate, West Bank, Palestine. It is considered one of the city's most significant archaeological and historical landmarks, and one of the oldest mosques in Dura.

== History ==
The Omari Mosque in Dura was constructed during the Ottoman period. It is built from traditional, ancient stone and features a courtyard along with annexes that are distinctive to each mosque. The structure was erected on the ruins of earlier ancient buildings.

== Etymology ==
The Omari Mosque may have been named after Caliph Umar ibn al-Khattab, as many ancient mosques bearing the name "Omari" were built throughout Palestine and the broader Muslim world. These mosques date from the Umayyad, Ayyubid, and Ottoman periods, and many of them still stand today.

== See also ==
- Levantine archaeology
- List of mosques in Palestine
- Islam in Palestine
