= Maqam Nabi Noah =

Mosque and shrine in Dura, West Bank, Palestine

- مقام النبي نوح
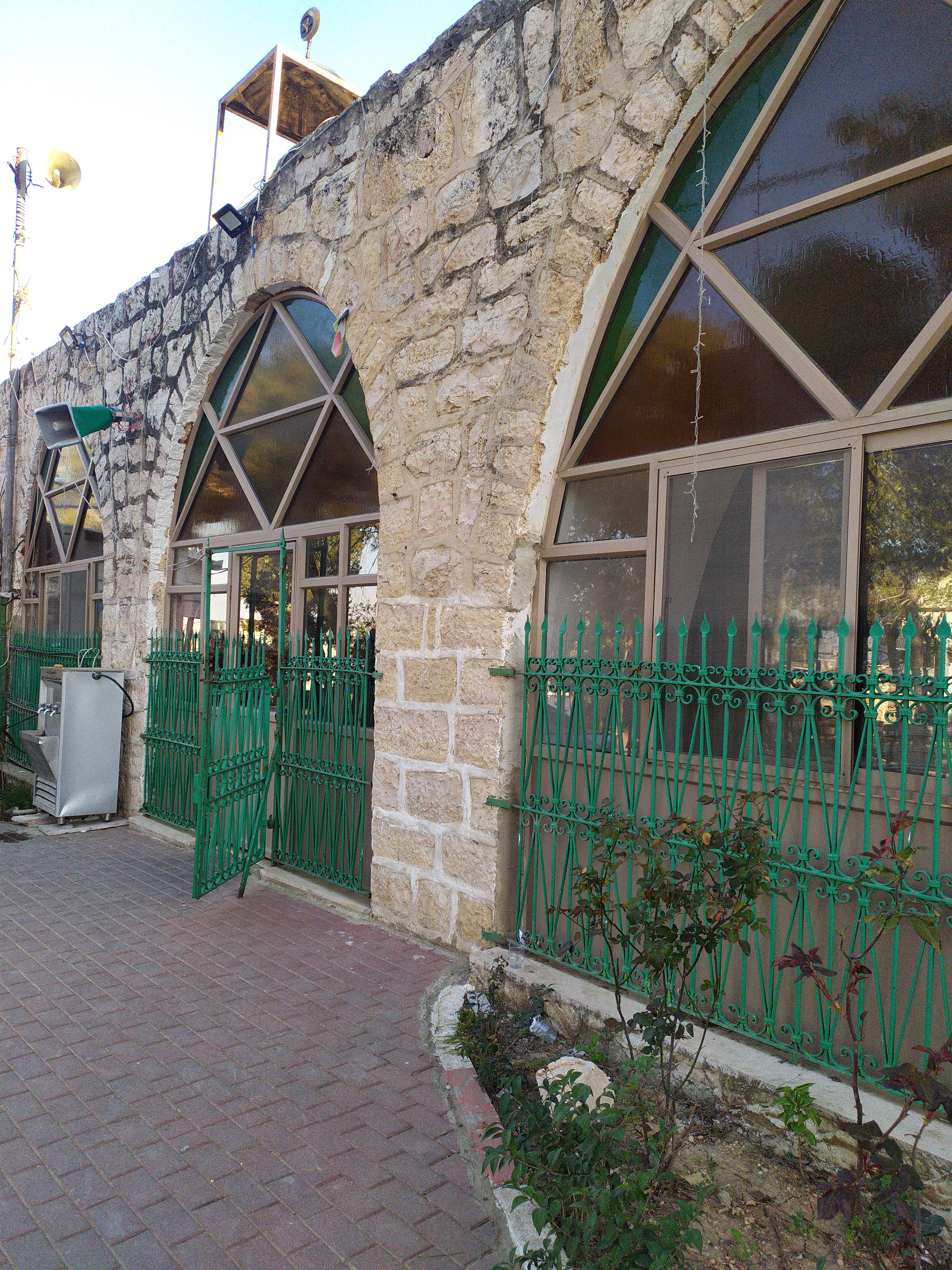
- The mosque and shrine entrance in 2023

- Location of the complex in the West Bank

Religion
- Affiliation: Islam
- Ecclesiastical or organizational status: Mosque and maqam
- Status: Active

Location
- Location: Dura, Hebron Governorate
- Country: Palestine
- Interactive map of Maqam Nabi Noah
- Coordinates: 31°30′22″N 35°01′28″E

Specifications
- Dome: 1
- Shrine: One: Noah

The Maqam Nabi Noah (Arabic: مقام النبي نوح) is a mosque and shrine in Dura, Hebron Governorate, West Bank, Palestine. The location is associated with Noah, who is a prophet in Islam.

== Description ==
The ancient historical building houses the shrine and a mosque, and is considered one of Dura's most important historical landmarks.

The building overlooks the city and includes a courtyard, a cemetery, a mosque, and other facilities. The site houses Prophet Noah's Hospice, which provides free food to visitors and the needy. Prayers are held regularly in the mosque and courtyard, especially during the holy month of Ramadan.

== See also ==
- Levantine archaeology
- List of mosques in Palestine
- Islam in Palestine
