= Tkiyet Nabi Nuh =

Charity in Dura, West Bank

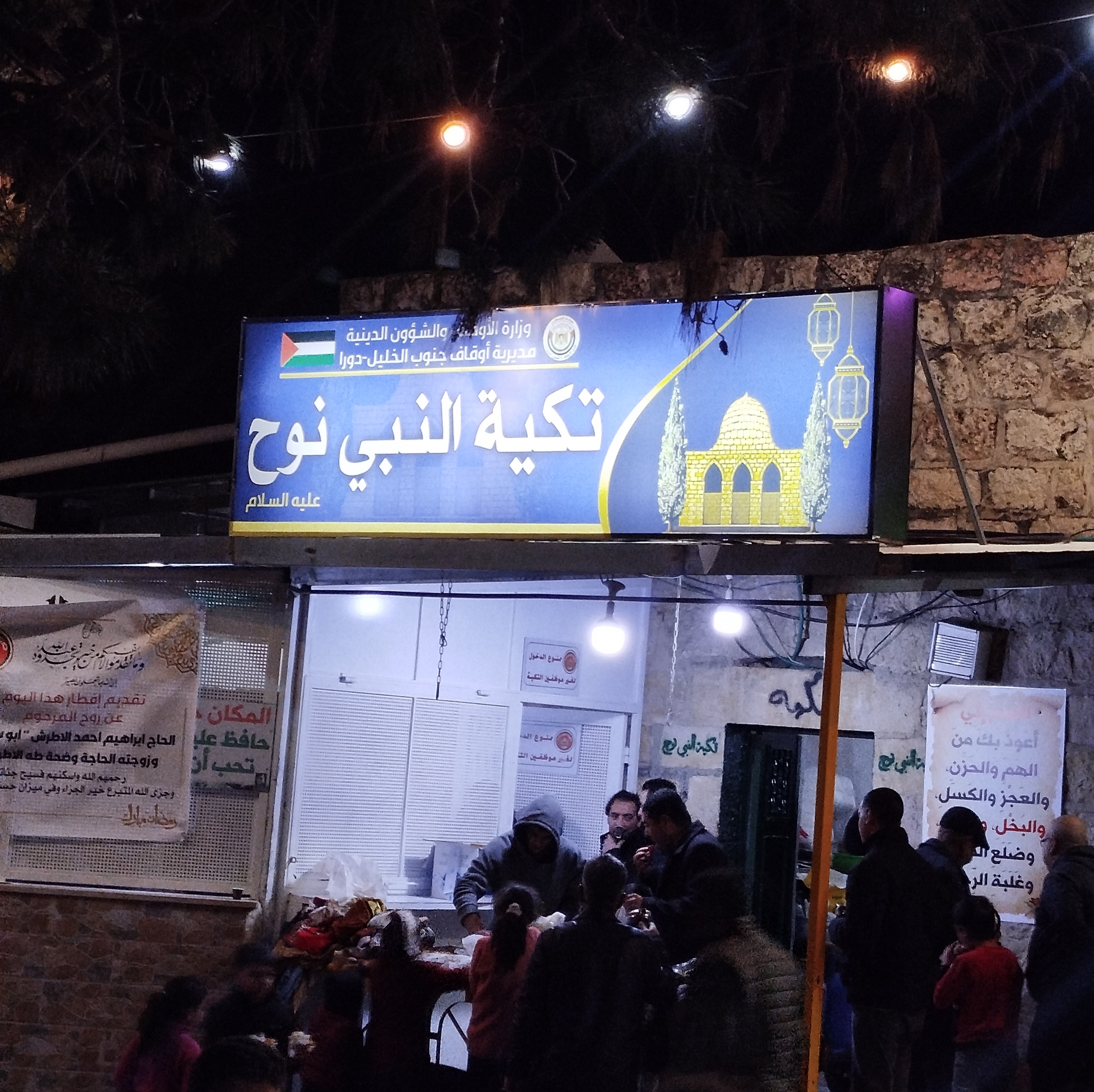
- Tekkiyeh of Prophet Noah in Dura
- Founded: 2017; 9 years ago
- Type: non-profit organization
- Location: Dura, Hebron, West Bank
- Region served: Palestine

Tkiyet Nabi Nuh (Arabic: تكية النبي نوح) is a charitable lodge located near the Mosque and Maqam Nabi Noah in the city of Dura the Hebron Governorate of the West Bank.

== Activities ==
It provides free meals to the poor and needy families throughout the year, especially during the month of Ramadan. The soup kitchen is operated by volunteers, the foods offered include, chicken, freekeh soup, and rice.

== History ==
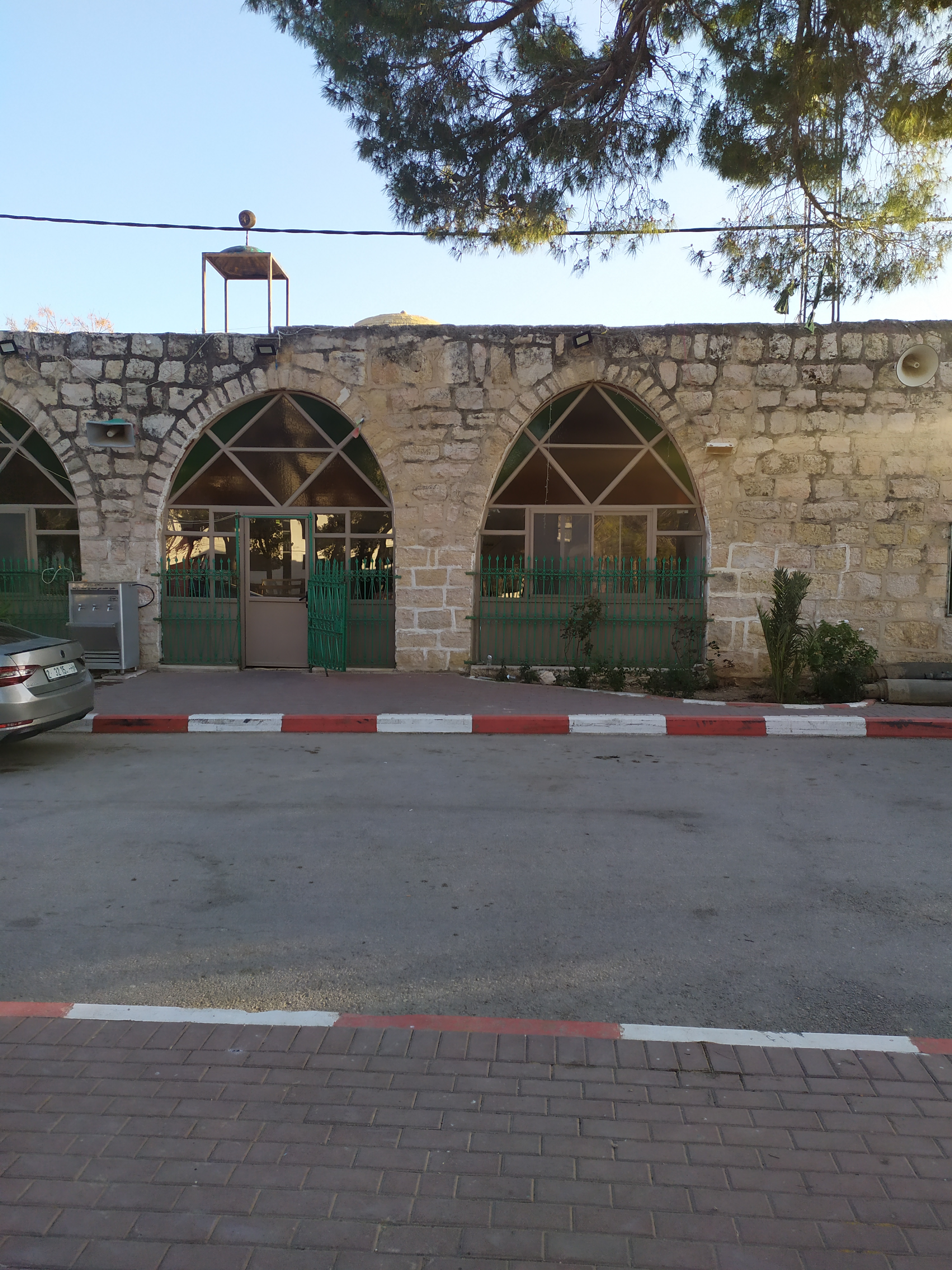
Mosque and Shrine of Prophet Noah in Dura

It was re-established in 2017. The origins of the Takiyah date back to the time of Prophet Noah. In the past, it used to offer meals every Thursday, consisting of crushed wheat (jareesh), to visitors of the shrine and those in need.

== Administration ==
The Al-Tekkiyeh of Prophet Noah Charity is supervised by a committee appointed by the Palestinian Ministry of Awqaf and Islamic Affairs.
