= Mosque of Omar (Bethlehem) =

Mosque in Bethlehem, West Bank, Palestine

- مسجد عمر
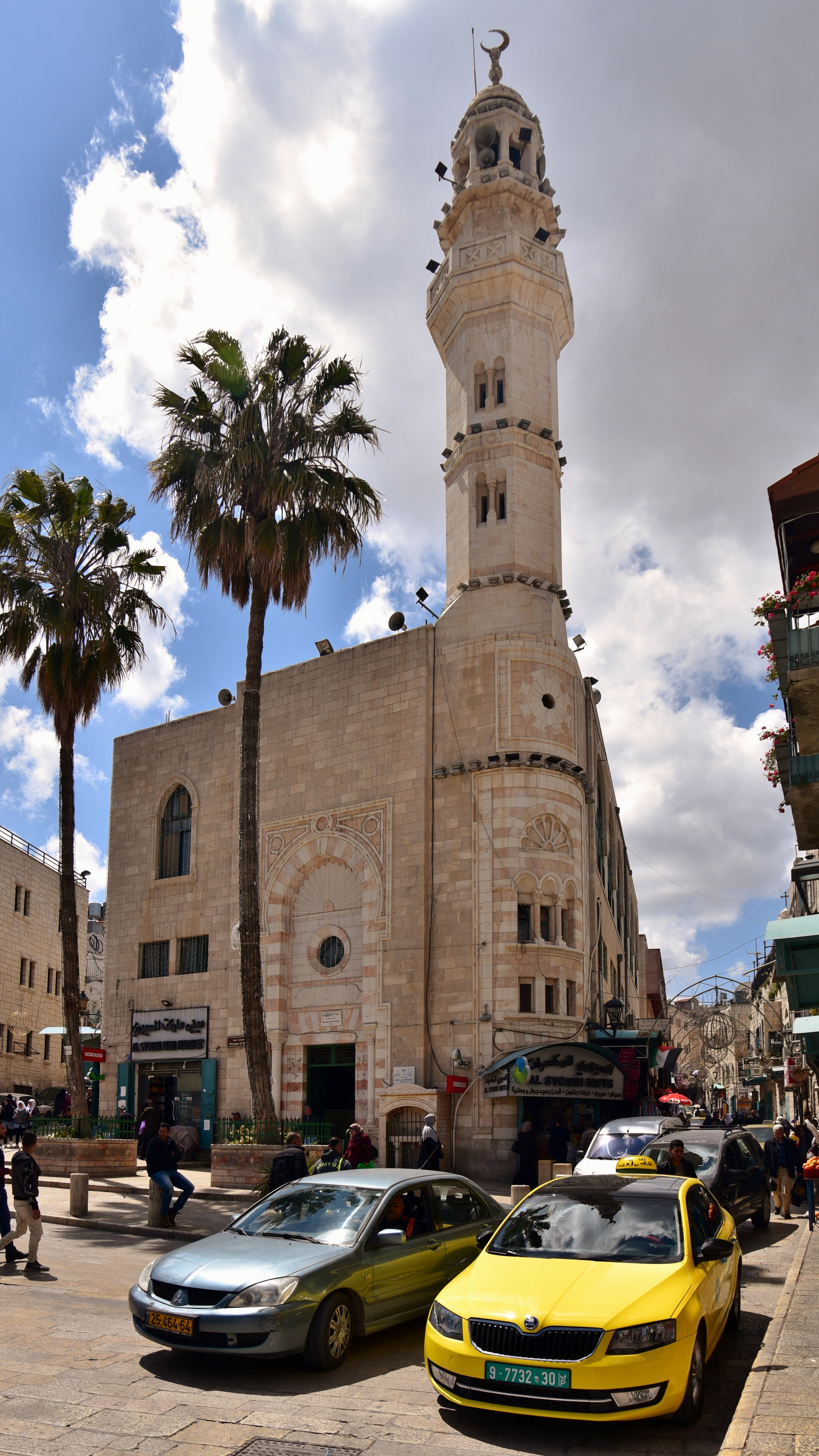
- The mosque in 2019

- Location of the mosque in the West Bank

Religion
- Affiliation: Islam
- Ecclesiastical or organizational status: Mosque
- Status: Active

Location
- Location: Bethlehem, West Bank
- Country: Palestine
- Interactive map of Mosque of Omar
- Coordinates: 31°42′16.34″N 35°12′20.03″E

Architecture
- Completed: 1860
- Minaret: 1

The Mosque of Omar (Arabic: مسجد عمر, romanized: Masjid Umar) is a mosque located in the Old City of Bethlehem, in the West Bank, in the State of Palestine. It is situated on the west side of Manger Square, across the square from the Church of the Nativity.

== History ==
=== Early Muslim period; location ===
The mosque is named after Omar (Umar) ibn al-Khattab (c. 581–644), the second Rashidun Caliph. Having conquered Jerusalem, Omar had travelled to Bethlehem in 637 CE to issue a law that would guarantee respect for the shrine and safety of Christians and clergy. Only four years after the death of the Islamic prophet Muhammad, Omar allegedly prayed at the location of the mosque.

Yaqut al-Hamawi (d. 1229) relates how Caliph Omar was advised by a Christian monk to build a mosque in an arcaded building or haniyya, rather than transform the Church of the Nativity into a mosque. Yaqut places the haniyya at a site where biblical kings David and Solomon were thought to be buried. In the early 10th century, Eutychius of Alexandria (877–940) describes the haniyya as placed within a Christian site, facing south and thus being appropriate for Muslim prayer (qibla), and mentions Omar as allowing Muslims to pray in the haniyya only one at a time; and prohibiting them to touch anything there, as well as to call for or conduct congregational prayers inside. Eutychius complained that in his time, the early 10th century, Muslims had broken these three rules. The evolution of the status of this site of prayer seems to have been from an arcaded space attached to a Christian building, where at first Muslims held only limited rights for performing prayers, to a congregational mosque starting from the early tenth century.

The exact location of the haniyya is not clear, but the place thought during late antiquity to be the burial site of David and Solomon was described by the Pilgrim of Bordeaux (330) as not far from the Basilica of the Nativity, and by the Piacenza Pilgrim (570) as half a Roman mile from the town centre.

=== Modern mosque at new location (1860) ===
The current mosque was built in 1860, on land given for the purpose by Jerusalem's Greek Orthodox Church. It was renovated in 1955 during Jordanian control of the city. In the past, before the advent of light bulbs, it was common for Muslims and Christians in Bethlehem to offer olive oil to light up the surroundings of the mosque, which was evidence of religious coexistence in the city.

==== Tensions (2000s) ====
On February 20, 2006, the Dalai Lama canceled his visit to the mosque, among other places, due to pressure from the government of China. The Palestinian National Authority had requested the cancellation. A foreign ministry official, Majdi al-Khaldi, told reporters,

"At the request of the Chinese government, we have not received or dealt with him given his separatist ambitions for Tibet.... Given our friendly relations with the Chinese government, which supports the Palestinian people, we asked the local (Bethlehem) authorities as well as civil society groups not to receive him and they acquiesced with our request.

In February 2007, Israel's Shin Bet security agency arrested 20 men who were allegedly recruited for a "Hamas-linked cell" by a Muslim cleric in the Mosque of Omar. Nevertheless, the mosque remained peaceful when Palestinian President Mahmoud Abbas visited on Christmas Eve 2007.

== Gallery ==
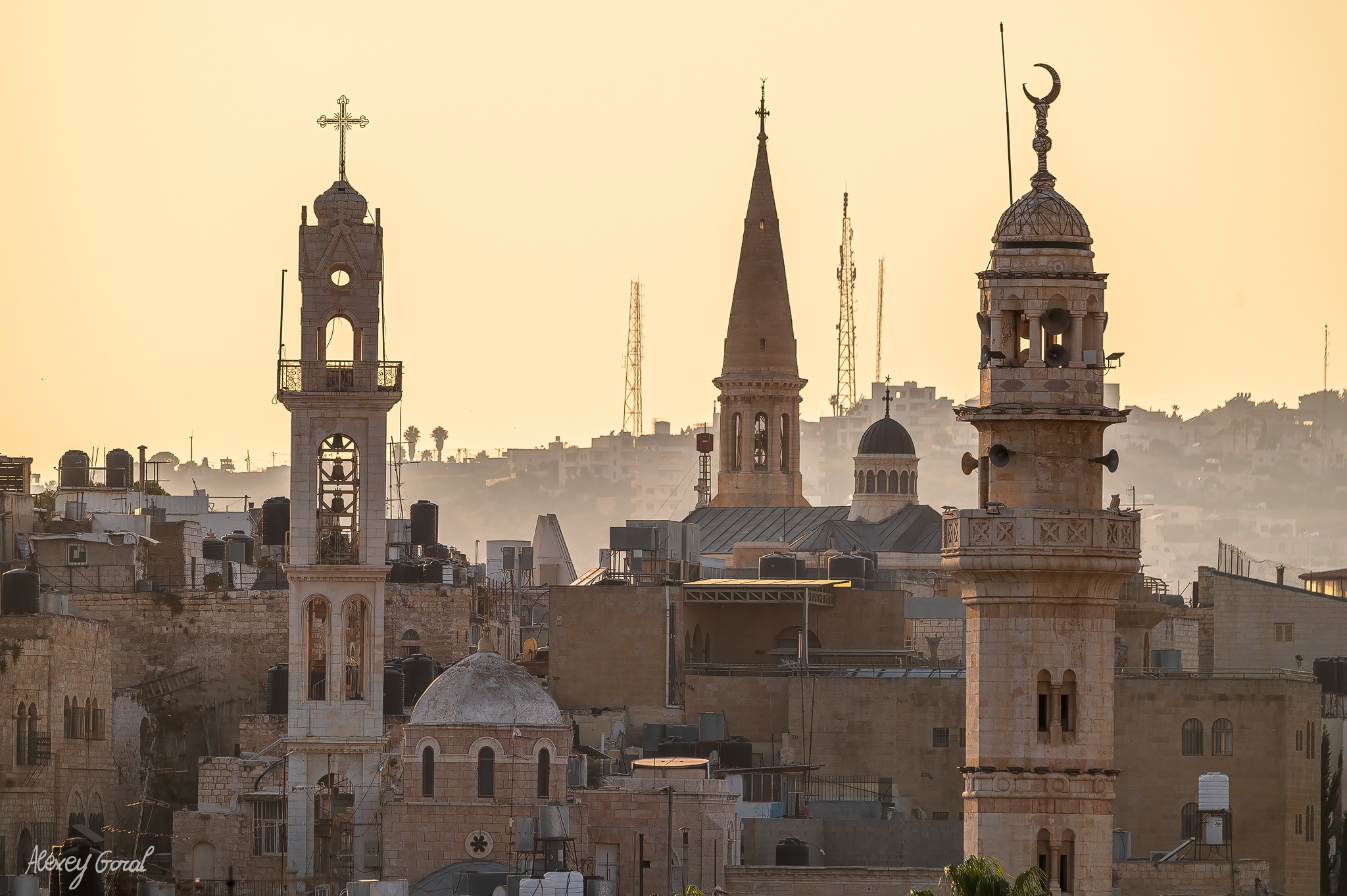

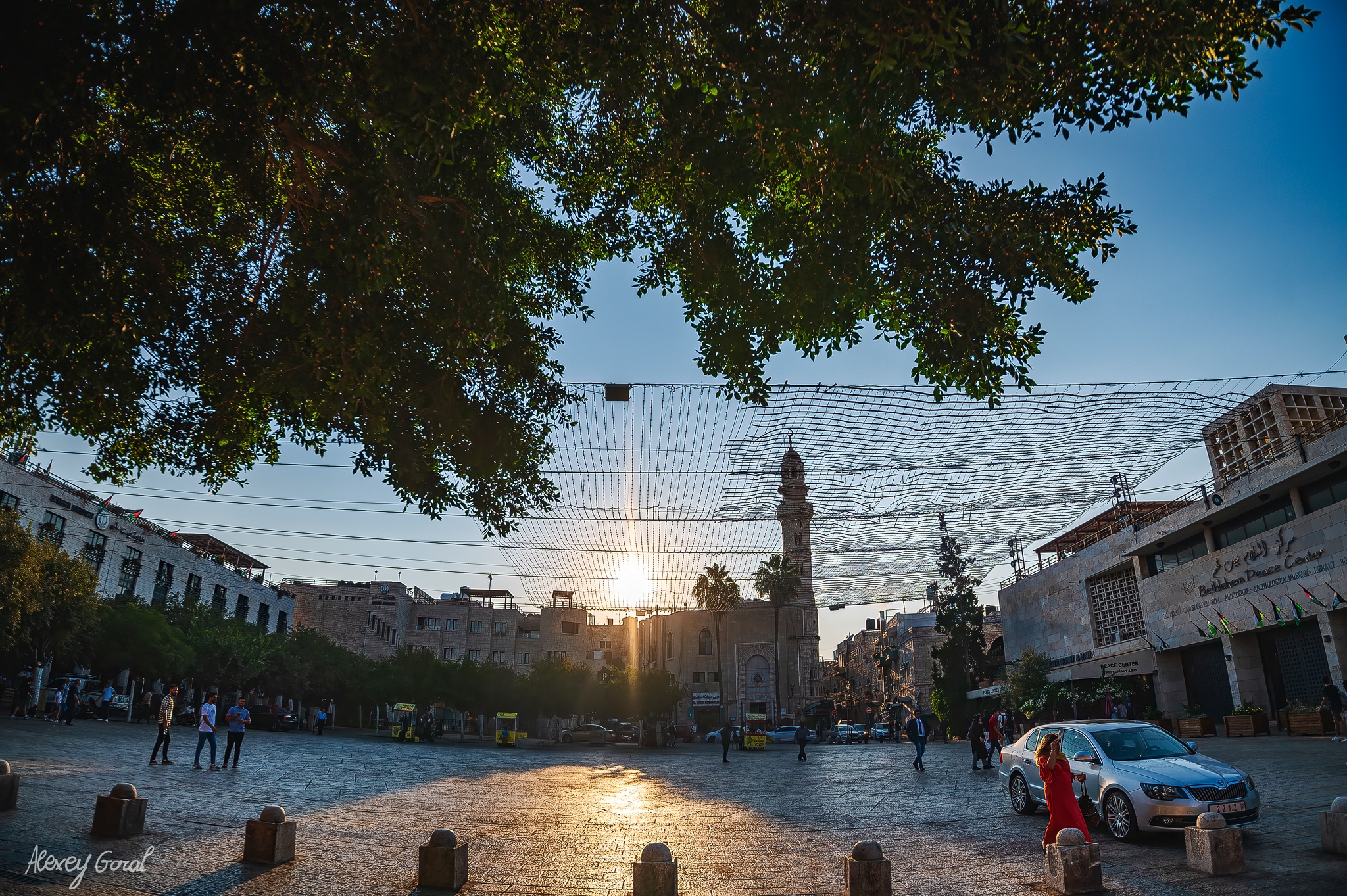

== See also ==
- List of mosques in Palestine
- Islam in Palestine
