= Al-Khader =

Palestinian village in the West Bank, Palestine

al-Khader
- Municipality type B

Arabic transcription(s)
  - Arabic: الخضر
  - Latin: al-Khadr (official)
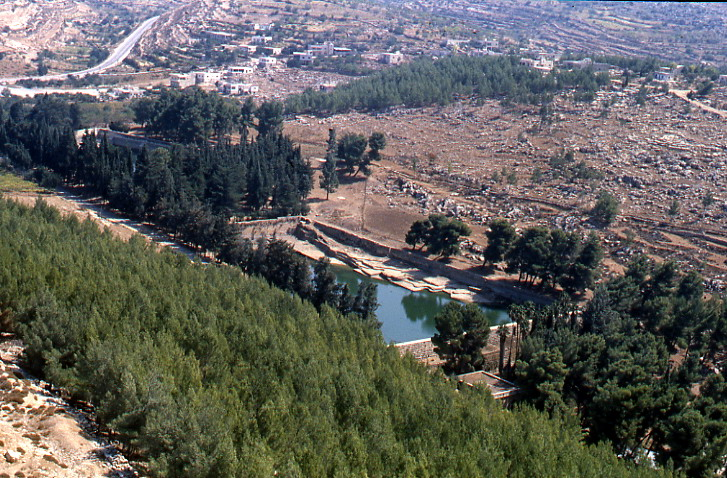
- Eastern al-Khader and Solomon's Pools

- Location of al-Khader within Palestine
- Coordinates: 31°41′34″N 35°09′59″E
- Palestine grid: 162/124
- State: State of Palestine
- Governorate: Bethlehem

Government
  - Type: Municipality
  - Head of Municipality: Ahmad Salah

Area
  - Total: 19.9 km^{2} (7.7 sq mi)

Population (2017)
  - Total: 11,960
  - Density: 601/km^{2} (1,560/sq mi)
- Name meaning: "the [town] of Saint George"

Al-Khader (Arabic: الخضر) is a Palestinian town in the Bethlehem Governorate in the south-central West Bank. It is located 5 kilometers (3.1 mi) west of Bethlehem. According to the Palestinian Central Bureau of Statistics, the town had a population of 11,960 in 2017. The area around al-Khader is marked by vineyards, and olive and fig trees.

Al-Khader was founded in the late 18th or early 19th century. Its main landmarks are Solomon's Pools, the Murad Fortress (a Turkish Ottoman castle built by Suleiman the Magnificent in 1617 to defend Solomon’s Pools, that today houses a Museum for Palestinian Culture and Heritage), the Monastery and Church of St. George, and Al-Hamadiyya Mosque.

== Name and St George tradition ==
Al-Khader, in Arabic literally "The Green One", is the modern name of the village, which was called "Casale S. Georgii" during the Crusader era. It is named after Saint George – who in Arab culture is associated with the Muslim figure of al-Khadr, "the green one". According to local tradition, Saint George was imprisoned at the location the current Monastery and Church of St. George stand. Chains displayed inside the church are said to be the ones that held him while he was imprisoned, and are said to have healing power.

== History ==
=== Iron Age ===
In 1953, a hoard of twenty-six arrowheads were discovered in al-Khader, five of them bearing inscriptions. dating from c. 1100 BCE. The inscriptions are in a transitional script, offering epigraphists the "missing link" between the pictographs of the Proto-Canaanite or Old Canaanite script, and the linear alphabetic Early Linear Phoenician script. The owner of the arrowheads "signed" them, the translation being "dart/arrow of 'Abd Labi't [son of] Bin-'Anat", both names known from the period (see for instance the warrior Shamgar Ben Anat from the biblical Song of Deborah, Judges 5:6).

=== Crusader period ===
During the Crusader era, the village was called Casale S. Georgii.

=== Mamluk period ===
Around 1421/1422 CE the Church of St. George was mentioned by Western traveler John Poloner as situated on a hill near Bethlehem.

=== Ottoman period ===
Al-Khader was founded as a subsidiary village of al-Walaja, emerging due to the Qays–Yaman war in the late 18th or early 19th century, during Ottoman rule. It was part of the political-administrative sheikdom and nahiyah ("subdistrict") of Bani Hasan, which was ruled by the Absiyeh family of al-Walaja. In 1838 it was recorded as a Muslim village by the English scholars Edward Robinson and Eli Smith, part of the Bani Hasan District, west of Jerusalem. In 1863 Victor Guérin found the village "reduced to two hundred inhabitants, almost all Muslims." He further noted remains of constructions, with rather large stones, which he thought were dated from an era prior to the Arab conquest.

Albert Socin notes that an official Ottoman village list from about 1870 documented el-chadr with a population of 122 in a total of 43 houses, though that population count only included men. It was further noted that the small Greek monastery served as a mental asylum. In 1882, the PEF's Survey of Western Palestine described al-Khader as a moderate-sized village with a "Greek church and convent." It was surrounded by vineyards and olive groves and "rock-cut tombs" were situated to the north of the village. It had a mixed population of Muslims and Greek Orthodox Christians, according to the Survey of Western Palestine. In 1896 the population of al-Khader was estimated to be about 210 people.

=== British Mandate ===
In the British Mandate 1922 census of Palestine, al-Khader had a population of 697; 694 Muslims and 3 Christians. By the 1931 census of Palestine, the population was 914, mostly Muslim with three Christian inhabitants.

In the 1945 statistics the town had 1,130 Muslim inhabitants and a total land area of 20,100 dunams. It was a part of the Jerusalem District. Of the land, 5,700 dunams were irrigated or used for plantations, 5,889 dunams were for cereals, while 96 dunams were built-up (urban) land.

The Orthodox Christian Church owns several hundreds of dunams made up of vineyards, olive groves and field crops. The lands were entrusted to them since the Rashidun era during the caliphate of Umar who presided over the conquest of Palestine in the 630s. Most of the land is leased to Muslim farmers.

=== Jordanian period ===
In the wake of the 1948 Arab–Israeli War, and after the 1949 Armistice Agreements, al-Khader came under Jordanian rule. It was annexed by Jordan in 1950.

In 1961, the population of al-Khader was 1,798.

=== Post-1967 ===
Since the Six-Day War in 1967, al-Khader has been under Israeli occupation. The population in the 1967 census conducted by the Israeli authorities was 2,051.

After the 1995 accords, 9% of al-Khader's land was classified as Area A land, 5.5% as Area B, and the remaining 85.5% as Area C.

Israel has confiscated land from al-Khader in order to construct two Israeli settlements:

- 27 dunams for Neve Daniyyel,
- 2 dunams for Efrat.

In 1997, the PCBS recorded a population of 6,802 of which 3,606 were males and 3,196 were females. Unlike many Palestinian towns in the area, refugees and their descendants do not have a substantial population in al-Khader. In 1997, 5.2% of the town's inhabitants were recorded as refugees. In the 2007 PCBS census, al-Khader had a population of 9,774.

Since the construction of the Israeli West Bank barrier around al-Khader, several thousand dunams of farmland have been separated from the village, with the inhabitants unable to access them without a permit. In 2006, 50 villagers protested the barrier by filling bags with grapes and selling them along Route 60. Israeli soldiers and police attempted to quell protesters resulting in the injuries and detainment of two residents.

In April 2015 villagers blocked work by settlers to create a bypass road for access to an illegal outpost, which, if completed, would alienate a further 400 dunams of village land.

== Geography and land ==
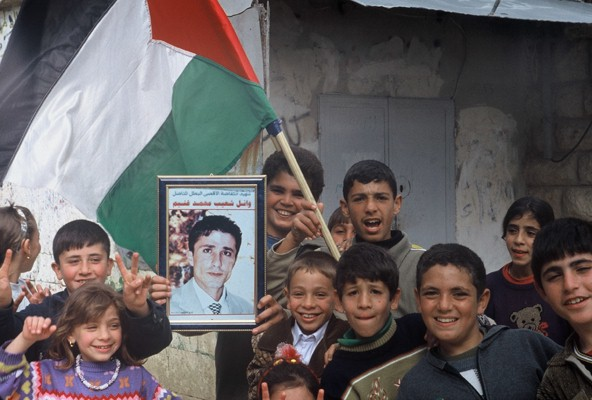
Funeral in Al-Khader, February, 2001

The older part of al-Khader is situated on a saddle-shaped hill facing a steep ridge to the south and open areas to the north, in the central highlands of the West Bank. Nearby localities include the Dheisheh Refugee Camp adjacent to the east, the village of Artas further to the east, Beit Jala to the northeast, al-Walaja and the Israeli settlement of Har Gilo to the north, Battir and Husan to the northwest, Nahalin and the Israeli settlements of Beitar Illit to the west, Neve Daniel to the southeast, and Elazar to the south.

== Culture ==
=== Historical and religious sites ===
The Orthodox Christian Monastery and Church of St. George and Solomon's Pools are the town's main tourist attractions. Al-Khader's main and oldest mosque is al-Hamadiyya Mosque. According to the International Middle East Media Center, in 2007, it was burned down by Israeli settlers. The mosque is about 700 years old and was restored by the Tourism Ministry of the Palestinian National Authority.

Next to Solomon's Pools stands the town's Convention Palace, amidst restored historic ruins that include the Murad Fortress, a Turkish Ottoman castle built by Suleiman the Magnificent in 1617 to defend Solomon’s Pools. The fortress also houses the Murad Castle Museum for Palestinian Culture and Heritage.

=== Cultural festivals ===
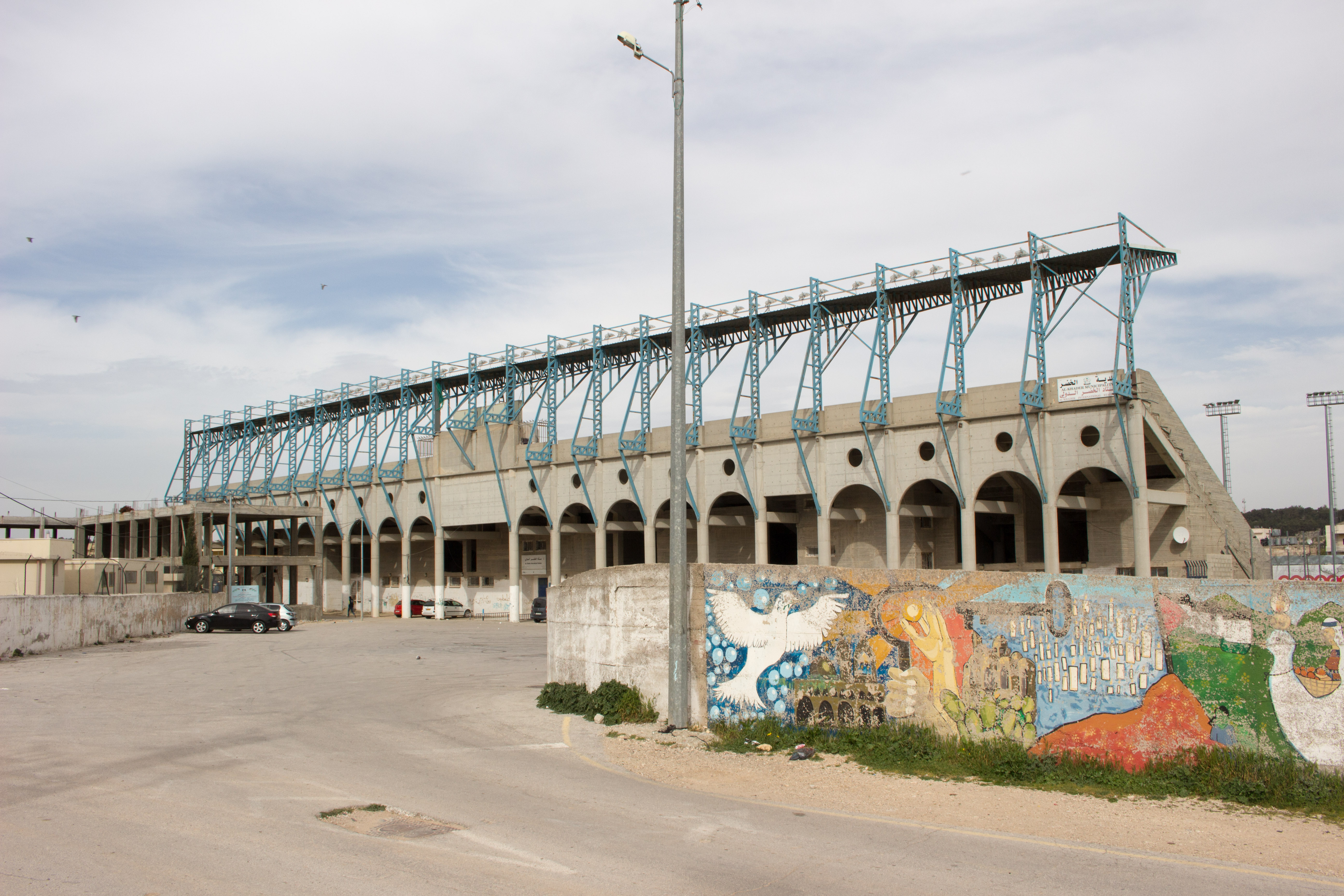
An outside view of Al-Khader Stadium

Al-Khader is also well known in the area for its peaches, grapes and apples. It hosts its annual Grape Festival every September. The festival was initiated by the al-Khader municipality to promote the town's primary agricultural product, grapes. Other exhibitions held at the festival include one on embroidery and knitting, a local heritage exhibition of mills, grinders, and harvest tools, and an exhibition of home-made grape products such as dibs (molasses made from grapes). Al-Khader Stadium, which holds up to 6,000 people, is located in the town.

== Government ==
Al-Khader is governed by a municipal council of thirteen members including the mayor. In the 2005 municipal elections, the Hamas-affiliated Reform list won the most seats (five), while the Fatah-affiliated Falasteen al-Ghad list won four seats. Two independent lists — Al-Aqsa and Abnaa al-Balad — each won two seats.

== Bibliography ==
- Barron, J.B., ed. (1923). Palestine: Report and General Abstracts of the Census of 1922. Government of Palestine.
- Conder, C.R.; Kitchener, H.H. (1883). The Survey of Western Palestine: Memoirs of the Topography, Orography, Hydrography, and Archaeology. Vol. 3. London: Committee of the Palestine Exploration Fund.
- Government of Jordan, Department of Statistics (1964). First Census of Population and Housing. Volume I: Final Tables; General Characteristics of the Population (PDF).
- Government of Palestine, Department of Statistics (1945). Village Statistics, April, 1945.
- Guérin, V. (1869). Description Géographique Historique et Archéologique de la Palestine (in French). Vol. 1: Judee, pt. 3. Paris: L'Imprimerie Nationale.
- Hadawi, S. (1970). Village Statistics of 1945: A Classification of Land and Area ownership in Palestine. Palestine Liberation Organization Research Center. Archived from the original on 2018-12-08.
- Hartmann, M. (1883). "Die Ortschaftenliste des Liwa Jerusalem in dem türkischen Staatskalender für Syrien auf das Jahr 1288 der Flucht (1871)". Zeitschrift des Deutschen Palästina-Vereins. 6: 102–149.
- Mills, E., ed. (1932). Census of Palestine 1931. Population of Villages, Towns and Administrative Areas. Jerusalem: Government of Palestine.
- Palmer, E.H. (1881). The Survey of Western Palestine: Arabic and English Name Lists Collected During the Survey by Lieutenants Conder and Kitchener, R. E. Transliterated and Explained by E.H. Palmer. Committee of the Palestine Exploration Fund.
- Poloner, John (1894). John Poloner's description of the Holy Land (ca. A.D. 1421). Palestine Pilgrims' Text Society.
- Pringle, D. (1993). The Churches of the Crusader Kingdom of Jerusalem: A-K (excluding Acre and Jerusalem). Vol. I. Cambridge University Press. ISBN 0-521-39036-2.
- Robinson, E.; Smith, E (1841). Biblical Researches in Palestine, Mount Sinai and Arabia Petraea: A Journal of Travels in the year 1838. Vol. 2. Boston: Crocker & Brewster.
- Robinson, E.; Smith, E. (1841). Biblical Researches in Palestine, Mount Sinai and Arabia Petraea: A Journal of Travels in the year 1838. Vol. 3. Boston: Crocker & Brewster.
- Röhricht, R. (1893). (RRH) Regesta regni Hierosolymitani (MXCVII-MCCXCI) (in Latin). Berlin: Libraria Academica Wageriana.
- Schick, C. (1896). "Zur Einwohnerzahl des Bezirks Jerusalem". Zeitschrift des Deutschen Palästina-Vereins. 19: 120–127.
- Socin, A. (1879). "Alphabetisches Verzeichniss von Ortschaften des Paschalik Jerusalem". Zeitschrift des Deutschen Palästina-Vereins. 2: 135–163.
