= Islam in Palestine =

Sunni Islam is a major religion in Palestine, being the religion of the majority of the Palestinian population. Muslims comprise 85% of the population of the West Bank, when including Israeli settlers, and 99% of the population of the Gaza Strip. The largest denomination among Palestinian Muslims are Sunnis, comprising 85% of the total Muslim population.

During the 7th century, the Arab Rashiduns conquered the Levant, succeeded by subsequent Arabic-speaking Muslim dynasties like the Umayyads, Abbasids and the Fatimids, marking the onset of Arabization and Islamization in the region. This process involved both resettlement by nomadic tribes and individual conversions. In the case of the Samaritans, there are records of mass conversion due to economic pressure, political instability and religious persecution in the Abbasid period. Sedentarization facilitated a more rapid Islamization compared to the slower pace of individual conversions among the local populace. Sufi activities and changes in social structures and the weakening of local Christian authorities under Islamic rule also played significant roles.

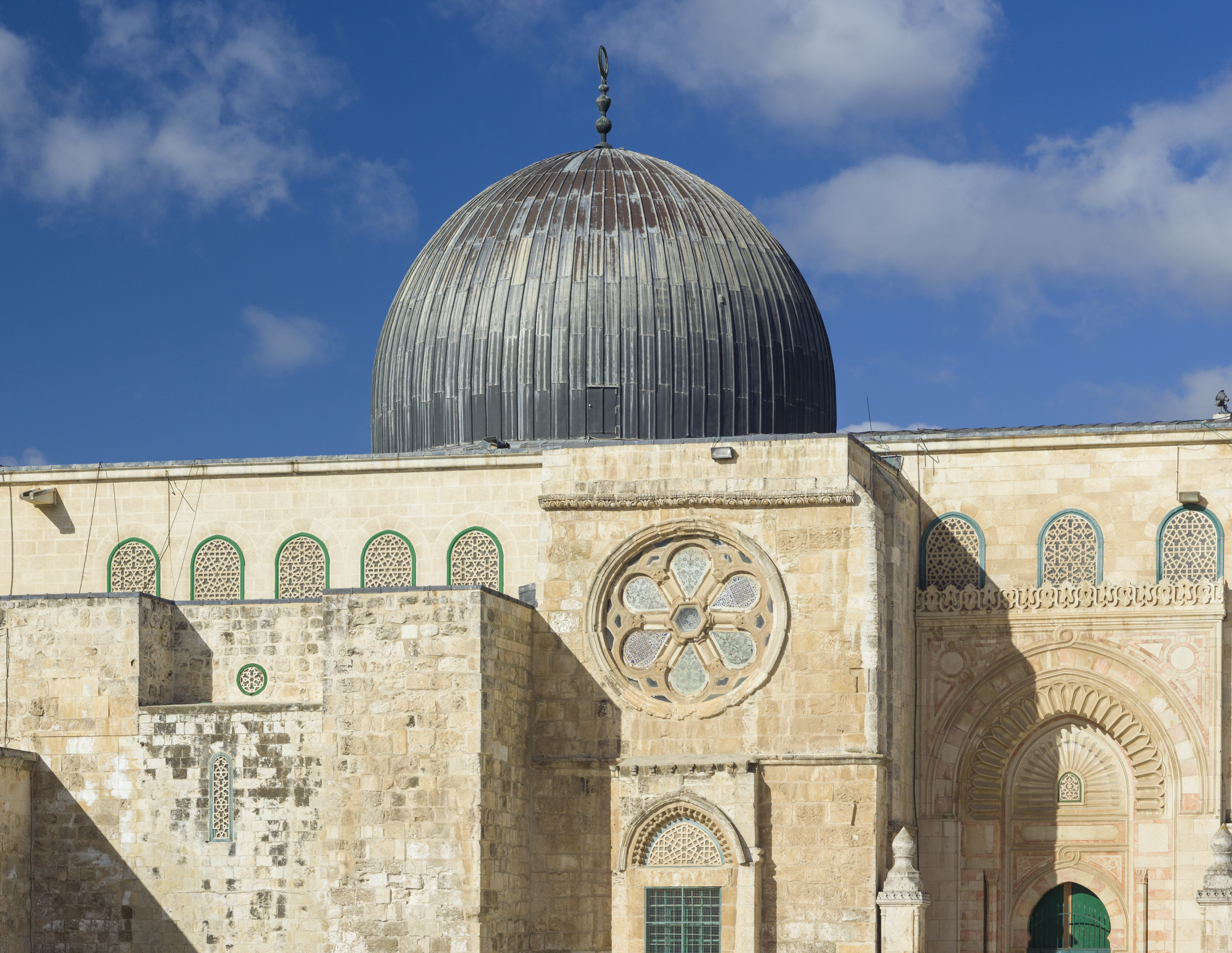
Al-Aqsa Mosque, in East Jerusalem. (Note: Under international law, East Jerusalem is considered a part of the West Bank and, therefore, of the Palestinian territories.)

Some scholars suggest that by the arrival of the Crusaders, Palestine was already overwhelmingly Muslim, while others claim that it was only after the Crusades that Christianity lost its majority, and that the process of mass Islamization took place much later, perhaps during the Mamluk period.

== History ==
=== Early Islamization ===
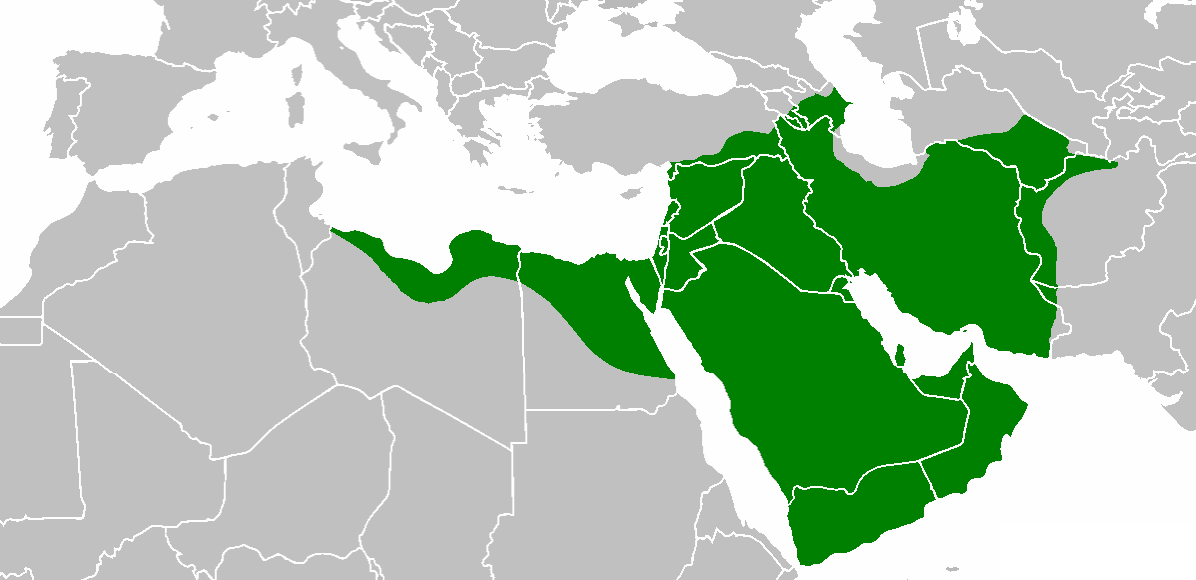
ʿUmar ibn al-Khattāb's empire at its peak, 644

Islam was first brought to the region of Palestine during the Early Muslim conquests of the 7th century, when the Rashidun Caliphate under the leadership of ʿUmar ibn al-Khattāb conquered the Shaam (Note: Ash-Shām (Arabic: اَلـشَّـام) is a region that is bordered by the Taurus Mountains of Anatolia in the north, the Mediterranean Sea in the west, the Arabian Desert in the south, and Mesopotamia in the east. It includes the modern countries of Syria and Lebanon, and the land of Palestine.) region from the Byzantine Empire.

The Muslim army conquered Jerusalem, held by the Byzantine Romans, in November, 636. For four months the siege continued. Ultimately, the Orthodox Patriarch of Jerusalem, Sophronius, agreed to surrender Jerusalem to Caliph Umar in person. Caliph Umar, then at Medina, agreed to these terms and traveled to Jerusalem to sign the capitulation in the spring of 637. Sophronius also negotiated a pact with Caliph Umar, known as the Umariyya Covenant or Covenant of Omar, allowing for religious freedom for Christians in exchange for jizyah (Arabic: جِـزْيَـة), a tax to be paid by conquered non-Muslims, called "dhimmis." Under Muslim Rule, the Christian and Jewish population of Jerusalem in this period enjoyed the usual tolerance given to non-Muslim monotheists.

Having accepted the surrender, Caliph Umar then entered Jerusalem with Sophronius "and courteously discoursed with the patriarch concerning its religious antiquities". When the hour for his prayer came, Umar was in the Anastasis, but refused to pray there, lest in the future the Muslims should use that as an excuse to break the treaty and confiscate the church. The Mosque of Omar, opposite the doors of the Anastasis, with the tall minaret, is known as the place to which he retired for his prayer.

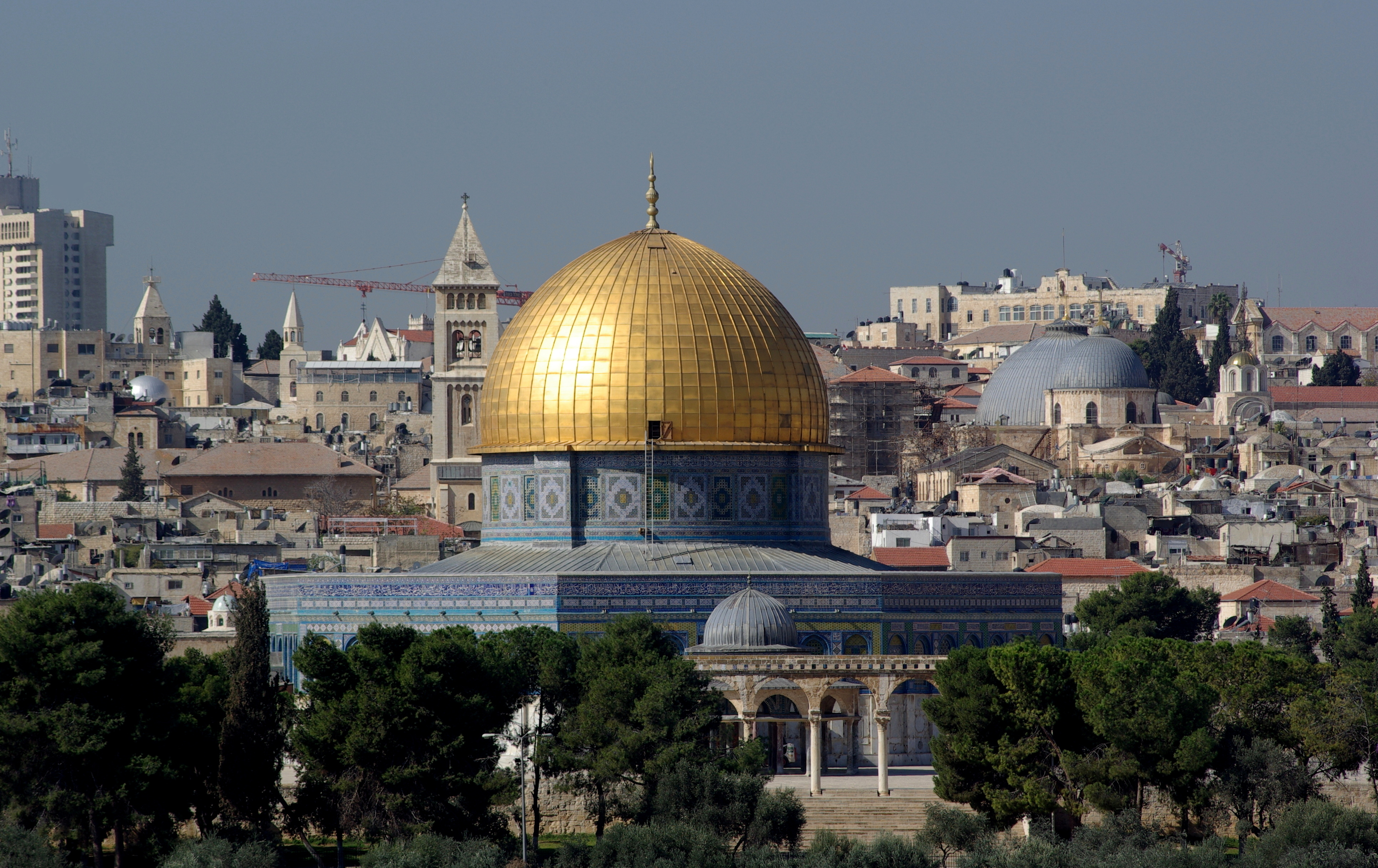
The Dome of the Rock on the Temple Mount, Jerusalem

Jerusalem is Islam's third holiest city after Mecca and Medina in Saudi Arabia. Although the Qur'an does not clarify from where exactly Muhammad ascended to Heaven, the Al-Aqsa (Temple Mount) of Jerusalem is believed by Muslims to be the location. According to the tradition, during a single night around the year 621 CE, the Islamic prophet Muhammad was carried by his mythological steed "al-Burāq" from Mecca to the Temple Mount in Jerusalem. According to the tradition, from there he ascended to heaven where he spoke with Allah. This widely accepted Islamic belief is a source of the religious and spiritual importance of the Dome of the Rock and the adjacent al-Aqsa Mosque.

According to the historian James Parkes, during the first century after the Muslim conquest (640–740), the caliph and governors of Syria and the Holy Land ruled entirely over Christian and Jewish subjects. He further states that apart from the Bedouin in the earliest days, the only Arabs west of the Jordan were the garrisons.

Bishop Arculf, whose account of his pilgrimage to the Holy Land in the 7th century, De Locis Sanctis, written down by the monk Adamnan, described reasonably pleasant living conditions of Christians in Palestine in the first period of Muslim rule. The caliphs of Damascus (661–750) were tolerant princes who were on generally good terms with their Christian subjects. Many Christians (e.g., St. John Damascene) held important offices at their court. The Abbasid caliphs at Baghdad (753–1242), as long as they ruled Syria, were also tolerant of the Christians. Harun Abu-Ja-'afar, (786–809) sent the keys of the Holy Sepulchre to Charlemagne, who built a hospice for Latin pilgrims near the shrine.

=== Islamization under Abbasids and Fatimids ===
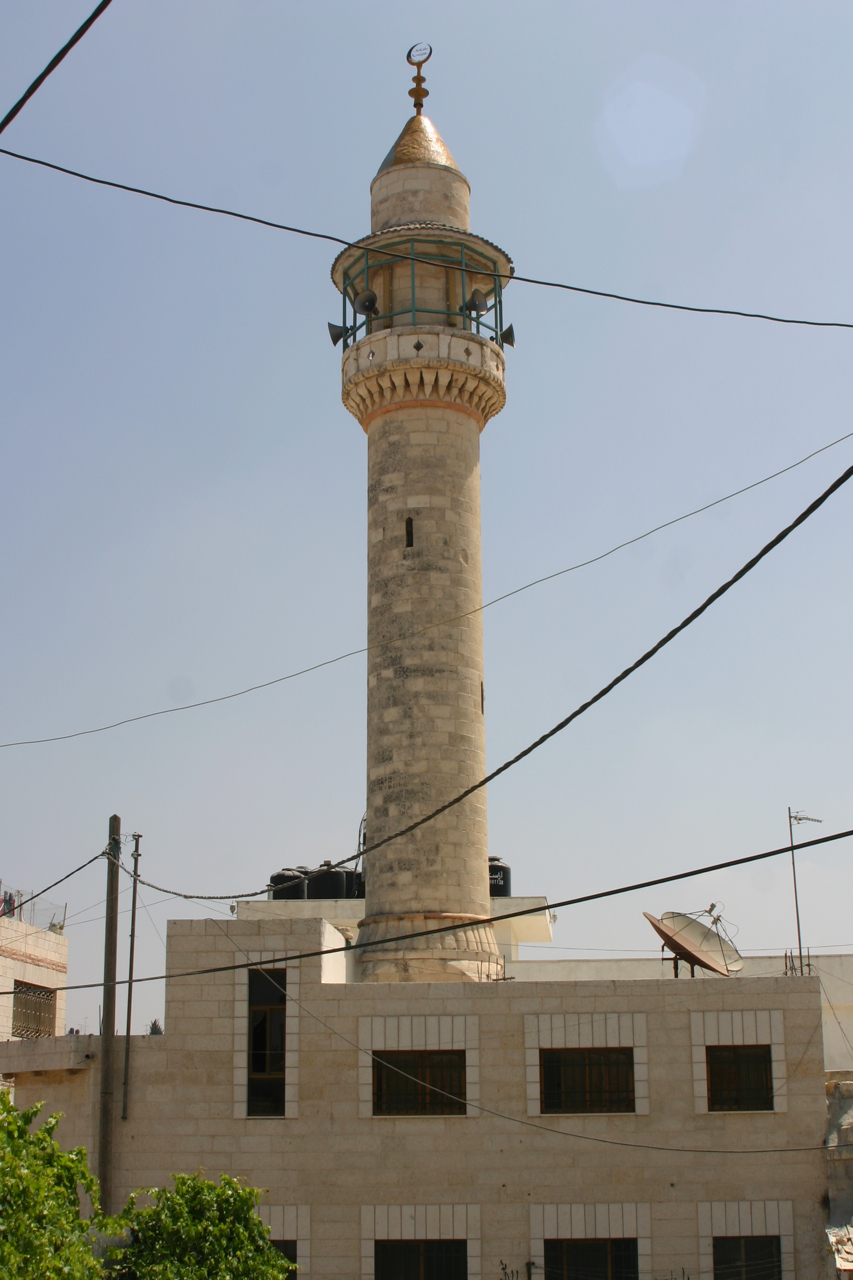
Mosque in Ramallah

Some scholars believe that Islam became the majority religion in Palestine in the 9th century, with acculturation of the locals into Arab identity and when Arabic became the lingua franca. In the Middle East and North Africa in general and Palestine in particular, indigenous peoples in various regions who until then spoke mostly Aramaic, Coptic and Berber languages, began adopting Arabic due to its significance as a liturgical language of the Quran. The shift took place with an extended period of bilingualism, which lasted until the 12th century in Palestine and as late as the 17th century in Egypt.

Rival dynasties and revolutions led to the eventual disunion of the Muslim world. During the 9th century, Palestine was conquered by the Fatimid dynasty, centered in Egypt. During that time the region of Palestine became again the center of violent disputes followed by wars, since enemies of the Fatimid dynasty attempted to conquer the region. At that time, the Byzantine Empire continued trying to recapture the territories they previously lost to the Muslims, including Jerusalem.

During the Fatimid era, the cities of Jerusalem and Hebron became prime destinations for Sufi wayfarers. The creation of locally rooted Sufi-inspired communities and institutions between 1000 and 1250 were part and parcel of the conversion to Islam.

The sixth Fatimid caliph, Caliph Al-Hakim (996–1021), who was believed to be "God made manifest" by the Druze, destroyed the Holy Sepulchre in 1009. This powerful provocation started the near 90-year preparation towards the First Crusade.

The Samaritan community dropped in numbers during the various periods of Muslim rule in the region. The Samaritans could not rely on foreign assistance as much as the Christians did, nor on a large number of diaspora immigrants as did the Jews. The once-flourishing community declined over time, either through emigration or conversion to Islam among those who remained. According to Milka Levy-Rubin, many Samaritans converted under Abbasid and Tulunid rule.

=== Early Crusades ===
In 1099, the Christian Crusaders, with the support of the Roman Catholic Church, launched the First Crusade campaign with the aims of regaining control of Jerusalem from the Fatimid Caliphate, and helping the Byzantine Empire fight the Seljuk Turks. During the campaign, the Crusaders launched an assault on the city of Jerusalem, captured it in July 1099, massacred many of the city's Muslim and Jewish inhabitants, and established the first Christian Kingdom of Jerusalem. The Crusaders transformed the Dome of the Rock into the "Shrine of the Lord" (Templum Domini) and the Al-Aqsa mosque into the "Hall of Solomon" (Templum Solomonis). For the local Muslim population, the reaction to the events was to try to find an accommodation with the Crusaders, whereas the larger Muslim world typically looked upon the events with indifference.

=== Ayyubid rule and Late Crusades ===
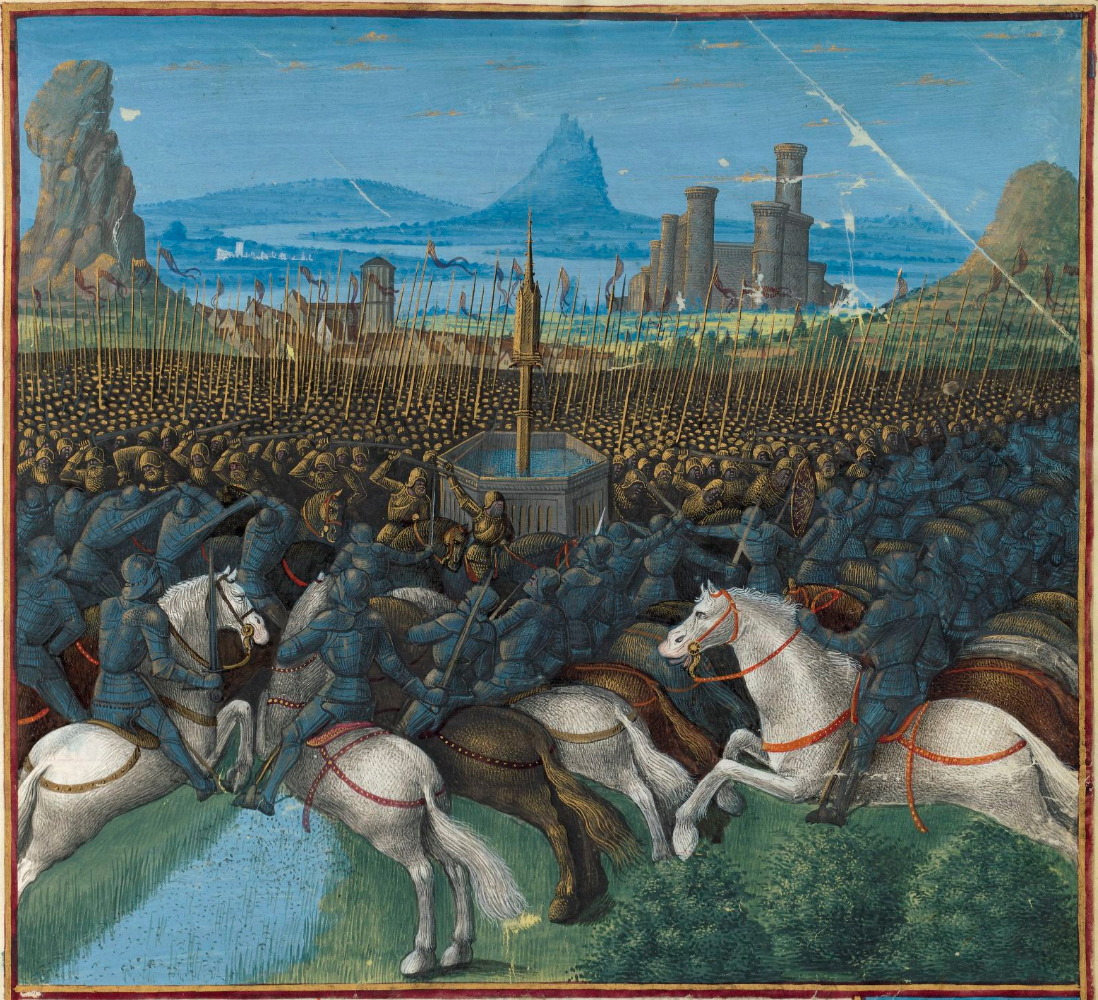
Illustration of the Battle of Hattin from a copy of the Passages d'outremer, c.1490

In 1187, the Ayyubid Sultan Salah ad-Din captured the region after defeating the Crusader states in the Battle of Hattin. As a direct result of the battle, Islamic forces once again became the dominant power in the region, re-conquering Jerusalem and several other Crusader-held cities. In 1189, the first lodge for Sufi ascetics was established at the Al-Khanqah al-Salahiyya Mosque in Jerusalem, which had been a palace of the Latin Patriarch prior to the reconquest of the city.

The Christian defeat led to a Third Crusade aimed to regain the lost territories in the Holy Land. Richard I of England launched a siege upon the city of Acre after which he conquered the city and killed 3,000 Muslims. After a second victory won in the Battle of Arsuf, the Crusaders arrived to Jerusalem, but withdrew without trying to conquer the city. Following another military clash in Jaffa, which wasn't won by either side, Saladin and Richard the Lionheart signed the Treaty of Ramla in June 1192. Under the terms of the agreement, Jerusalem would remain under Muslim control but the city would be open to Christian pilgrims. The treaty reduced the Latin Kingdom to a strip along the coast from Tyre to Jaffa.

=== Mamluk domination ===
In 1250, the Ayyubid Egyptian dynasty was overthrown by slave ("Mamluk") regiments, and a new dynasty - the Mamluks - was born. On September 3, 1260, at the Battle of Ain Jalut held in the Jezreel Valley, the Muslim Egyptian Mamluks under Baibars defeated the Mongols and stopped their advance. His successor Al-Ashraf Khalil completed the victory by sweeping the last of the Crusaders out of Palestine.

In 1291, the forces of the Mamluk Sultan of Egypt al-Ashraf Khalil forced a long siege upon the city of Acre, which was the final Christian landhold in the Holy Land. The Mamluks captured the city on May 18, 1291, killing most of the Christian local inhabitants, thus ending the second Crusader Kingdom of Jerusalem.

The Mamluks were to rule Palestine for the following two centuries (1291–1516). The Muslim population became the majority, and many Muslim shrines were built such as Maqam al-Nabi Yamin, Maqam al-Nabi Musa, Maqam al-Nabi Rubin and many more shrines that Muslims described as a burial sites of Prophets, Sahabas and even what they considered holy Muslim martyrs from Crusader and pre-Crusader times. Some historians say that the shrines were built to make a good strategic positions for Muslims (for example Nabi Musa was built on the road from Jerusalem to Jericho).

The Mamluks, ruling from Damascus, brought some prosperity to the area, particularly to Jerusalem, with an extensive programme involving the building of schools, hospices for pilgrims, the construction of Islamic colleges and the renovation of mosques. Mujir al-Din's extensive writing about 15th century Jerusalem documents the consolidation and expansion of Islamic sites in the Mamluk era.

The ascendency of the Burji over the Bahri Mamluks, together with recurrent droughts, plagues and pestilence like the Black Death and taxation to cover the costs of wars against Crusaders and Mongols (the last of which was "Tamurlane's horde") brought about both growing insecurity and economic decline. By the end of their reign, with the decay of internal control and massive population losses due to plagues, Bedouins moved in to take advantage of the decline in defenses, and farmers abandoned their lands. They sacked Ramla in 1481 and annihilated a Mamluk army that had been raised in Gaza to repel them. By the end of the 15th century, Jerusalem's population amounted to approximately 10,000, mostly Muslims, with roughly 1,000 Christians and 400 Jews.

=== Rise of the Ottomans ===
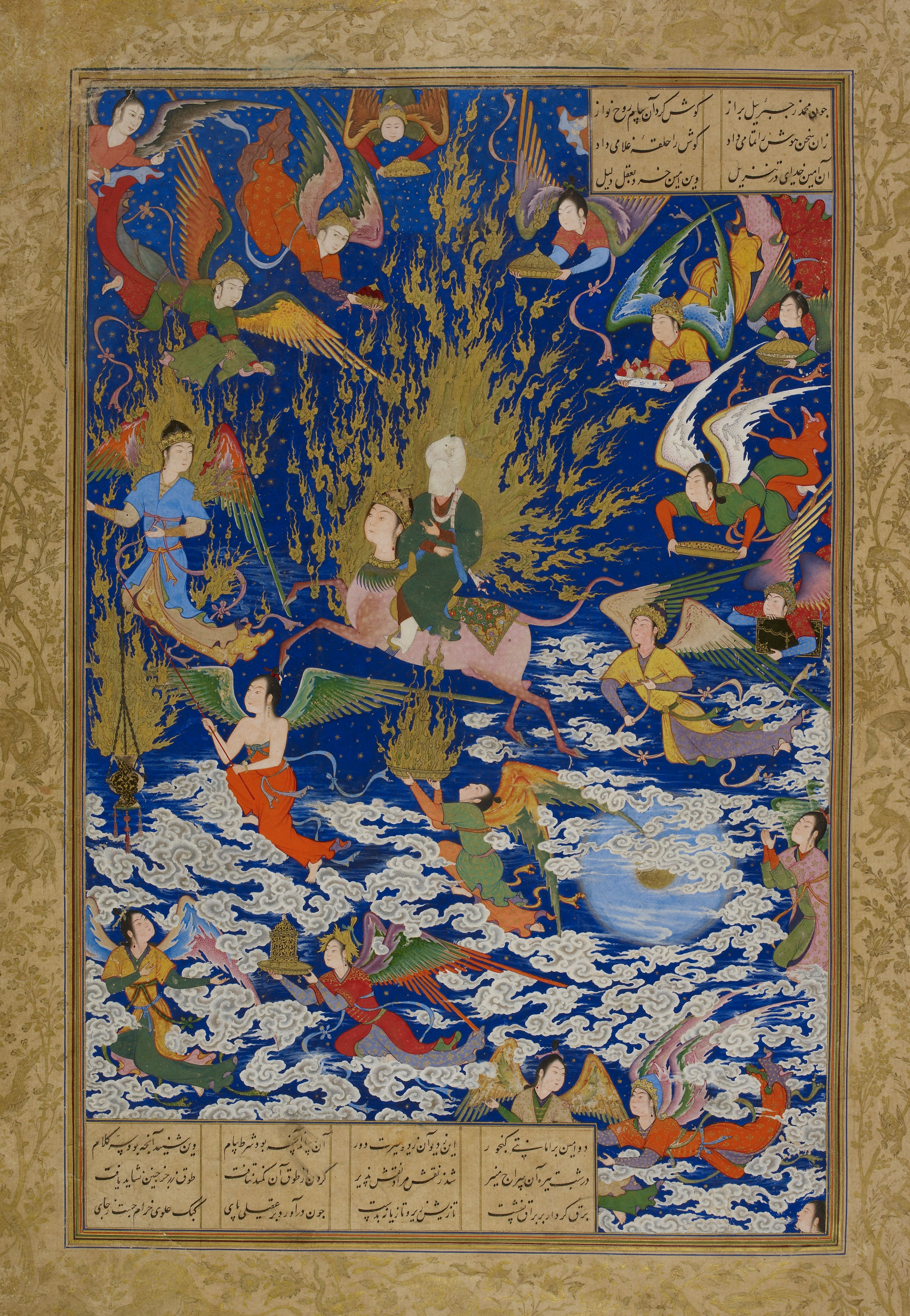
A 16th century Persian miniature painting celebrating Muhammad's ascent into the Heavens

On August 24, 1516, at the Battle of Marj Dabiq, the Ottoman Empire forces defeated the Mamluk sultanate forces and thus the Ottomans became the new rulers of the Levant. On October 28, they defeated the Mamluk forces once more in the Battle of Yaunis Khan and they annexed the region of Palestine. By December of that year the entire region of Palestine was conquered by the Ottoman Empire. As a result of the Ottoman advance during the reign of Selim I, the Sunni Ottoman Turks occupied the historic region of Palestine. Their leadership reinforced and ensured the centrality and importance of Islam as the dominant religion in the region. Swamps with the risk of malaria made it difficult to settle and farm on the coastal plains and in the valleys throughout most of the Ottoman era.

In 1834, a popular uprising erupted against the rule of Wāli Muhammad Ali. The main cause of the uprising was indignation at being drafted by the Egyptian army. At first the rebels managed to take over many cities, including Nablus, Jerusalem and Hebron. In response, Egyptian military leader Ibrahim Pasha commanded an army force of 40,000 people against the rebels and managed to put an end to the rebellion, conquering Gaza, Ramleh, Jaffa, Haifa, Jerusalem and Acre. Ibrahim Pasha, in wresting control of Palestine from the Ottoman Empire, clashed with the regional ambitions of the European Great Powers and, in order to assuage their unease, he reversed Ottoman policy and opened the country up to both foreigners and non-Muslim populations. Despite the brevity of Egyptian overlordship, since the great powers restored the fortunes of the Ottomans and their sovereignty over Palestine, the long-term effect was to lay the groundwork for the development of extensive European activities and interests in Palestine.

In 1860, the Mosque of Omar was built in the Christian city of Bethlehem. It is the only mosque in Bethlehem's old city.

=== Islam during British rule ===
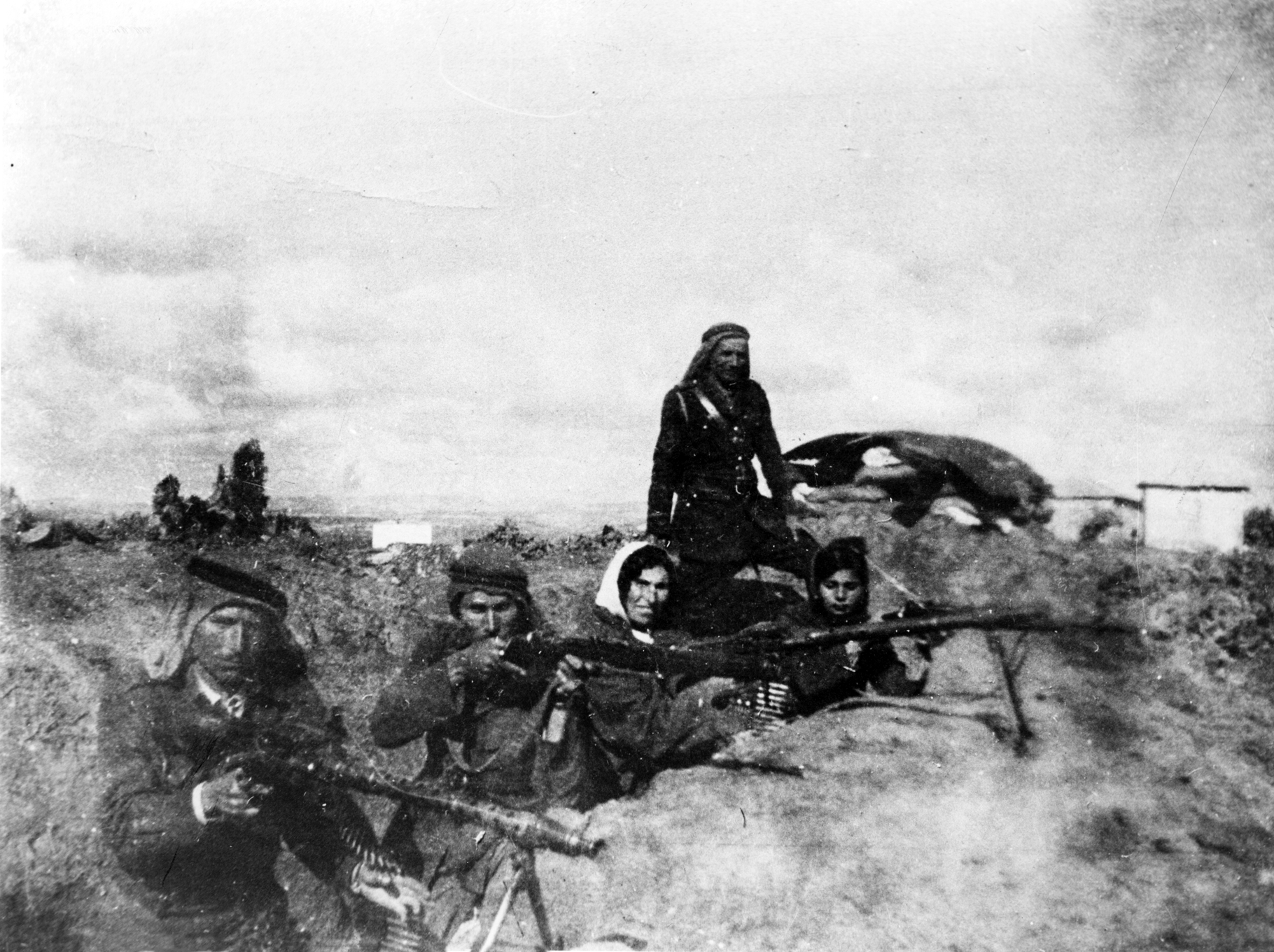
Irregulars during the 1936–39 Arab revolt

In 1917, at the end of the First World War, the British Empire conquered the region of Palestine from the Ottoman Empire. The United Kingdom was granted control of Palestine by the Versailles Peace Conference which established the League of Nations in 1919 and appointed Herbert Samuel, a former Postmaster General in the British cabinet, who was instrumental in drafting the Balfour Declaration, as its first High Commissioner in Palestine. The British occupation of the region brought an end to hundreds of years of successive Muslim rule in the region of Palestine.

The gradual increase in the number of Jews in Palestine led to the development of a proto-Arab-Palestinian national movement, influenced and inspired by Muslim leader and Mufti of Jerusalem Haj Amin al-Husseini. Zionism, the ideology advocating the creation of a Jewish state in Palestine, was increasingly identified as a threat by the Muslim-Arab population in Palestine. This anti-Zionist trend became linked to a fierce anti-British resistance (like in the 1920 Palestine riots and during the 1936–39 Arab Revolt).

The High Commissioner of Palestine, Herbert Samuel, issued an order in December 1921 establishing a Supreme Muslim Council with authority over all the Muslim waqfs and sharia courts in Palestine. In addition, in 1922 the British authorities appointed Haj Amin al-Husseini as the Mufti of Jerusalem. Until the 1936–39 Arab revolt in Palestine took place, the Council operated as the Governing body of the Arab community under the British Mandate, and co-operated with the British government in Palestine. All along its operation, the Supreme Muslim Council advocated an active resistance against the Jewish "Yishuv", supporting the Arab underground anti-British movements in the country.

=== 1948–1967: Islam under Israeli, Jordanian and Egyptian rule ===
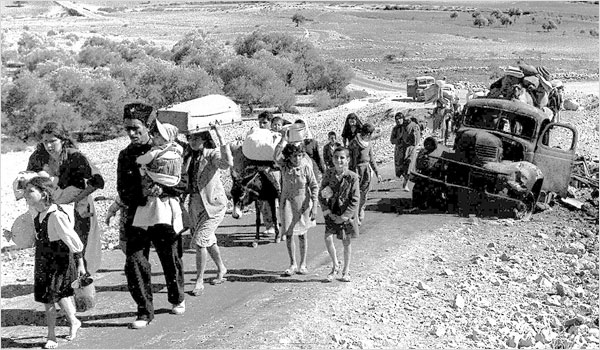
Palestinian refugees from Galilee in 1948

On May 14, 1948, one day before the end of the British Mandate of Palestine, the leaders of the Jewish community in Palestine led by prime minister David Ben-Gurion, made a declaration of independence, and the state of Israel was established. Contingents of Egyptian, Syrian, Jordanian, and Iraqi armies invaded Israel, thus starting the 1948 Arab–Israeli War. The nascent Israeli Defense Force repulsed the Arab nations from part of the occupied territories, thus extending its borders beyond the original UNSCOP partition. By December 1948, Israel controlled most of the portion of Mandate Palestine west of the Jordan River. The remainder of the Mandate consisted of Jordan, the area that came to be called the West Bank (occupied by Jordan), and the Gaza Strip (occupied by Egypt). Prior to and during this conflict, 700,000 Palestinian Arabs fled their original lands to become Palestinian refugees, in part, due to a promise from Arab leaders that they would be able to return when the war is won.

The British transferred the symbolic Islamic governance of the land to the Hashemites based in Jordan, and not to the House of Saud. The Hashemites thus became the official guardians of the Islamic holy places of Jerusalem and the areas around it. Following the Jordanian rule of the West Bank during the war, King Abdullah I of Jordan removed Amin al-Husayni as Grand Mufti and appointed Sheikh Hussam ad-Din Jarallah as the new Grand Mufti of Jerusalem on 20 December 1948. The Supreme Muslim Council was eventually disbanded in 1951 by the Jordanian authorities. On July 20, 1951 king Abdullah of Jordan was assassinated while visiting the Al Aqsa Mosque. The assassination was carried out by a Palestinian from the Husseini clan. The Palestinian gunman, motivated by fears that king Abdullah would make a separate peace with Israel, fired three fatal bullets into the King's head and chest.

After the conquest of the Temple Mount during the Six-Day War, the Chief Israeli Rabbinate announced that Jewish people are forbidden of entering the Temple Mount. Since 1967, Israel controls the security on the Temple Mount, but the Muslim Waqf controls administrative matters, taking responsibility for the conduct of Islamic affairs just as it did during the Jordanian rule.

== Views ==
Ellenblum posits that Islamization stemmed from both nomadic resettlement and individual conversions. Levtzion, Vryonis and Avni emphasize the role of sedentarization, noting its facilitation of rapid Islamization compared to the slower pace of individual conversions among the local populace. Additionally, scholars like Michael Erlich highlight the impact of changes in social structures and the weakening of Christian authorities due to deurbanization under Islamic rule on the Islamization process. One possible exception is the mass conversion of Samaritans to Islam.

According to Erlich, Palestine's Islamization was mainly a result of urbanization and de-urbanization processes in Palestine under Muslim rule. During the Byzantine period, Palestine boasted more than thirty cities, or settlements with a bishop's see. Most of these cities declined under Muslim rule, and eventually disappeared; some of these became villages or townships, others were completely destroyed. This resulted in many cases in a weakening or complete disappearance of the local ecclesiastical administration. Over time, most of the local population converted to Islam. During this period, only Nablus and Jerusalem maintained their urban status, which is why, according to Erlich, religious minorities (Samaritans, Jews and Christians, respectively) survived there.

== Demographics ==
=== Islam ===
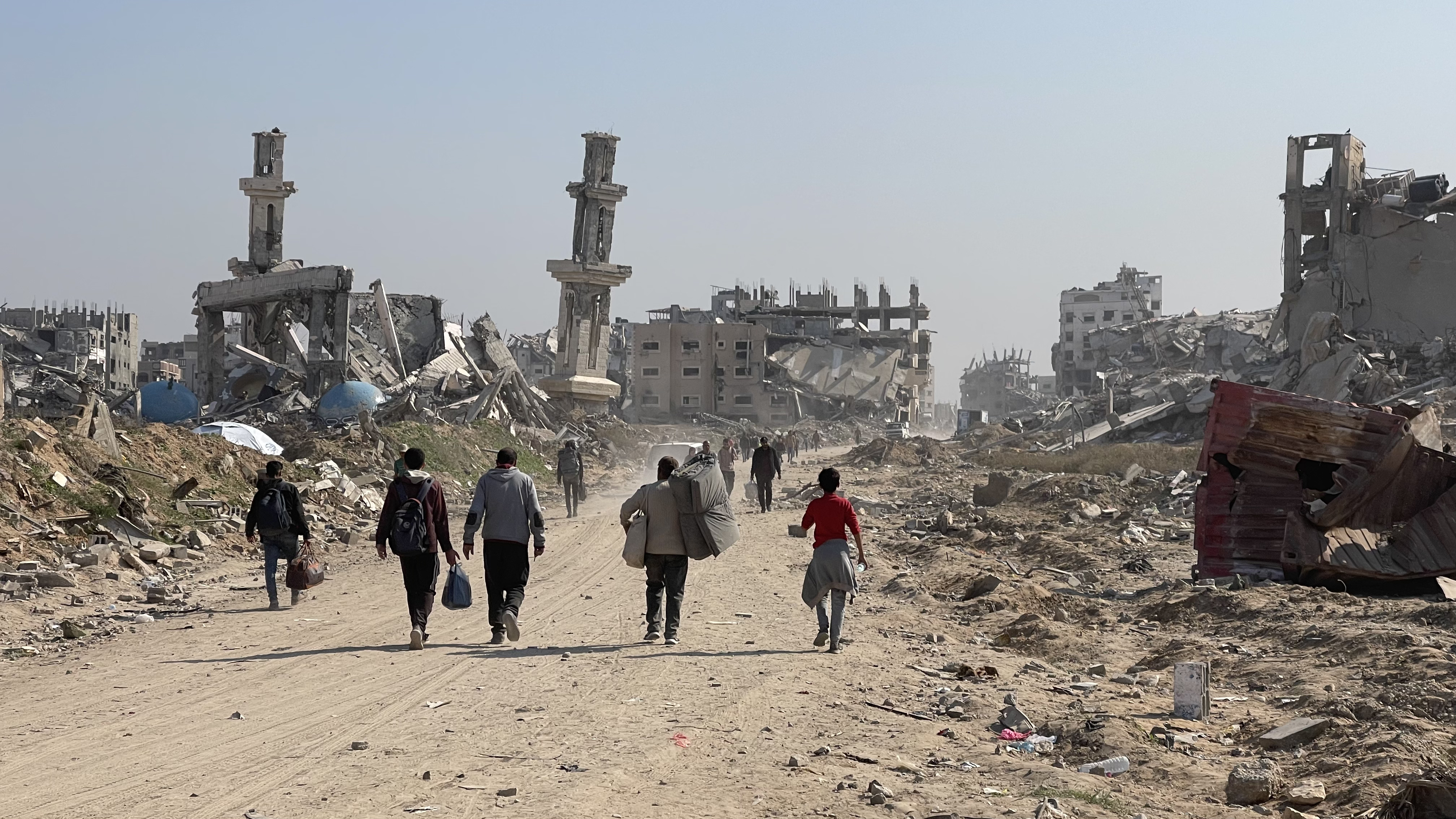
Destroyed mosque in Gaza in 2023

Today, Islam is a prominent religion in both Gaza and the West Bank. Most of the population in the State of Palestine are Muslims (85% in the West Bank and 99% in the Gaza Strip).

=== Sunni Islam ===
Sunnis constitute 85% of Palestinian Muslims, of which the predominant madhab is Hanafi, which is one of the four schools of Islamic law in Sunni Islam. Salafism took root in Gaza in the 1970s, when Palestinian students returned from studying abroad at religious schools in Saudi Arabia. A number of Salafi groups in Gaza continue to receive support and funding from Riyadh.

=== Shia Islam ===
From 1923 to 1948, there were seven villages in Mandatory Palestine in which the population was predominantly Shia Muslim (also known as Metawali): Tarbikha, Saliha, Malkiyeh, Nabi Yusha, Qadas, Hunin, and Abil al-Qamh. These villages were transferred from the French to the British sphere as a result of the border agreement of 1923. All of them were depopulated during the 1948 Arab–Israeli War, most of them went into Lebanon and their former locations are now in northern Israel. The 1931 census counted 4,100 Metawalis in Palestine.

Since 1979, due to Iran's influence, some Palestinian Sunnis have converted to Shia Islam. Israeli Haaretz reported in 2012 that Hamas's fear of growing Iranian influence in Gaza caused the organization to crack down on Shiite organizations, including charities. Nevertheless, becoming Shiite is a growing trend in the Gaza Strip. Hundreds of Sunnis, both Islamic Jihad activists and ordinary people, are known to have converted. The Sabireen Movement was created in 2014 by some Shi’ites that left the Islamic Jihad.

=== Non-denominational Islam ===
According to the Pew Research Center, non-denominational Muslims constitute 15% of the Palestinian Muslim population.

== See also ==
- Muslim conquest of the Levant
- Islam in Israel
- Palestinian nationalism
- Time periods in the Palestine region
- Islamization
- History of Israel
- History of Palestine
- Palestinian Christians
- Spread of Islam
- Muslim conquests
- Islamization of Jerusalem
- Islamization of East Jerusalem under Jordanian rule
- Islamization of the Temple Mount
- Islamization of Gaza
