= History of Palestine =

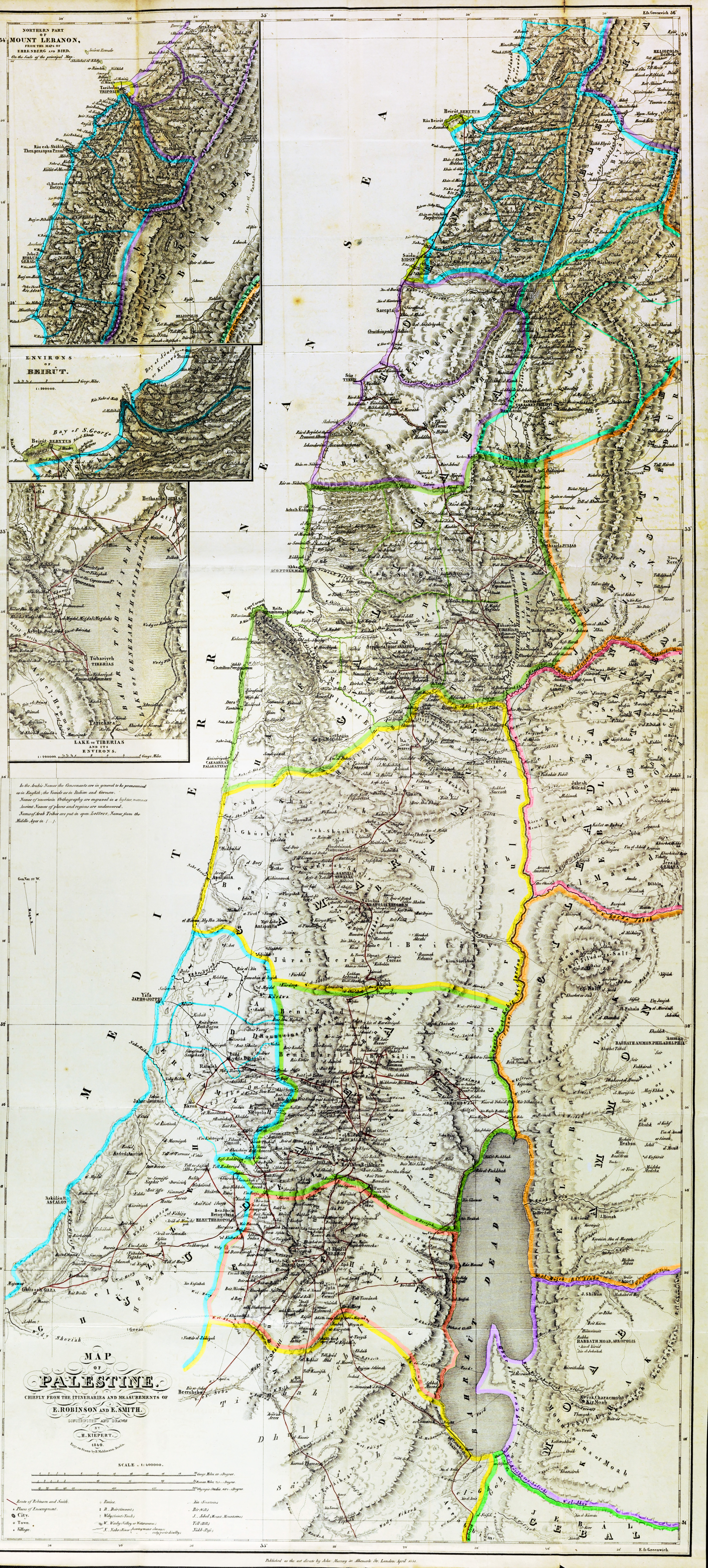
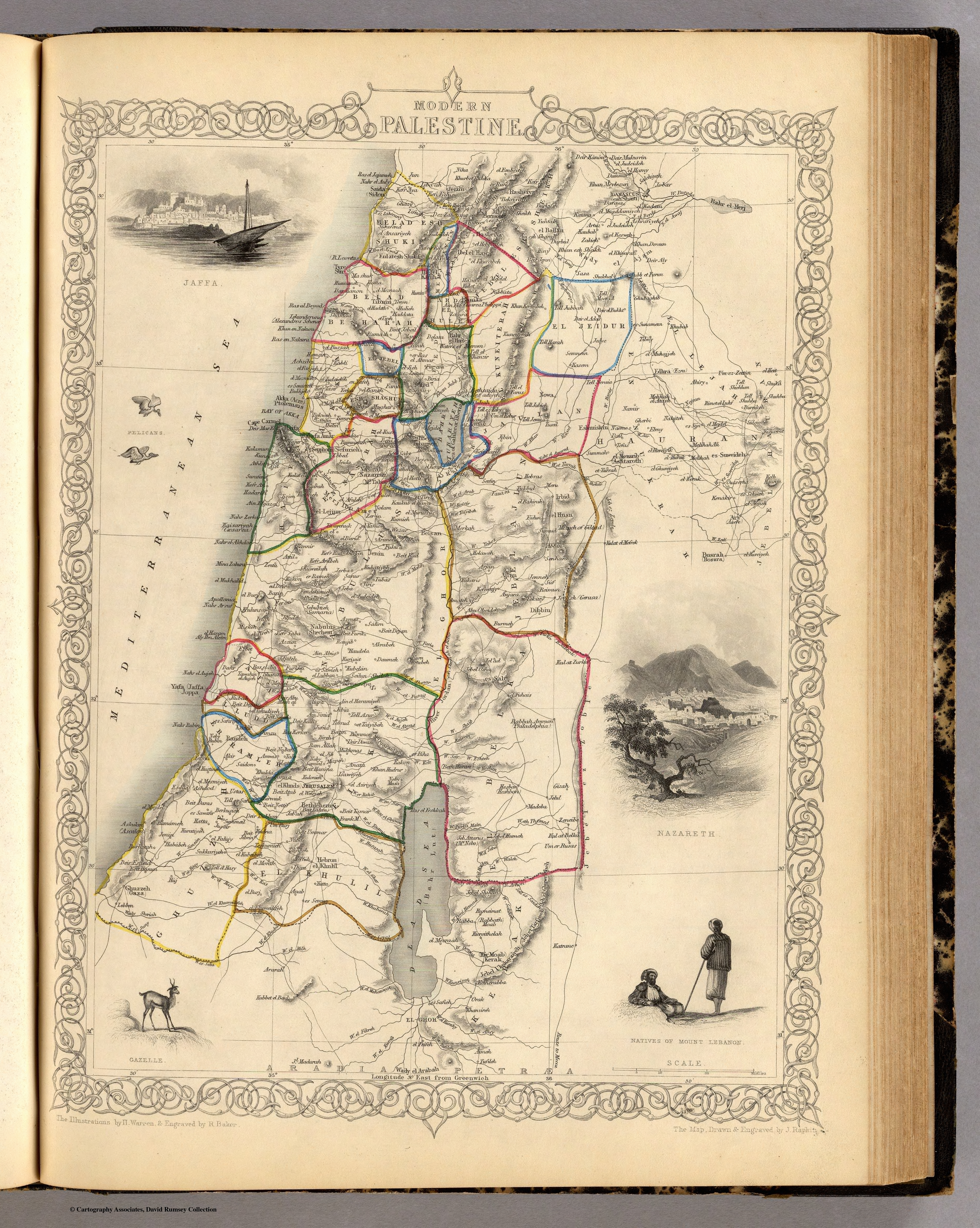
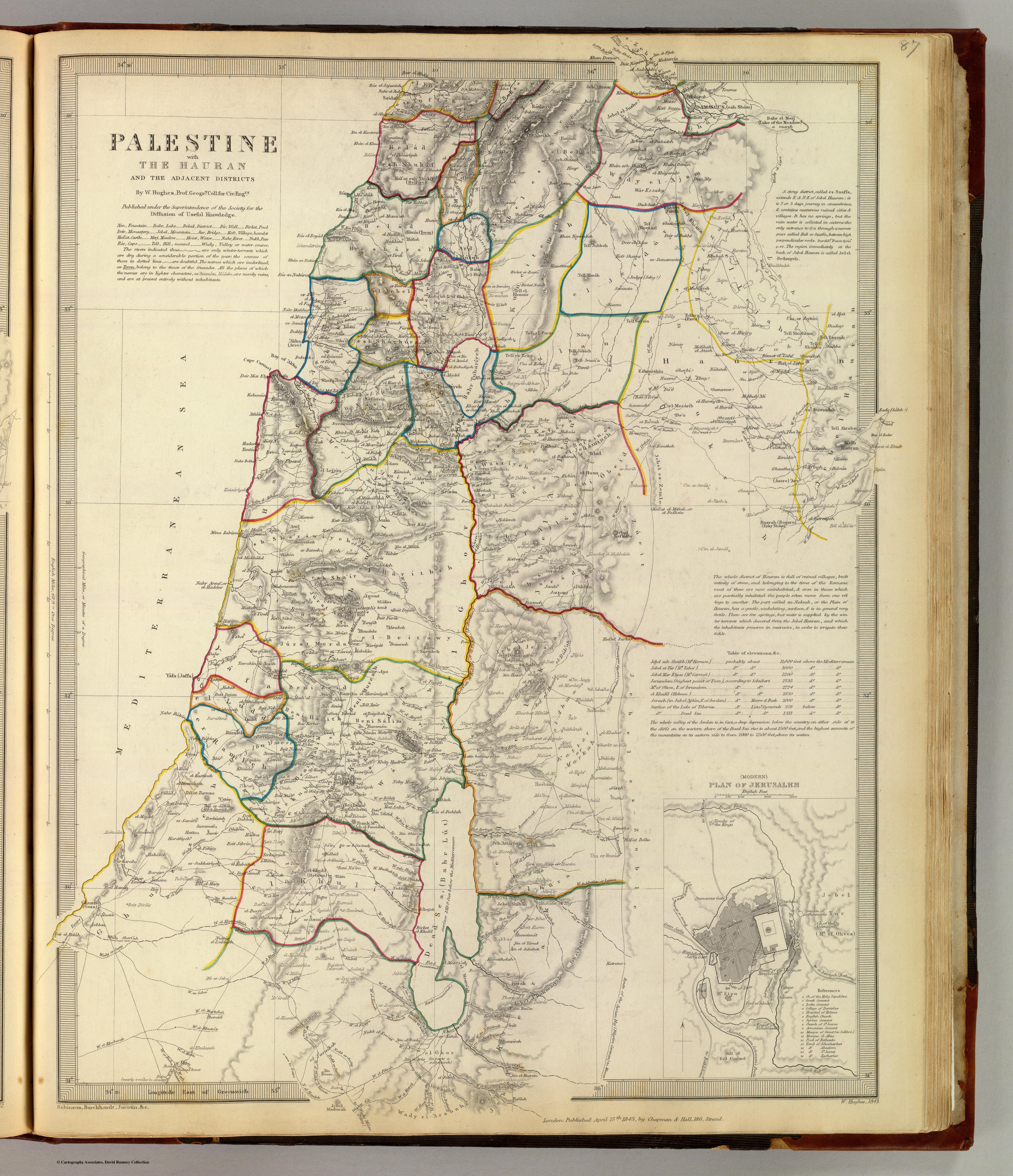
Maps of Ottoman Palestine showing the Kaza subdivisions.

The region of Palestine is part of the Levant, a land bridge between Africa and Eurasia that has traditionally served as the "crossroads of Western Asia, the Eastern Mediterranean, and Northeast Africa". Lying to the west of the Jordan Rift Valley, Palestine is, in tectonic terms, located in the "northwest of the Arabian Plate".

A crossroads for religion, culture, commerce, and politics, Palestine was among the earliest regions to see human habitation, agricultural communities and civilization. In the Bronze Age, the Canaanites established city-states influenced by surrounding civilizations, among them Egypt, which ruled the area in the Late Bronze Age. During the Iron Age, the kingdoms of Israel and Judah, emerged in the interior, while kingdoms belonging to Philistia and Phoenicia ruled the Palestinian coast. The Assyrians conquered the region in the 8th century BCE, then the Babylonians c. 601 BCE, followed by the Persian Achaemenid Empire that conquered the Babylonian Empire in 539 BCE. Alexander the Great conquered the Persian Empire in the late 330s BCE, intensifying Hellenizing influences.

In the late 2nd-century BCE Maccabean Revolt, the Jewish Hasmonean Kingdom conquered most of Palestine; the kingdom subsequently became a vassal of Rome, which annexed it in 63 BCE. Roman Judea was troubled by Jewish revolts in 66 CE, so Rome destroyed Jerusalem and the Second Jewish Temple in 70 CE. In the 4th century, as the Roman Empire adopted Christianity, Palestine became a center for the religion, attracting pilgrims, monks and scholars. Following Muslim conquest of the Levant in 636–641, ruling dynasties succeeded each other: the Rashiduns; Umayyads; Abbasids; the semi-independent Tulunids and Ikhshidids; Fatimids; and the Seljuks. In 1099, the First Crusade resulted in Crusaders establishing of the Kingdom of Jerusalem, which was reconquered by the Ayyubid Sultanate in 1187. Following the invasion of the Mongol Empire in the late 1250s, the Egyptian Mamluks reunified Palestine under its control, before the region was conquered by the Ottoman Empire in 1516, being ruled as Ottoman Syria until the 20th century largely without dispute.

Zionism emerged in as a coherent political project in the late 19th century. In 1917, during World War I, the British government issued the Balfour Declaration, announced its support for the establishment of a homeland for the Jewish people in Palestine, and captured it from the Ottomans. The League of Nations gave Britain mandatory power over Palestine in 1922. British rule and Arab efforts to prevent Jewish migration led to growing violence between Arabs and Jews, causing the British to announce its intention to terminate the Mandate in 1947. The UN General Assembly recommended partitioning Palestine into two states: Arab and Jewish. However, the situation deteriorated into a civil war. The Arabs rejected the Partition Plan; the Jews ostensibly accepted it, declaring the independence of the State of Israel in May 1948 upon the end of the British mandate. Nearby Arab countries invaded Palestine; Israel not only prevailed, but conquered more territory than envisioned by the Partition Plan. During the war, 700,000, or about 80% of all Palestinians fled or were driven out of territory Israel conquered and were not allowed to return, an event known as the Nakba (Arabic for 'catastrophe') to Palestinians. Starting in the late 1940s and continuing for decades, about 850,000 Jews from the Arab world immigrated ("made Aliyah") to Israel.

After the war, only two parts of Palestine remained in Arab control: the West Bank and East Jerusalem were annexed by Jordan, and the Gaza Strip was occupied by Egypt, which were conquered by Israel during the Six-Day War in 1967. Despite international objections, Israel started to establish settlements in these occupied territories. Meanwhile, the Palestinian national movement gained international recognition, thanks to the Palestine Liberation Organisation (PLO), under Yasser Arafat. In 1993, the Oslo Peace Accords between Israel and the PLO established the Palestinian Authority (PA), an interim body to run Gaza and the West Bank (but not East Jerusalem), pending a permanent solution. Further peace developments were not ratified and/or implemented, and relations between Israel and Palestinians has been marked by conflict, especially with Islamist Hamas, which rejects the PA. In 2007, Hamas won control of Gaza from the PA, now limited to the West Bank. In 2012, the State of Palestine (the name used by the PA) became a non-member observer state in the UN, allowing it to take part in General Assembly debates and improving its chances of joining other UN agencies.

== Prehistory ==
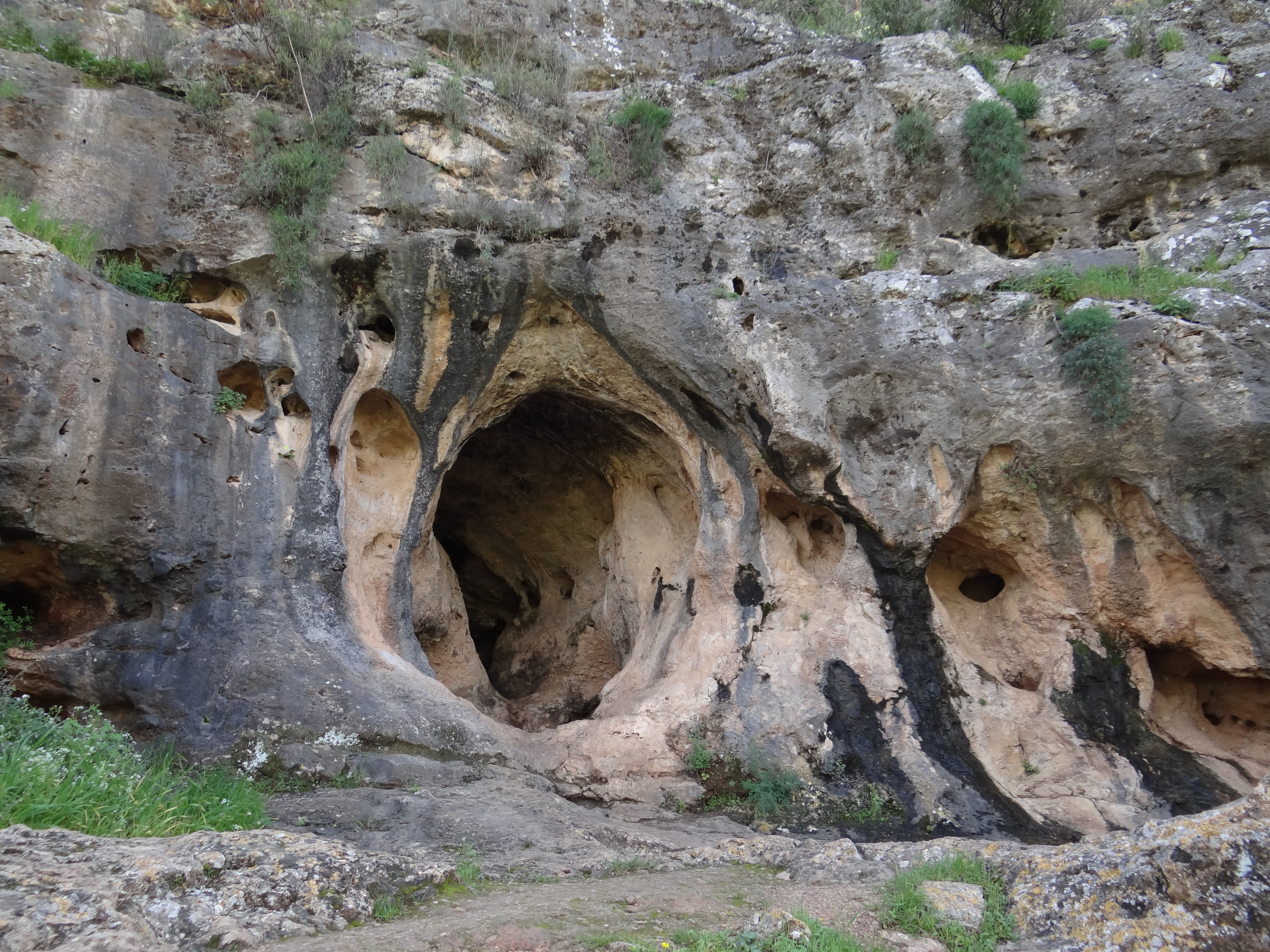
Skhul Cave

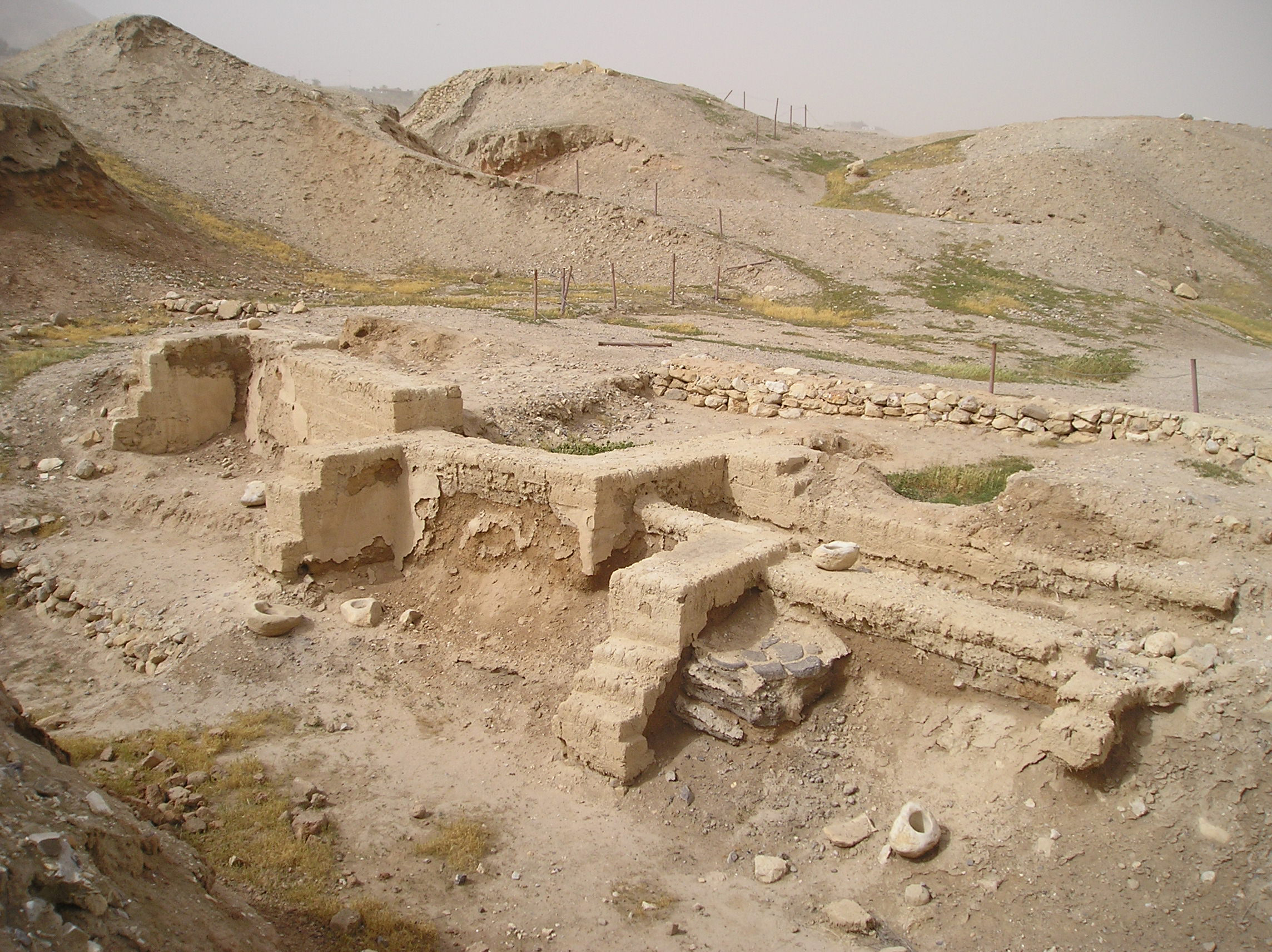
A dwelling unearthed at Tell es-Sultan, Jericho

The earliest human remains in the region were found in Ubeidiya, 3 kilometres (1.9 mi) south of the Sea of Galilee, in the Jordan Rift Valley. They date to the Pleistocene, c. 1.5 million years ago, traces of the earliest migration of Homo erectus out of Africa.

Excavations in Skhul Cave revealed the first evidence of the late Epipalaeolithic Natufian culture, characterized by the presence of abundant microliths, human burials and ground stone tools. This also represents one area where Neanderthals – present in the region between 200,000 and 45,000 years ago – lived alongside modern humans dating to 100,000 years ago. In the caves of Shuqba near Ramallah and Wadi Khareitun near Bethlehem, tools were found and attributed to the Natufian culture (c. 2,800–10,300 BCE). Other remains from this era have been found at Tel Abu Hureura, Ein Mallaha, Beidha and Jericho.

Between 10,000 and 5000 BCE, agricultural communities were established. Evidence of such settlements were found at Tell es-Sultan in Jericho and consisted of a number of walls, a religious shrine, and a 23-foot (7.0 m) tower with an internal staircase Jericho is believed to be one of the oldest continuously inhabited cities in the world, with evidence of settlement dating back to 9000 BCE. Along the Jericho–Dead Sea–Bir es-Saba–Gaza–Sinai route, a culture originating in Syria, marked by the use of copper and stone tools, brought new migrant groups to the region contributing to an increasingly urban fabric.

== Bronze and Iron Ages (3700–539 BCE) ==
=== Emergence of cities ===
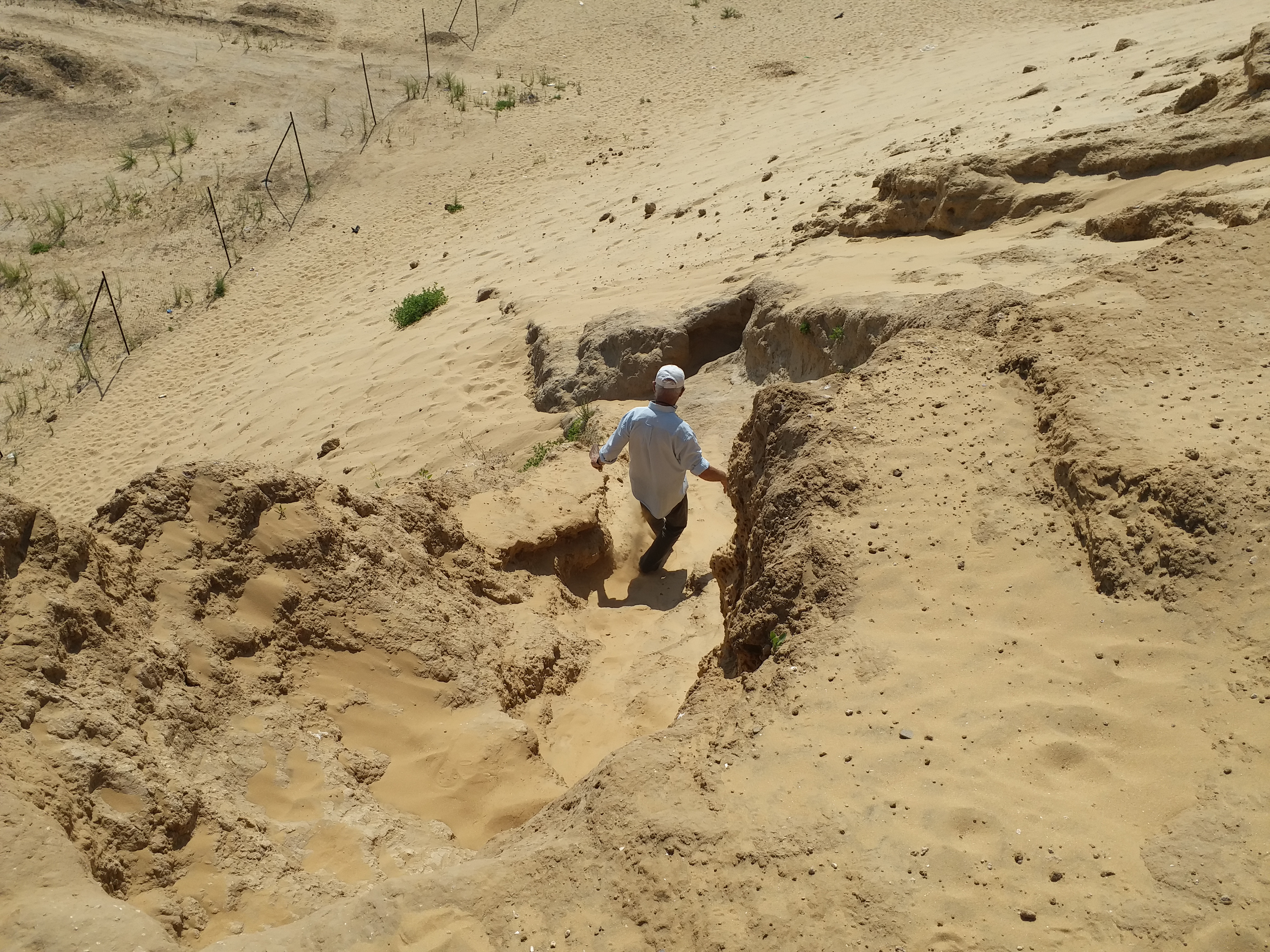
Part of Tell es-Sakan, a Bronze Age site south of Gaza City

In the Early Bronze Age (c. 3700–2500 BCE) period, the earliest formation of urban societies and cultures emerged in the region. The period is defined through archaeology, as it is absent from any historical record either from Palestine or contemporary Egyptian and Mesopotamian sources. It follows the demise of the Ghassulian village-culture of the late Chalcolithic period. It begins in a period of around 600 years of a stable rural society, economically based on a Mediterranean agriculture and with a slow growth in population.

This period has been termed the Early Bronze Age I (c. 3700–3100 BCE), parallel to the Late Uruk period of Mesopotamia and the pre-dynastic Naqada culture of Egypt. The construction of several temple-like structures in that period attests to the accumulation of social power. Evidence of contact and immigration to Lower Egypt is found in the abundance of pottery vessels of southern–Levantine type, found in sites across the Nile, such as Abydos. During the last two hundred years of that period and following the unification of Egypt and pharaoh Narmer, an Egyptian colony appeared in the southern Levantine coast, with its center at Tell es-Sakan (modern-day Gaza Strip). The overall nature of this colony as well as its relation with the hinterlands has been debated by archaeologists.

The archaeologists who led the excavations at Tell es-Sakan, Pierre de Miroschedji and Moain Sadeq, suggest that Egyptian activity in the southern Levant can be divided into three areas: a core of permanent settlement in the south, a periphery of seasonal settlement extending north along the coast, and an area beyond this extending north and east where Egyptian culture interacted with local culture. Located in the area of permanent Egyptian settlement, Tell es-Sakan was likely an administrative centre.

Around 3100 BCE, the region saw radical change, with the abandonment and destruction of many settlements, including the Egyptian colony. These were quickly replaced by new walled settlements in plains and coastal regions, surrounded by mud-brick fortifications and reliant on nearby agricultural hamlets for their food. (Note: The independent Canaanite city-states of the early Bronze age (3000–2200 BCE) were situated mostly in plains or coastal regions, surrounded by defensive walls built of mud brick and guarded by watchtowers. Most of the cities were surrounded by agricultural hamlets, which supplied their food needs (Shahin 2005, p. 4).)

The Canaanite city-states held trade and diplomatic relations with Egypt and Syria. Parts of the Canaanite urban civilization were destroyed around 2500 BCE, though there is no consensus as to why (for one theory, see 4.2-kiloyear event). Incursions by nomads from the east of the Jordan River who settled in the hills followed soon thereafter, as well as cultural influence from the ancient Syrian city of Ebla. This period, dubbed the Intermediate Bronze Age (2500–2000 BCE), was recently defined out of the tail of the Early Bronze Age and the head of the Middle Bronze Age. Others date the destruction to the end of Early Bronze Age III (c. 2350/2300 BCE) and attribute it to Syrian Amorites, Kurgans, southern nomads or internal conflicts within Canaan.

In the Middle Bronze Age (2000–1500 BCE), Canaan was influenced by the surrounding civilizations of ancient Egypt, Mesopotamia, Phoenicia, Minoa Crete, and Syria. Diverse commercial ties and an agrarian based economy led to the development of new pottery forms, the cultivation of grapes, and the extensive use of bronze. Burial customs from this time seemed to be influenced by a belief in the afterlife. The Middle Kingdom Egyptian Execration Texts attest to Canaanite trade with Egypt during this period, while Minoan influence is apparent in paintings in a Canaanite palace at Tel Kabri.

A DNA analysis published in May 2020 showed that migrants from the Caucasus mixed with the local population to produce the Canaanite culture that existed during the Bronze Age.

=== Egyptian dominance ===
Between 1550 and 1400 BCE, the Canaanite city-states became vassals to the New Kingdom of Egypt. Political, commercial and military events towards the end of this period (1450–1350 BCE) were recorded by Egyptian ambassadors and Canaanite officials in 379 cuneiform tablets known as the Amarna Letters. These refer to local chieftains, such as Addaya of Gaza, Biridiya of Megiddo, Lib'ayu of Shechem, and Abdi-Heba in Jerusalem. Abdi-Heba is a Hurrian name, and enough Hurrians lived in Canaan at that time to warrant contemporary Egyptian texts naming the locals as Ḫurru.

In the first year of his reign, the pharaoh Seti I (r. c. 1294–1290 BCE) waged a campaign to re-subordinate Canaan to Egyptian rule, thrusting north as far as Beit She'an, and installing local vassals to administer the area in his name. The Egyptian Stelae in the Levant, most notably the Beisan steles, and a burial site yielding a scarab inscribed with Seti's name found within a Canaanite coffin excavated in the Jezreel Valley, attest to Egypt's presence in the area.

==== Late Bronze Age collapse ====
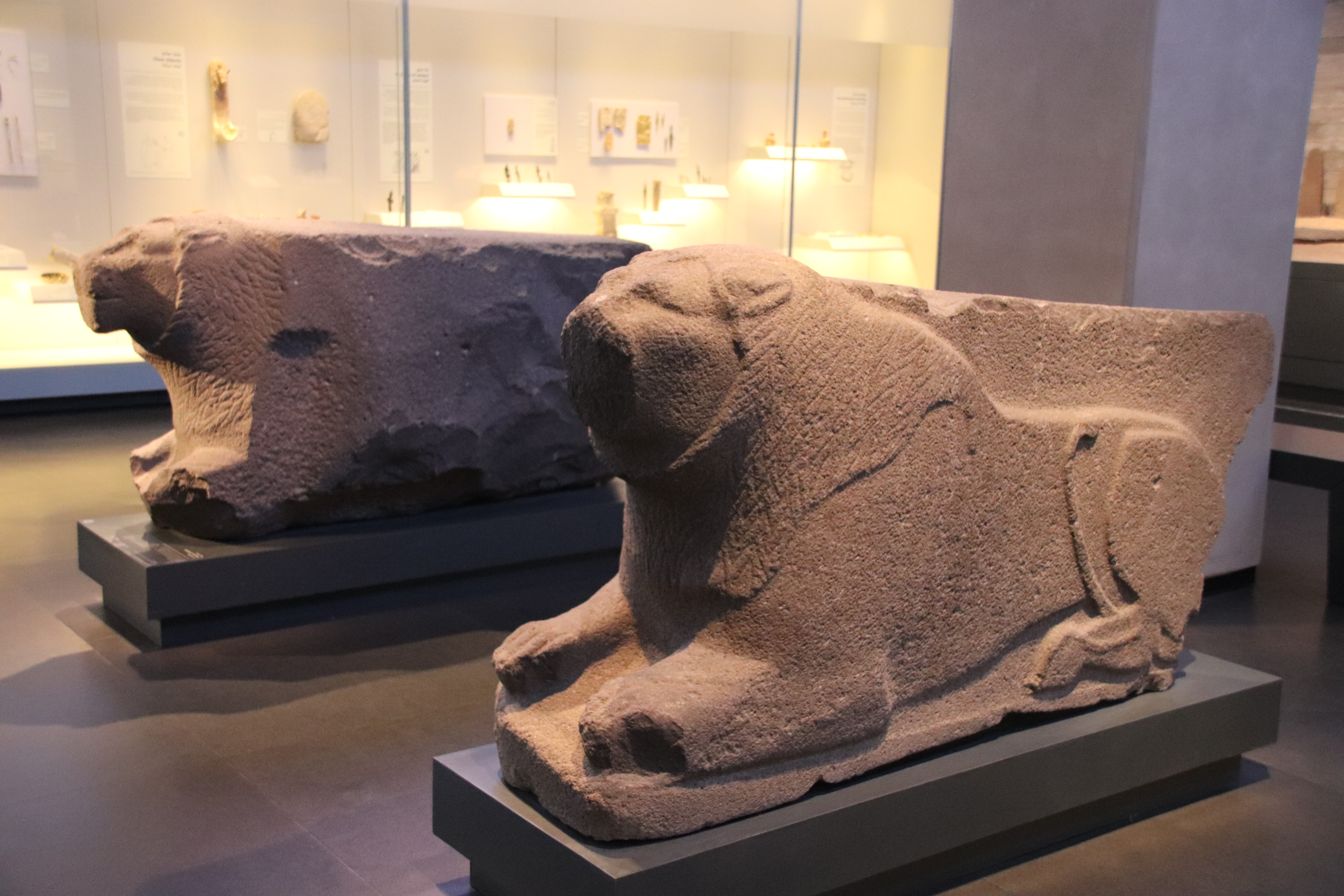
Basalt lions from the Orthostat Temple of Hazor (c. 1500–1300 BCE) Hazor was violently destroyed during the Bronze Age collapse.

The Late Bronze Age collapse greatly affected the Ancient Near East, including Canaan. The Egyptians withdrew from the area. Layers of destruction from this period were found in several sites, including Hazor, Beit She'an, Megiddo, Lachish, Ekron, Ashdod and Ashkelon. The layers of destruction in Lachish and Megiddo date back to about 1130 BCE, more than a hundred years after the destruction of Hazor circa 1250 BCE, and point to a prolonged period of decline in local civilization.

Beginning in the late 13th century and continuing to the early 11th century, hundreds of smaller, unprotected village settlements were founded in Canaan, many in elevated regions. Early forms of the four-room house appear in Timnah (Tel Batash) in this period. The number of villages declines in the 11th century, as other settlements reach the status of fortified townships. (Note: The late 13th, the 12th and the early 11th centuries BCE. were witnessing the foundations of scores if not hundreds of insignificant and unprotected village settlements, not least in the mountains of Palestine. Life must have become pretty safe. From at least the 11th century BCE, a certain reduction of the number of villages took place. This demographic change was counterbalanced by the rise of certain settlements to the status of sometimes heavily fortified townships (Lemche 2001, 9.3).)

=== Early Israelites and Philistines ===
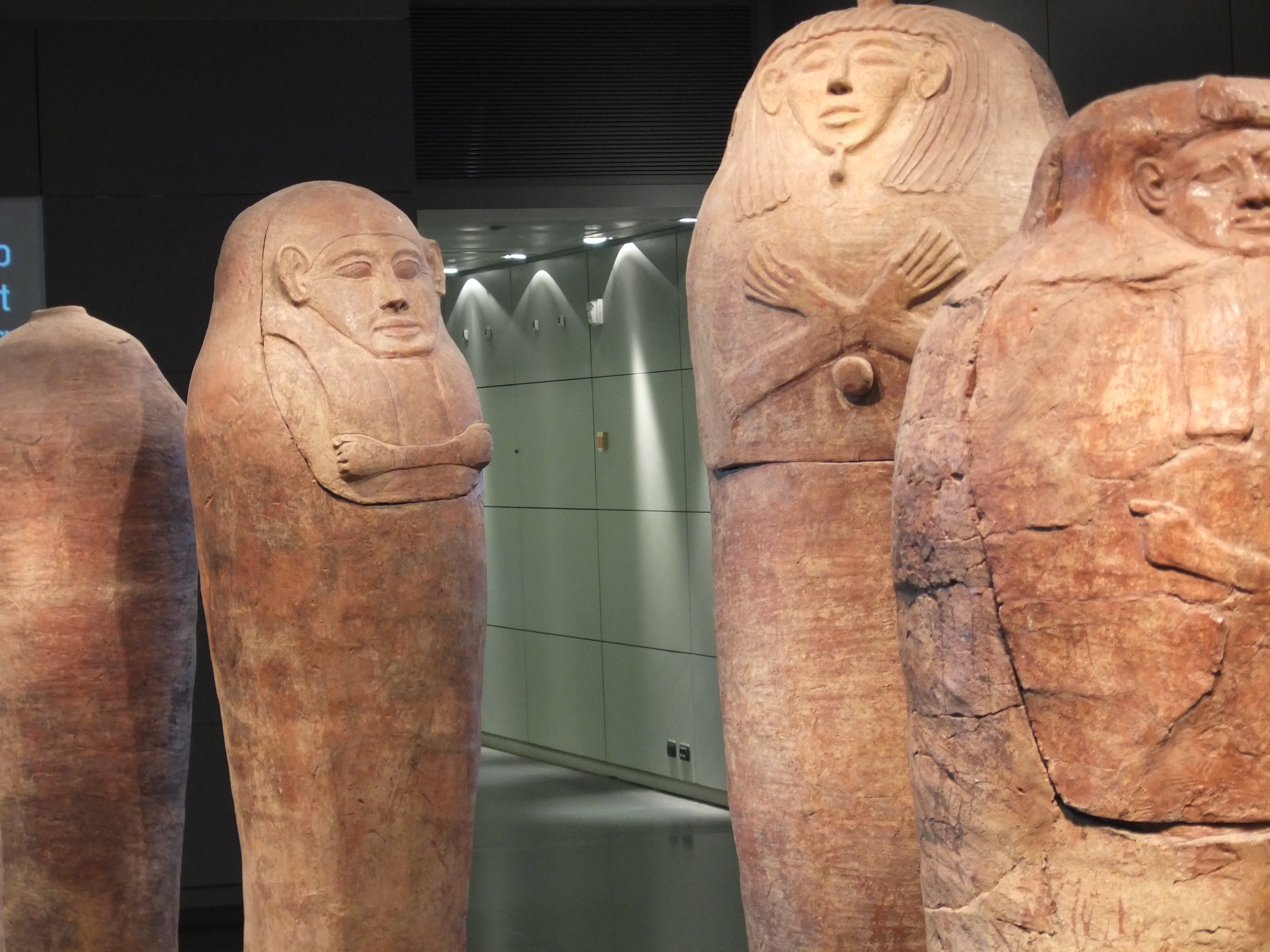
Canaanite-Philistine sarcophagi from Deir al Balah on display at the Israel Museum in Jerusalem

After the withdrawal of the Egyptians, Canaan became home to the Israelites and the Philistines. The Israelites settled the central highlands, a loosely defined highland region stretching from the Judean hills in the south to the Samarian hills in the north. Based on the archaeological evidence, they did not overtake the region by force, but instead branched out of the indigenous Canaanite peoples.

During the 12th century BCE, the Philistines, who had immigrated from the Aegean region, settled in the southern coast of Palestine. Traces of Philistines appeared at about the same time as the Israelites. The Philistines are credited with introducing iron weapons, chariots, and new ways of fermenting wine to the local population. (Note: The commerce-minded Philistines introduced new ways to ferment wine, as well as tools and weapons and chariots made with iron (Shahin 2005, p. 6).)

The practice of using anthropoid sarcophagi for burials began in Egypt and was later adopted by the Philistines. Several early Iron Age sites near Gaza City have been investigated by archaeologists, yielding incredibly rich finds dated to the Ramessid era, such as the Deir el-Balah sarcophagi, some 14 km to the south. Created locally and influenced by Egyptian styles, many of the coffins were looted by Moshe Dayan in the late 1960s before salvage excavations were conducted in the 1970s and 1980s, and some of the sarcophagi have ended up in the Israel Museum, the Hecht Museum, and the Bible Lands Museum.

=== Kingdoms of Philistia ===
Three cities listed in the Egyptian Onomasticon of Amenope (c. 1100 BCE) - Gaza, Isdud (Ashdod) and Asqalan - are mentioned in association with a people named as Peleshet (Philistines). This is the first written indication for the emergence of the Philistine pentapolis, five city-states each ruled by a king, and that for some 550 years, exercised some independence, even when subjected to overarching and alternating Egyptian or Assyrian imperial rule.

Over time, the Philistines integrated with the local population and they, like other people in Palestine, were engulfed by first the Assyrian empire and later the Babylonian empire. (Note: by the time the Assyrians ruled Palestine in 722 BCE, the Philistine had become part and parcel of the local population and the "kingdom of Israel" had been destroyed (Shahin 2005, p. 6).) In the 6th century, the Philistines as a distinct grouping or kingdom disappear from written history, (Note: The Philistines disappear from written history during the 6th century BCE (Jarus 2016).) and the name Palestine is applied by Greek geographers like Herodotus to areas beyond the former Philistian cities, beginning in the 5th century BCE.

=== Kingdoms of Israel and Judah ===
Two related Israelite kingdoms, Israel and Judah, emerged during the 10th and 9th centuries BCE: Israel in the north and Judah in the south. Israel was the more prosperous of the kingdoms and developed into a regional power. (Note: Put simply, while Judah was still economically marginal and backward, Israel was booming. ... In the next chapter we will see how the northern kingdom suddenly appeared on the ancient Near Eastern stage as a major regional power (Finkelstein & Silberman 2002, pp. 146–147)) By the 8th century BCE, the Israelite population had grown to some 160,000 individuals over 500 settlements. (Note: By the high point of this settlement wave in the eighth century BCE, after the establishment of the kingdoms of Judah and Israel, it encompassed over five hundred sites, with a population of about 160,000 (Finkelstein & Silberman 2002, p. 106).)

Israel and Judah continually clashed with the kingdoms of Ammon, Edom and Moab, located in modern-day Jordan, and with the kingdom of Aram-Damascus, located in modern-day Syria. The northwestern region of the Transjordan, known then as Gilead, was also settled by the Israelites. Biblical Hebrew flourished as a spoken language in the Kingdoms of Israel and Judah during the period from c. 1200 to 586 BCE.

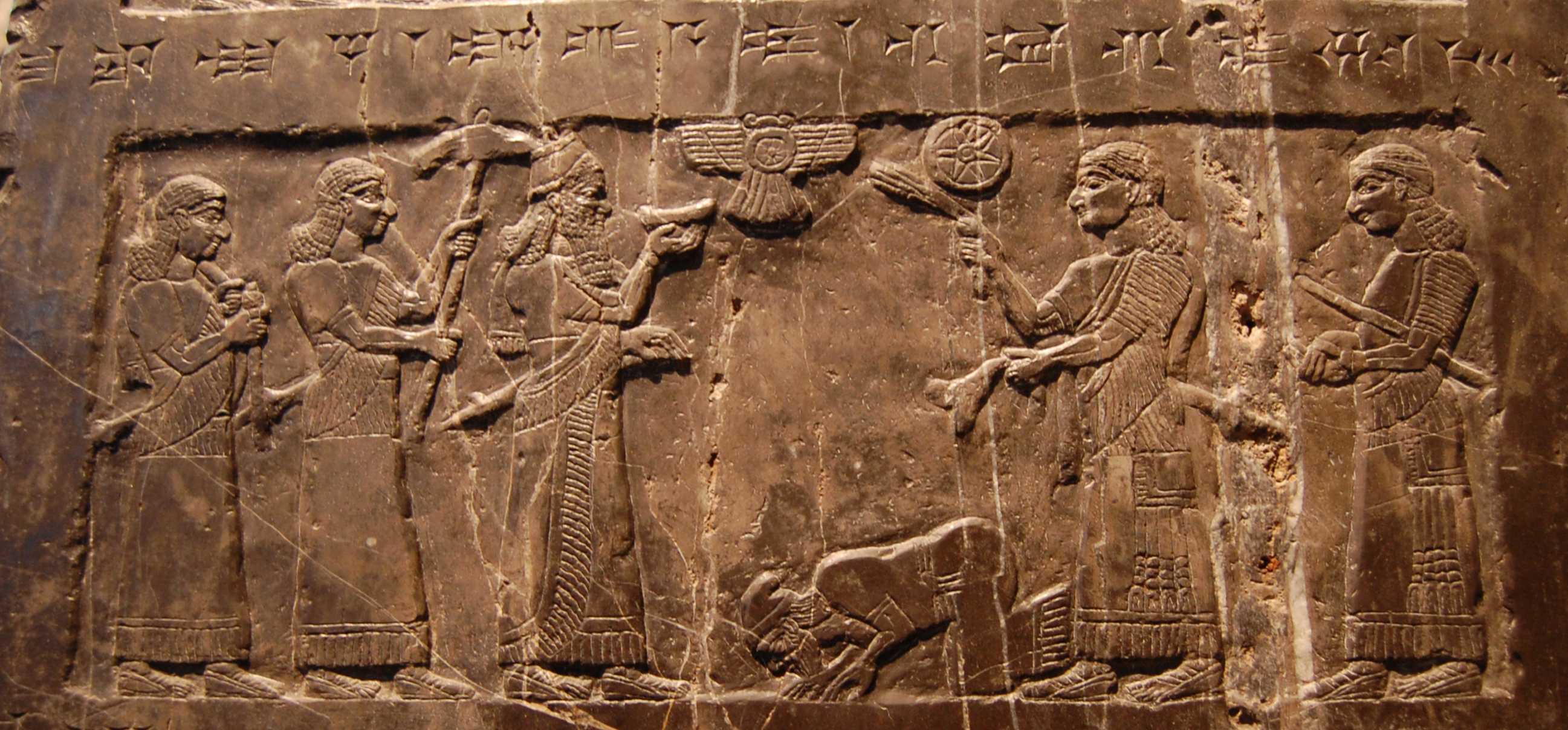
King Jehu of Israel bows before Shalmaneser III, late 9th century BCE

The Omride dynasty greatly expanded the northern kingdom of Israel. In the mid-9th century, it stretched from the vicinity of Damascus in the north to the territory of Moab in the south, ruling over a large number of non-Israelites. (Note: The kingdom of Israel under the Omrides stretched from the vicinity of Damascus throughout the central highlands and valleys of Israel, all the way to the southern territory of Moab, ruling over considerable populations of non-Israelites (Finkelstein & Silberman 2002, pp. 162–163).) In 853 BCE, the Israelite king Ahab led a coalition of anti-Assyrian forces at the Battle of Qarqar that repelled an invasion by King Shalmaneser III of Assyria. (Note: In the year 853 BCE, Shalmaneser led a major Assyrian invasion force westward to intimidate and possibly conquer the smaller states of Syria, Phoenicia, and Israel. His advancing armies were confronted by an anti-Assyrian coalition near Qarqar ... Ahab was the strongest member of the anti-Assyrian coalition. ... Shalmaneser quickly returned to Assyria, and at least for a while the Assyrian march to the west was blocked (Finkelstein & Silberman 2002, p. 163).) Some years later, King Mesha of Moab, a vassal of Israel, rebelled against it, destroying the main Israelite settlements in the Transjordan. (Note: The events recorded in the inscription took place in the ninth century BCE ... The inscription goes on to relate how Mesha gradually expanded his territory in rebellion against Israel, destroying the main settlements of the Israelites east of the Jordan, while fortifying and embellishing his own capital (Finkelstein & Silberman 2002, p. 162).) (Note: Mesha was really the king of Moab and Moab was, before Mesha's revolt, a vassal of Israel (Lemche 2001, 3.5).)

In the 830s BCE, king Hazael of Aram Damascus conquered the fertile and strategically important northern parts of Israel which devastated the kingdom. (Note: Hazael's incursion into the territory formerly controlled by Israel was clearly devastating and did much to weaken the power of the northern kingdom. ... Hazael's prime target was control of the fertile and strategic borderland between the two kingdoms, and he apparently not only conquered the Aramean lands formerly taken by the Omrides but also devastated some of Israel's most fertile agricultural region (Finkelstein & Silberman 2002, pp. 182–183)) He also destroyed the Philistine city of Gath. During the late 9th century BCE, Israel under King Jehu became a vassal to Assyria. (Note: Jehu – who bought this security to the throne by becoming an Assyrian vassal (Schneider 2011, pp. 9–10)) (Note: And while Jehu, ..., the famous "black obelisk" of Shalmaneser shows him bowing low to the ground at the feet of the great Assyrian king. Shalmaneser also notes: "The tribute of Jehu, son of Omri; ..." (Finkelstein & Silberman 2002, pp. 187–188))

=== Assyrian invasions ===
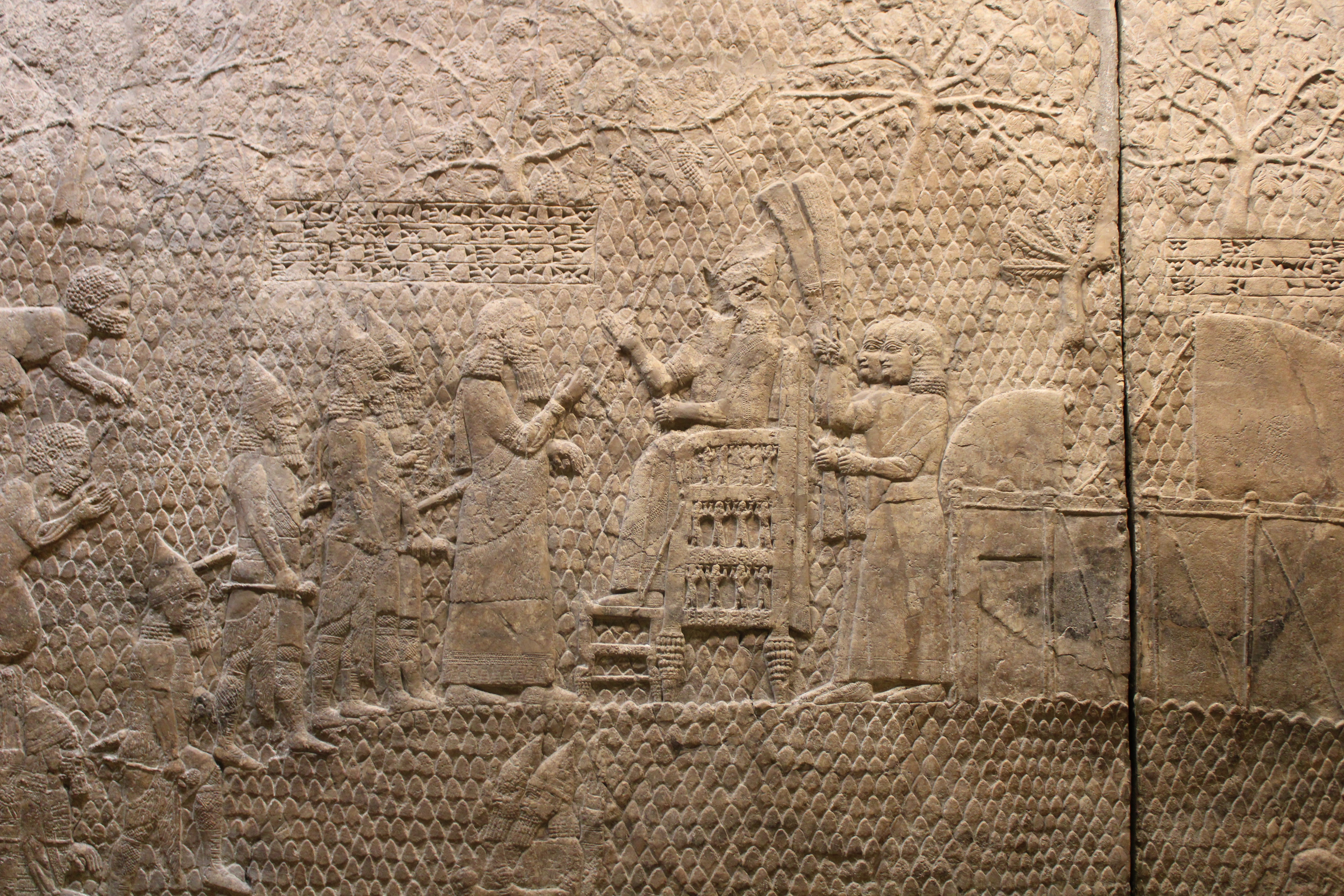
The Lachish reliefs, found in Nineveh, commemorate the story of the Assyrian victory over the kingdom of Judah during the siege of Lachish in 701 BCE

King Tiglath Pileser III of Assyria was discontent with the empire's system of vassal states and set to control them more directly or even turn then into Assyrian provinces. (Note: This new king, Tiglathpileser III ..., began ... a thorough revamping of the Assyrian empire – primarily in its relations to its former vassals, which would now be much more directly controlled. ... In the era of Assyrian imperialism that Tiglath pileser had inaugurated, vassaldom would soon give way to conquest and annexation (Finkelstein & Silberman 2002, p. 194)) Tiglath Pileser and his successors conquered Palestine beginning in 734 BCE to about 645 BCE. (Note: The conquest of Palestine began in 734 BCE. with Tiglath-pileser III and lasted to about 645 (Bagg 2013, p. 122).) This policy had lasting consequences for Palestine as its strongest kingdoms were crushed, inflicting heavy damage, and parts of the kingdoms' populations were deported. (Note: Tiglath-pileser conquered the strongest and largest kingdoms in the region, inflicting heavy damage. He deported large parts of the populations, replacing them with exiles from remote regions, and annexed their territory to Assyria, turning them into Assyrian provinces (Lipschits 2006, p. 19).)

Philistia was of very high importance to the Assyrians, and Gaza in particular, due its proximity to Egypt and being a key node in the trade of the incense route. In 734 BCE, when the Assyrians under Tiglath-Pileser III and Sargon II invaded Gaza, it had already been an established kingdom for centuries. Several kings of the Philistia city-states are mentioned in neo-Assyrian inscriptions, among them Hanunu and Sil-Bel of Gaza, a Sidqa and Mitnti I and II of Asqalan and Mitinti and Padi of 'Aqrun. The first mention of Arabs in Palestine is found in the annals of Tiglath Pileser in 734 BCE in connection with Gaza and the incense trade.

The Kingdom of Israel was eradicated in 720 BCE as its capital, Samaria, fell to the Assyrians. (Note: After the fall of Samaria, the capital of the Israelite kingdom, in 720 BCE, the Assyrian expansion under Sargon II and Sennacherib was reoriented southward, (Schipper 2011, p. 270)) The records of Sargon II indicate that he deported 27,290 inhabitants of the kingdom to northern Mesopotamia. Many Israelites migrated to the southern kingdom of Judah. When Hezekiah rose to power in Judah in 715 BCE, he forged an alliance with Egypt and Ashkelon, and revolted against the Assyrians by refusing to pay tribute.

In 701 BCE, Sennacherib laid siege to Jerusalem, though the city was never taken. According to Sennacherib's Annals, Sil-Bel, along with his fellow Philistine kings, Mitinti of Ascalon and Padi of Ekron, were given several fortified Judean cities that Sennacherib had conquered during his campaign. The Assyrian expansion continued southward, taking Thebes in 664 BCE. The kingdom of Judah, along with a line of city-states on the coastal plain were allowed to remain independent; from an Assyrian standpoint, they were weak and nonthreatening.

=== Babylonian period ===
Struggles over succession following the death of King Ashurbanipal in 631 BCE (Note: There is some debate on whether Ashurbanipal died in 631 or 627, see Lipschits 2005, p. 13 for details.) weakened the Assyrian empire. This allowed Babylon to revolt and to eventually conquer most of Assyria's territory. (Note: When Assurbanipal died in 627 BCE, ... struggles over succession led to a weakening of centralized power. ... Babylon revolted and went on the offensive against Assyria. ... All of the nations of Syria-Israel had become colonies of the Neo-Babylonian Empire by 601 BCE (Perdue & Carter 2015, p. 69).) Meanwhile, Egypt reasserted its power and created a system of vassal states in the region that were obliged to pay taxes in exchange for military protection. (Note: During this period – by 612 BCE at the latest – Psammetichus I created a system of vassal states in the Southern Levant in which local chiefs were required to pay taxes to the Egyptians in exchange for military protection, according to the Ekron letter (Schipper 2011, p. 279).)

In 616 BCE, Egypt sent its armies north to intervene on behalf of the fading Assyrian empire against the Babylonian threat. The intervention was unsuccessful; Babylon took Assyria's Nineveh in 612 BCE and two years later Harran. (Note: Egypt decided to intervene on the side of the Assyrians, and in 616 its army marched to the north. But this move did not stop the Assyrian collapse. The great Assyrian capital of Nineveh fell in 612, ..., in 610, ... the Babylonians took Haran (Finkelstein & Silberman 2002, p. 259).) In 609 the Egyptian pharaoh Necho II again marched north with his army. He executed the Judahite king Josiah at the Egyptian base Megiddo and a few months later he installed Jehoiakim as the king of Judah. (Note: ..., Josiah, the Judean Egyptian vassal, went to meet the new pharaoh on the latter's first march to Syria-Palestine in 609. Necho II met Josiah at the traditional Egyptian base of Meggido, killed him for unknown reasons, ... Necho II deposed him and instead enthroned the older son of Josiah, Eliakim, and gave him the name Jehoiakim (Schipper 2011, p. 282).) At the Battle of Carchemish in 605 BCE, the Babylonians routed the Egyptian forces, causing them to flee back to the Nile. (Note: In 605 BCE, the Babylonian crown prince later known as Nebuchadnezzar crushed the Egyptian army at Carchemish in Syria (an event recorded in Jeremiah 46:2), causing the Egyptian forces to flee (Finkelstein & Silberman 2002, pp. 260–261)) By 601 BCE, all the former states in the Levant had become Babylonian colonies.

The Babylonians continued the practices of their predecessors the Assyrians and deported populations that resisted its military might. Many of them were settled in Babylon and were used to rebuild the country which had been devastated through the long years of conflict with the Assyrians. (Note: it seems that Nebuchadrezzar used the destruction of the region as a lever for rebuilding the parts of Babylonia that had been damaged during the long years of war, devastation, and deportation inflicted by the Assyrians. Large groups of exiles from the ruling, economic, and religious elite of the local kingdoms were sent to Babylon and settled in the devastated areas to develop them (Lipschits 2005, p. 24).)

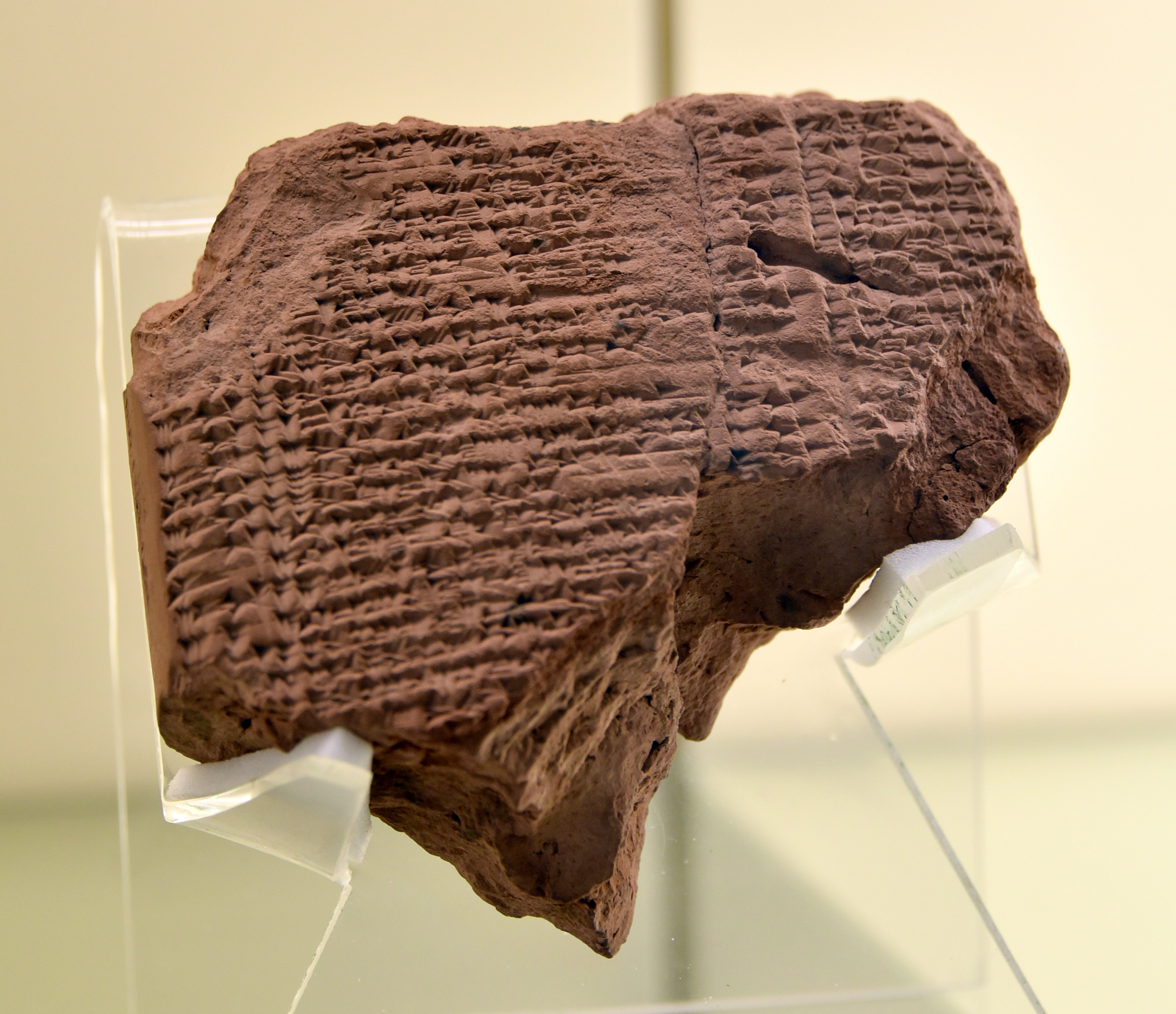
Jehoiachin's Rations Tablets, an Akkadian inscription found in Babylon and describes the rations set aside for Jeconiah of Judah during captivity

In 601 BCE Nebuchadnezzar launched a failed invasion of Egypt which forced him to withdraw to Babylon to rebuild his army. This failure was interpreted as a sign of weakness, causing some vassal states to defect, among them Judah, leading to the Judahite–Babylonian War. (Note: On the last occasion (601/600), Nebuchadnezzar clashed with an Egyptian army, with heavy losses; this reverse was followed by the defection of certain vassal states, Judah among them. This brought an intermission in the series of annual campaigns in 600/599, while Nebuchadnezzar remained in Babylonia repairing his losses of chariots (Saggs 2010).) Nebuchadnezzar responded by laying siege to Jerusalem in 598 to end its revolt. (Note: He attacked Judah a year later and captured Jerusalem on 16 March 597 (Saggs 2010)) In 597, the king Jeconiah of Judah, together with Jerusalem's aristocracy and priesthood, were deported to Babylon.

In 587 BCE, Nebuchadnezzar besieged and destroyed Jerusalem, bringing an end to the kingdom of Judah. A large number of Judahites were exiled to Babylon. Judah and the Philistine city-states of Gaza, Ashkelon, Ashdod, and Ekron, were dissolved and incorporated into the Neo-Babylonian Empire as provinces. (Note: The semi-independent kingdoms in southern Palestine (Judah and the Philistine kingdoms of Gaza, Ashkelon, Ashdod and Ekron) ... were dissolved during Nebuchadnezzar's reign and they too were incorporated into the Chaldaean provinces (Ephal 2000, p. 142)) Judah became the province of Yehud, a Jewish administrative division of the Neo-Babylonian Empire. (Note: a province with its capital at Mizpah, just north of Jerusalem. ... Throughout this era, the province was called Yehud (Noll 2013, p. 338))

== Achaemenid period ==
Following Cyrus the Great's conquest of Babylon in 539 BCE, Palestine became part of the Persian Achaemenid Empire. (Note: in October 539, the Persian king took Babylon and captured its king Nabonidus. ...The Babylonian Empire had been large, and Cyrus now became ruler of Syria and Palestine as well (Lendering: Cyrus the Great).) At least five Persian provinces existed in the Palestine region as part of the satrapy of Eber-Nari: Yehud Medinata, Samaria, Gaza, Ashdod, and Ascalon. The Phoenician city-states continued to prosper in present-day Lebanon, while Arab tribal groups led by kings (like the Qedarites and Nabataeans) were in control of southern Palestine and northern Sinai, not organized as an official province, but paying tribute to the empire in the form of "gifts", such as talents of incense.

By the 6th century BCE, Aramaic became the common language in the north, in Galilee and Samaria, replacing Hebrew as the spoken language in Palestine, and it became the region's lingua franca. Hebrew remained in limited use in Judah; however the returning exiles brought back Aramaic influence, and Aramaic was used for communicating with other ethnic groups during the Persian period. Hebrew remained as a language for the upper class and as a religious language.

In contrast to his predecessors, who controlled conquered populations using mass deportations, Cyrus issued a proclamation granting subjugated nations religious freedom, with exiled Judeans returning to Jerusalem in 538 BCE. According to scholars, this policy helped them to present themselves as liberators, gaining them the goodwill of the people. (Note: Cyrus' Edict ... indicate that Cyrus and his successors maintained a policy of repatriation for some 80 years (Ephal 2000, p. 151).)

The Judeans, who later came to be known as Jews, settled in what became known as Yehud Medinata or Yehud, a self-governing province under Persian rule. The First Temple in Jerusalem, which had been destroyed by the Babylonians, was rebuilt under the auspices of the returned Jewish population.

Major religious transformations took place in Yehud Medinata. it was during that period that the Israelite religion became exclusively monotheistic – the existence of other Gods was now denied. Previously, Yahweh, Israel's national god, had been seen as one god among many. (Note: One developing consensus of the past couple of decades is that ancient Israel was basically a polytheistic society, though Yhwh functioned in some way as a national/ethnic god (much as Chemosh did for the Moabites and Qaus/Qos for the Edomites) for both Israel and Judah (Grabbe 2006).) Many customs and behavior that would come to characterize Judaism were adopted. (Note: Norms of behaviour, as well as social patterns, that were to characterize the Jewish people for many generations to come began to crystallize during the Persian period (Ephal 1998, p. 119).)

The region of Samaria was inhabited by the Samaritans, an ethno-religious group who also worship Yahweh, and claim descent from the original Israelites. The Samaritan temple cult, centered around Mount Gerizim, competed with the Judean temple cult centered around Mount Moriah in Jerusalem and led to long-lasting animosity between the two groups. (Note: The Samaritans are known from the Gospel of Luke's parable of the Good Samaritan which depicts the "Good" Samaritan as a hated foreigner (Lynwood Smith 2015, p. 133).) Remnants of their temple at Mount Gerizim near Shechem date to the 5th century. (Note: Furthermore, the temple rested on foundations ... from a temple built no later than the mid-fifth century BCE (Hjelm 2010, p. 26).)

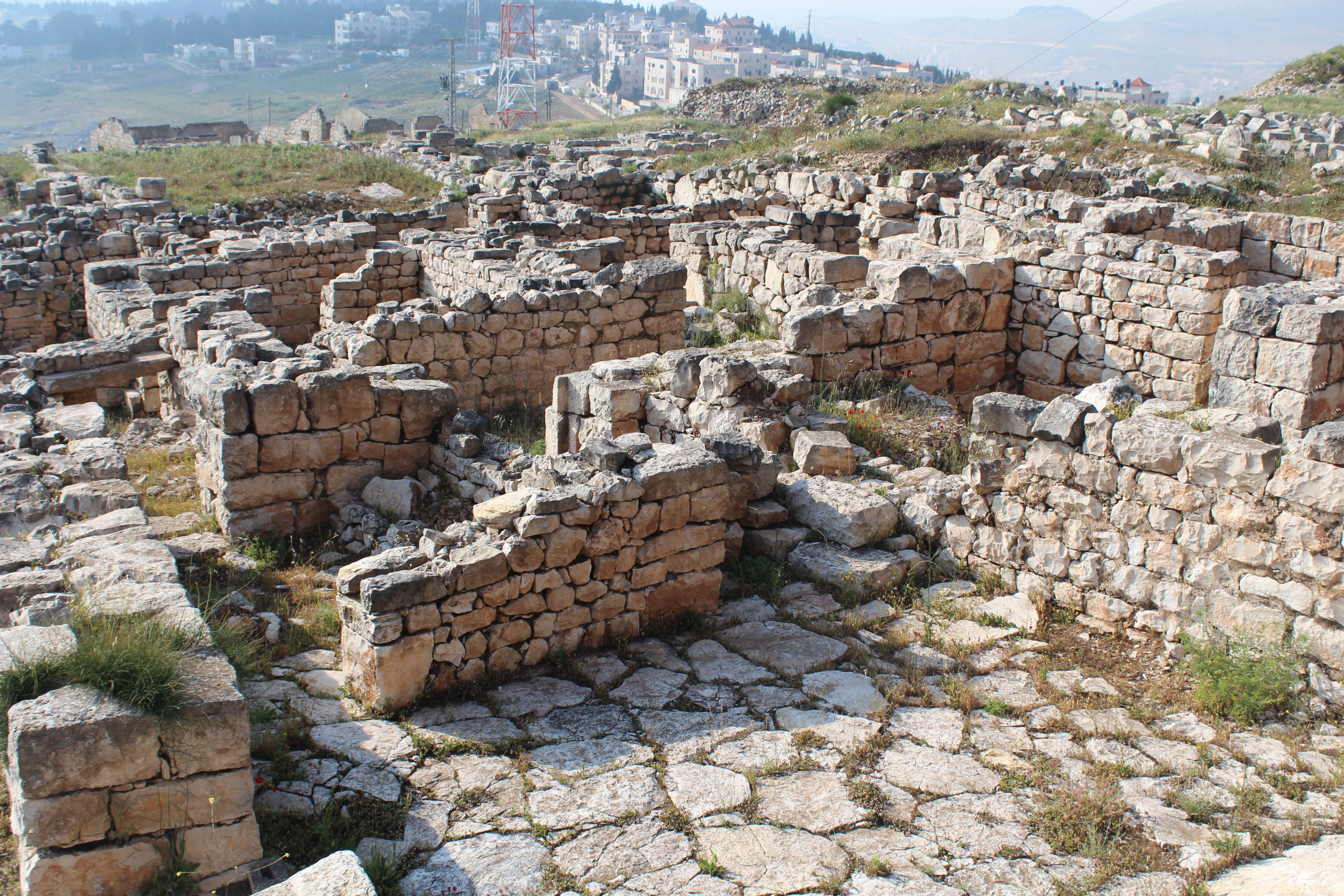
The Samaritan temple on Mount Gerizim

Another people in Palestine was the Edomites. Originally, their kingdom was in the southern area of modern-day Jordan but they were pushed westward into the northern Negev (and southern part of Judah) by nomadic tribes coming from the east beginning a generation or two before the Babylonian conquest. Their territory became known as Idumea.

Around the turn of the 6th and 5th centuries BCE, the Persians gave the Phoenician kings of Tyre and Sidon, based in modern-day Lebanon, control over the coastal plain all the way to Ashdod. Perhaps to facilitate maritime trade or as a repayment for their naval services. (Note: which he had received from the king of Persia ("the lord of Kings") as a reward for "the important deeds which I did" (Ephal 2000, p. 144)) At about the same time, the Upper Galilee was also granted to Tyre. (Note: We may also accept the Idea that in the early fifth century BCE. the Achaemenids granted Upper Galilee and the area east of Tyre to the Tyrians (Lipschits 2006, p. 27).) In the middle of the 4th century the Phoenicians occupied the entire coast as far as Ascalon in the southern coastal plain. (Note: around the middle of the fourth century, Phoenicians were occupying the entire coast ... as far as Ascalon in southern Palestine (Ephal 2000, p. 150))

Gaza port was a key import-export point and free trade zone under Perisan rule. Nomadic Arab tribes in the Negev desert were considered "friends" with the empire rather than subjects and they enjoyed some independence from Persia, due to their control of desert trade routes stretching from Gaza in the north to the Arabian peninsula in the south.

Until the middle of the 4th century, the Qedarites were the dominant tribe whose territory ran from the Hejaz in the south to the Negev in the north. (Note: All that can be said with certainty is that the Nabataeans are known in the sources since the fourth century B.C. Up to that time the Qedarites, the dominant Arab tribe of the Persian period, controlled the south from the Hejaz and all of the Negev (Wenning 2007, p. 26)) Around 380 BCE, the Qedarites joined a failed revolt against the Persians and as a consequence they lost their frankincense trade privileges. The trade privileges were taken over by the Nabataeans, an Arab tribe whose capital was in Petra in Transjordan. They also established themselves in the Negev where they built a flourishing civilization.

Despite the devastating Greco-Persian Wars, Greek cultural influences rose steadily. Greek coins began to circulate in the late 6th and early 5th centuries. (Note: The earliest coins found in Palestine are of Greek origin: archaic and early classicial coinage of the late sixth and early fifth centuries BCE (Hübner 2014, p. 161)) Greek traders established trading posts along the coast in the 6th century from which Greek ceramics, artworks, and other luxury items were imported. These items were popular and no well-to-do household in Palestine would have lacked Greek pottery. Local potters imitated the Greek merchandise, though the quality of their goods were inferior. (Note: it did not take long for local potters to imitate those fine wares, though they could not duplicate the high quality of manufacture for which the Greeks were known (Meyers & Chancey 2012, pp. 3–4)) The first coins in Palestine, known as Philisto-Arabian, were minted in Gaza, Isdud and Asqalan. (Note: The so-called Philisto-Arabian coins are among the oldest in Palestine. The mints were located in Gaza, Ashkelon, and Ashdod (Hübner 2014, p. 162).) Yehud began minting coins in the second quarter of the 4th century. (Note: Since the second quarter of the fourth century, coins were also minted in the province of Judah (Hübner 2014, p. 165))

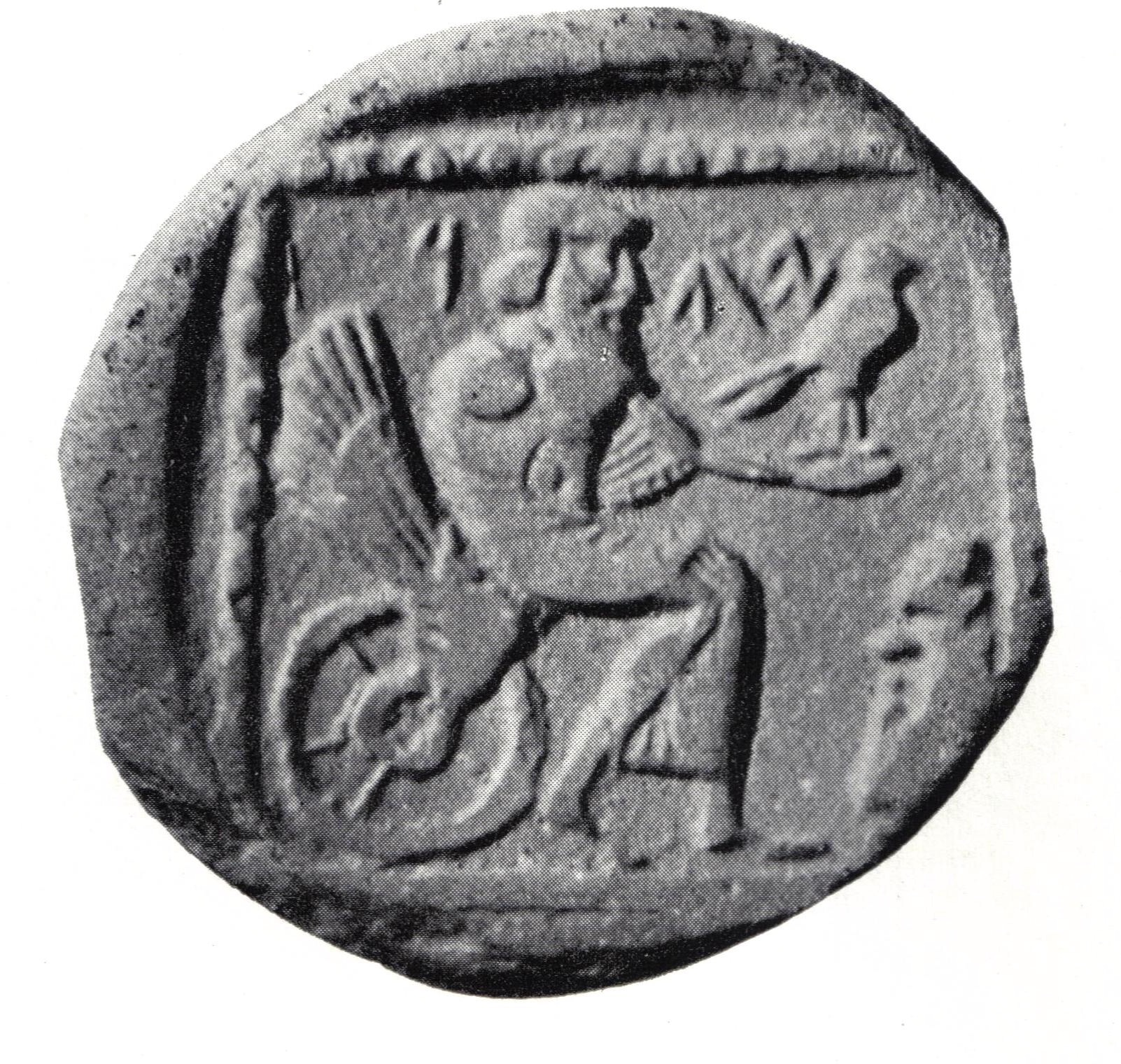
The God on the Winged Wheel coin, known since 1814, originally from Gaza, likely during the Achaemenid Empire in the 4th century BCE. The coin shows a deity seated on a winged wheel, often interpreted as a depiction of Yahweh.

In 404 BCE, Egypt threw off the Persian yoke and began extending its domain of influence and military might in Palestine and Phoenicia, leading to confrontations with Persia. The political pendulum swung back and forth as territory was conquered and reconquered. For a brief period of time, Egypt controlled both coastal Palestine and Phoenicia. Egypt was eventually reconquered by Persia in 343.

== Hellenistic period ==
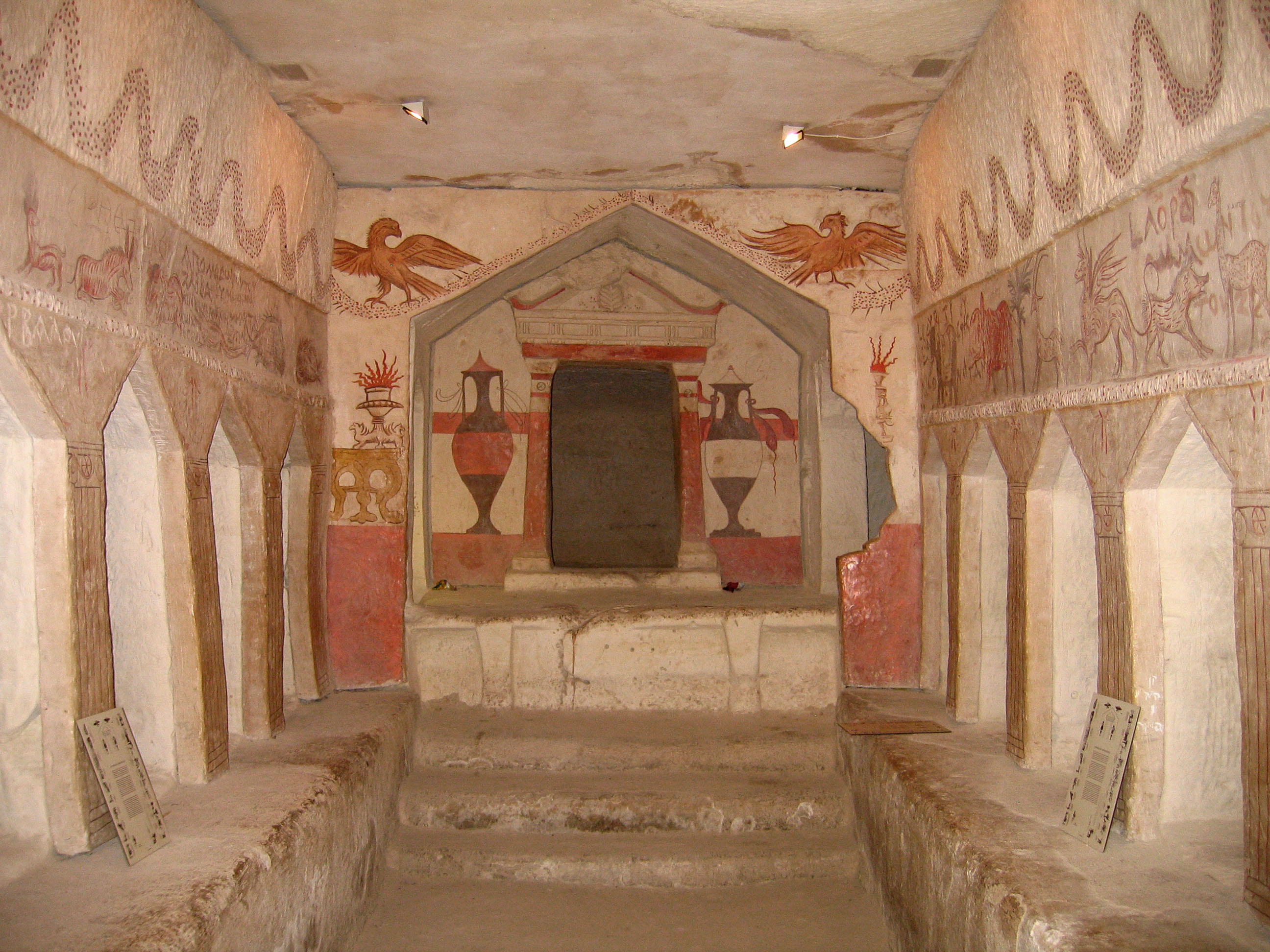
The Sidonian Tomb at Maresha, dated to the 3rd and 2nd centuries BCE

Hellenistic Palestine is the term for Palestine during the Hellenistic period, when Achaemenid Syria was conquered by Alexander the Great in 333 BCE and subsumed into his growing Macedonian empire. Persian control of the region had already waned, facilitating Alexander's advance in most of the region. Notable exceptions were the multi-month sieges of Tyre and Gaza.

After his death in 323 BCE, Alexander's empire was divided among his generals, the Diadochi, marking the beginning of Macedonian rule over various territories, including Coele-Syria. The region came under Ptolemaic rule beginning when Ptolemy I Soter took control of Egypt in 322 BCE and Palestine in 320 BCE due to its strategic significance. This period saw conflicts as former generals vied for control, leading to ongoing power struggles and territorial exchanges.

Ptolemaic rule brought stability and economic prosperity to the region. Ptolemy I and his successor, Ptolemy II Philadelphus, prevailed over the Seleucids in the first and second Syrian Wars, and inaugurated several large-scale construction projects for existing and new poleis like Acre which was renamed Ptolemais, Scythopolis and Philoteria. Despite these successes, ongoing conflicts with the Seleucids, particularly over the strategic region of Coele-Syria, led to more Syrian Wars. The region's control fluctuated due to the military campaigns and political maneuvers.

Seleucid rule began in 198 BCE under Antiochus III the Great, who, like the Ptolemies, allowed the Jews to retain their customs and religion. However, financial strains due to obligations to Rome led to unpopular measures, such as temple robberies, which ultimately resulted in Antiochus III's death in 187 BCE. His successors faced similar challenges, with internal conflicts and external pressures leading to dissatisfaction among the local population. The Maccabean Revolt, led by Judas Maccabeus, (Note: Also spelled Judah Maccabeus) highlighted the growing unrest and resistance against Seleucid authority, eventually leading to significant shifts in power dynamics within the region.

The local Hasmonean dynasty emerged from the Maccabean Revolt, with Simon Thassi becoming high priest and ruler, establishing an independent Judea. (Note: Judea's level of independence under the Hasmoneans has been discussed at length. Schwartz writes that "the period of truly independent rule by the Hasmonean dynasty was very brief and, even then, the Jewish rulers never fully ceased being vassals of their stronger neighbors". Schäfer writes that by 111 BCE, due to internal struggles for the Seleucid throne "Judaea was effectively an independent state and John Hyrcanus a sovereign ruler.") As Seleucid power weakened, the Hasmonean kingdom moved to expand its borders. John Hyrcanus annexed Idumaea, Samaria, and parts of Transjordan and, according to Josephus, forced the Idumaeans to convert to Judaism. His son Judah Aristobulus I took Galilee and the Golan. Alexander Jannaeus added the coastal plain and further Transjordan, bringing the kingdom to its greatest extent. After his death, Salome Alexandra reigned as queen, with Hyrcanus II serving as high priest.

== Roman period ==
In 63 BCE, a war of succession in the Hasmonean court between Hyrcanus II and his younger brother Aristobulus II provided the Roman general Pompey with the opportunity to make the Jewish kingdom a client of Rome, starting a centuries-long period of Roman rule. (Note: See Third Mithridatic War and Siege of Jerusalem (37 BC) for details on Pompey's conquest.) After sacking Jerusalem, he installed Hyrcanus II as High Priest but denied him the title of king. Most of the territory the Hasmoneans had conquered were awarded to other kingdoms, and Judea now only included Judea proper, Samaria (except for the city of Samaria which was renamed Sebaste), southern Galilee, and eastern Idumaea. In 57 BCE, the Romans and Jewish loyalists stamped out an uprising organized by Hyrcanus' enemies. Hoping to quell further unrest, the Romans restructured the kingdom into five autonomous districts, each with its own religious council with centers in Jerusalem, Sepphoris, Jericho, Amathus, and Gadara.

Poleis that had been occupied or even destroyed by the Hasmoneans were rebuilt and they regained their self-governing status. This amounted to a rebirth for many of the Greek cities and made them Rome's trusty allies in an otherwise unruly region. They expressed their gratitude by adopting new dating systems commemorating Rome's advent, renaming themselves after Roman officials, or minting coins with monograms and imprints of Roman officials.

The turmoil in the Roman world brought by the Roman civil wars relaxed Rome's grip on Judea. In 40 BCE, the Parthian Empire and their Jewish ally Antigonus the Hasmonean defeated a pro-Roman Jewish force led by high priest Hyrcanus II, Phasael and Herod I, the son of Hyrcanus' leading partisan Antipater. They managed to conquer Syria and Palestine. Antigonus was made King of Judea. Herod fled to Rome, where he was elected "King of the Jews" by the Roman Senate and was given the task of retaking Judea. In 37 BCE, with Roman support, Herod reclaimed Judea, and the short-lived reemergence of the Hasmonean dynasty came to an end.

=== Herodian dynasty and Roman Judea ===
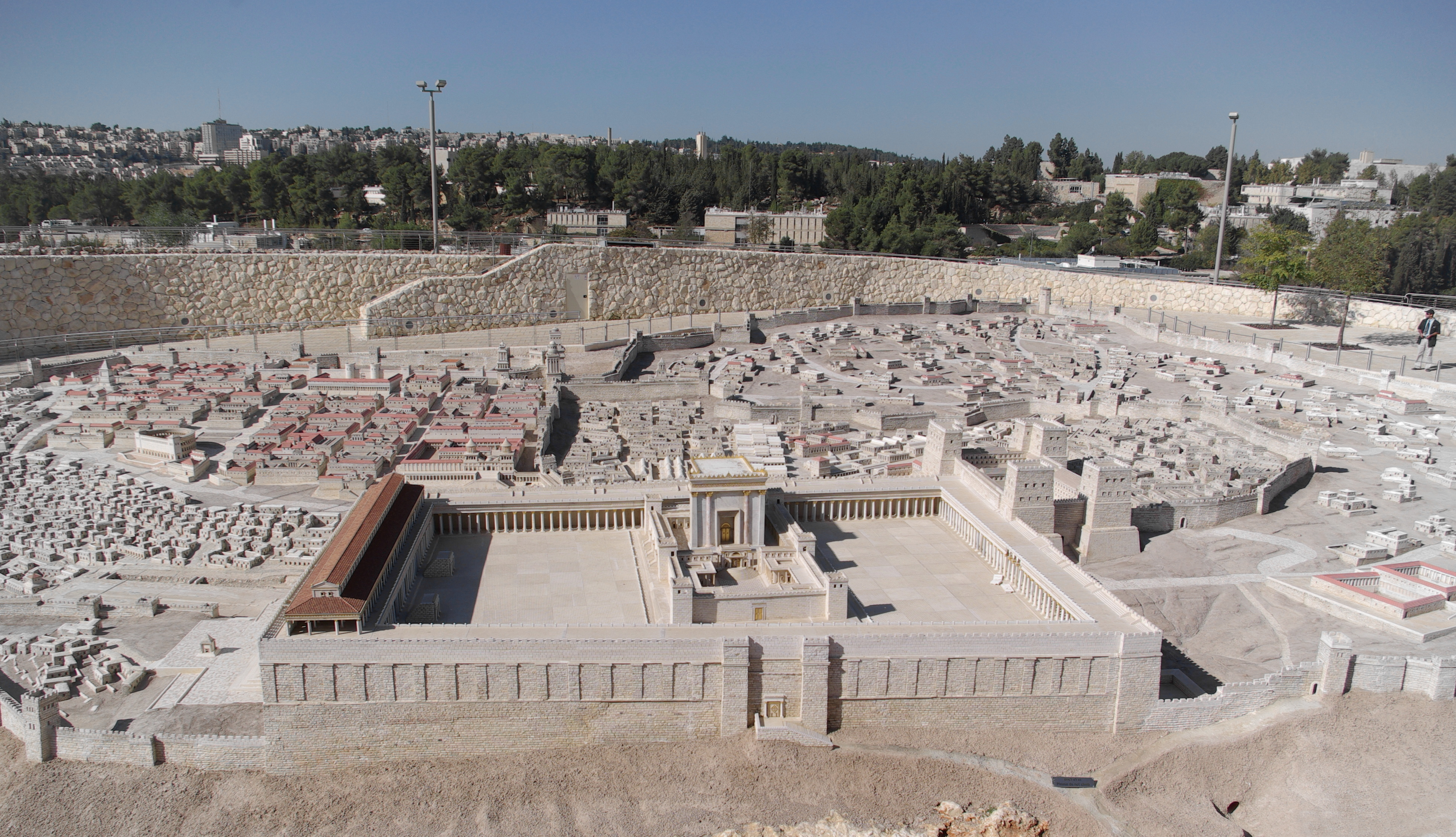
Holyland Model of Jerusalem, depicting it during the Second Temple period. Herod's Temple is in the middle.

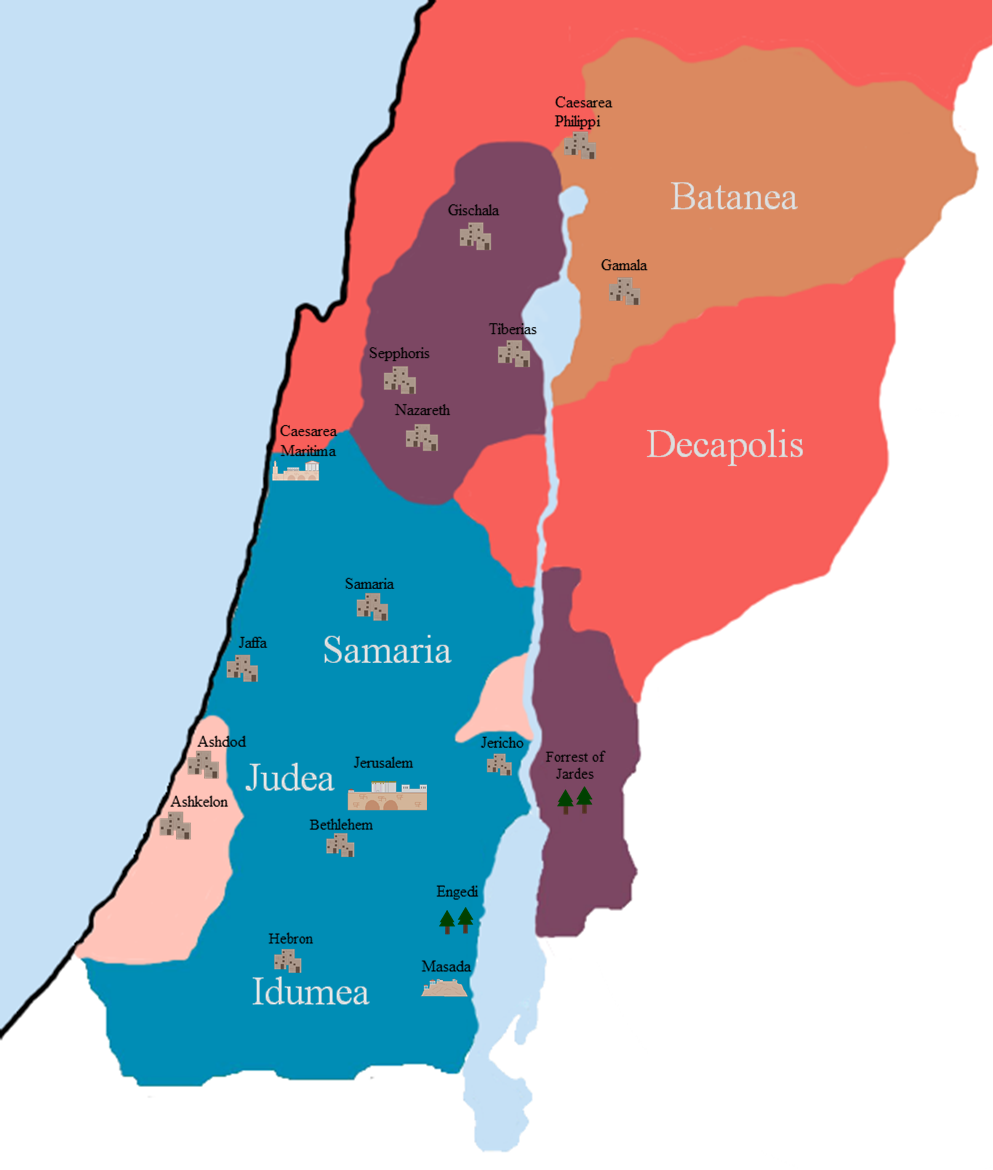
Herod's kingdom: Herod Archelaus' territory in blue, Herod Antipas' in purple, Philip the Tetrarch's in brown, and Salome I's in pink. Province of Syria in red.

Herod I, or as became known, Herod the Great, ruled from 37 to 4 BCE. He became known for his many building projects, for increasing the region's prosperity, but also for being a tyrant and involved in many political and familial intrigues. (Note: Herod ... who built many ... public buildings and generally raised the prosperity of his land but who was the centre of political and family intrigues in his later years (Perowne 1999).)

Herod rebuilt Jerusalem from top to bottom, greatly increasing the city's prestige, including the reconstruction of the Second Temple. Herod also greatly expanded the port town of Caesarea Maritima, making it by far the largest port in Roman Judea and one of the largest in the whole eastern Mediterranean.

Throughout this period, the Jewish population gradually increased, and the region saw a massive wave of urbanization. More than 30 towns and cities of different sizes were founded, rebuilt, or enlarged in a relatively short period. The Jewish population of the land on the eve of the great revolt may have been as high as 2.2 million. Jerusalem itself reached a peak in size and population at the end of the Second Temple period, when the city covered two square kilometres (3/4 square mile) and had a population of 200,000.

Following Herod's death in 4 BCE, unrest shook the region. It was swiftly quashed by Herod's son Archelaus with the help of the Romans. (Note: As soon as Herod the Great died in 4 BCE, a wave of unrest surged through Palestine. Herod's son Archelaus quickly put down the demonstrations, with the aid of Roman troops as well as Herod's army (Grabbe 2010, p. 71).) Herod's kingdom was divided and given to his three sons. In 6 CE Archelaus was banished for misrule and Judea came under direct Roman rule. (Note: It is not known whether Judea was a Roman province in the full sense of its meaning or only a part of the province of Syria with separate administration. Current knowledge of so-called "equestrian administration" points towards the second possibility (Haensch 2010, p. 2).)

=== Jewish–Roman wars ===
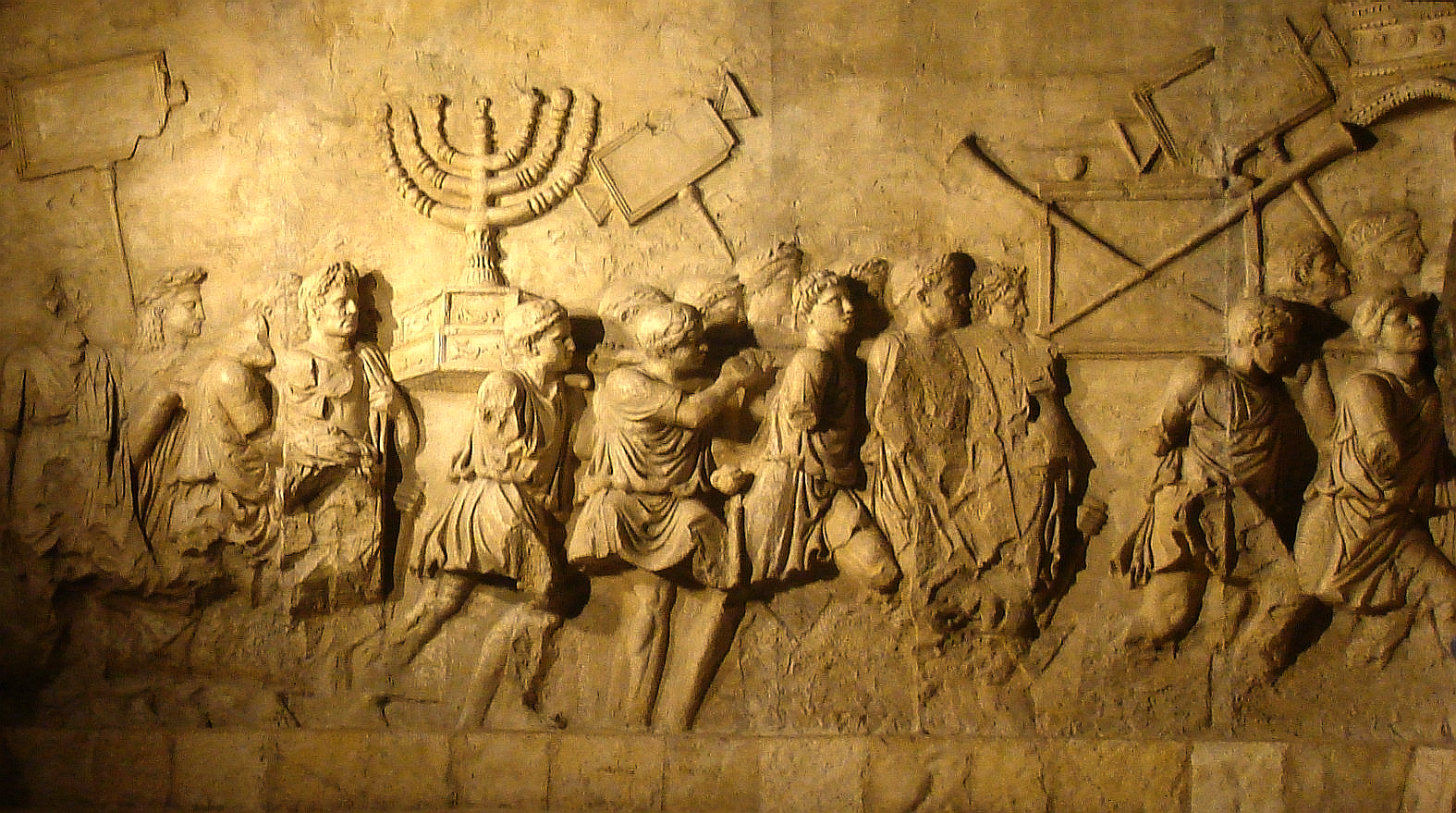
The Arch of Titus in Rome commemorates Titus' victory in the First Jewish–Roman War

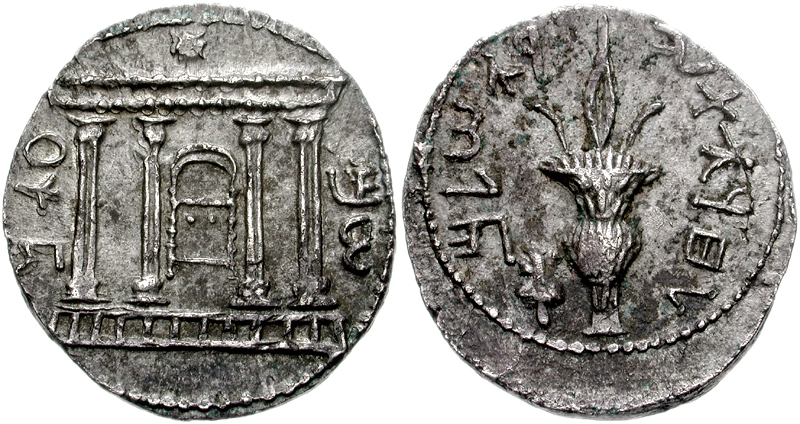
Coinage of the Bar Kochba Revolt (c. 132–135 CE)

In 66 CE, the First Jewish–Roman War, also known as the Great Jewish Revolt, erupted. The war lasted for four years and was crushed by the Roman emperors Vespasian and Titus. In 70 CE, the Romans captured the city of Jerusalem and destroyed both the city and the Second Temple. The events were described by the Jewish historian Josephus, who writes that 1,100,000 Jews perished during the revolt, while a further 97,000 were taken captive. The Fiscus Judaicus was imposed on Jews all across the Roman Empire as part of reparations.

In 132 CE, a second uprising, the Bar Kokhba revolt erupted and took three years to put down. It incurred massive costs on both sides, and saw a major shift in the population of Palestine. The sheer scale and scope of the overall destruction is described in a late epitome of Dio Cassius's Roman History, where he states that Roman war operations in the country had left some 580,000 Jews dead, with many more dying of hunger and disease, while 50 of their most important outposts and 985 of their most famous villages were razed to the ground. According to Cassius, "nearly the whole of Judaea was made desolate".

=== Province of Syria Palaestina ===
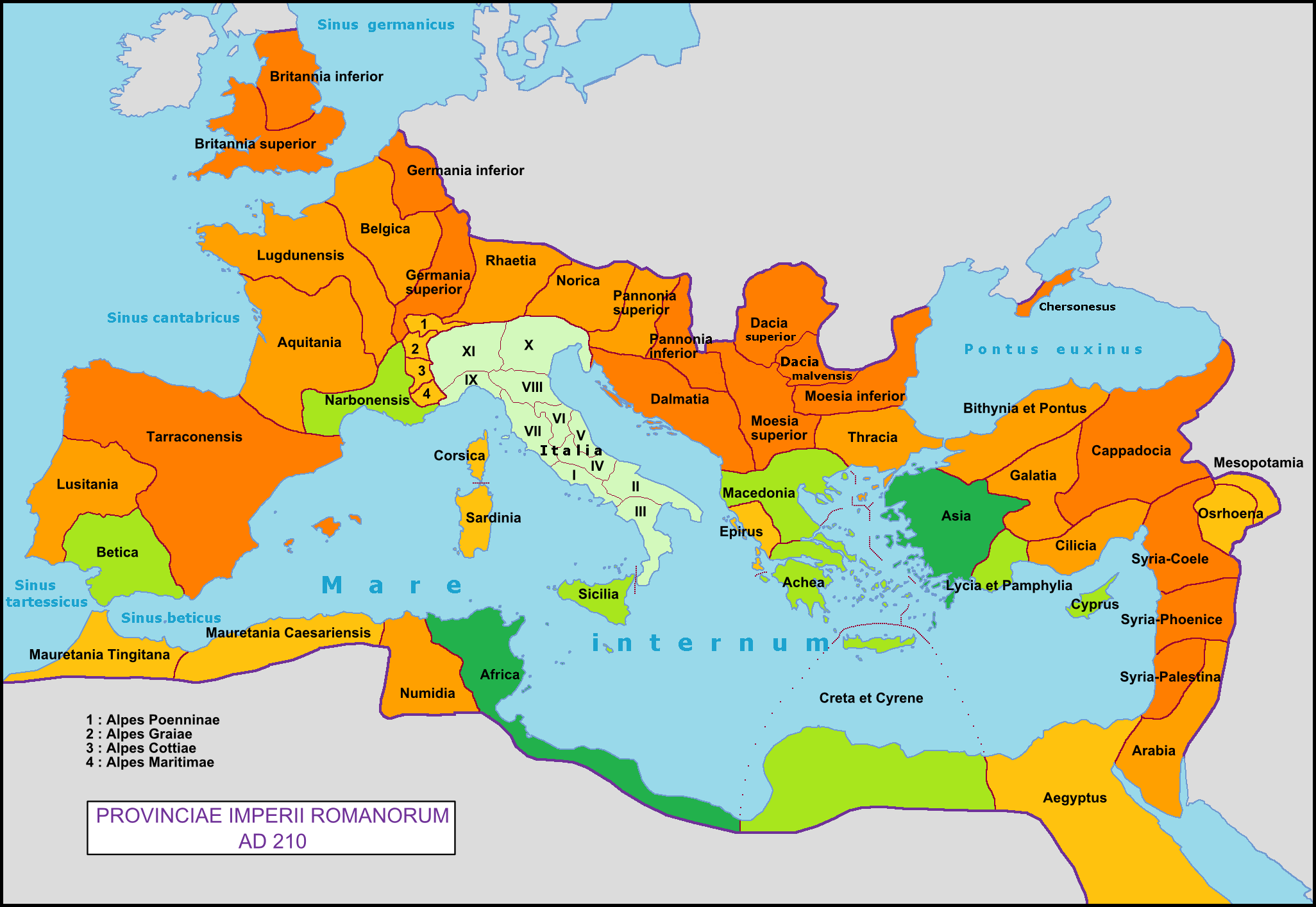
Provinces of the Roman Empire c. 210 CE

During or after the Bar Kohkba Revolt, Hadrian joined the province of Judea with Galilee and the Paralia to form the new province of Syria Palaestina. (Note: The reason for the reorganization and renaming is not known. Many historians have asserted that the renaming was an attempt by emperor Hadrian to disassociate Jews from Judea. Other historians dispute that theory.) Some scholars view these actions as an attempt to disconnect the Jewish people from their homeland, (Note: "It seems clear that by choosing a seemingly neutral name – one juxtaposing that of a neighboring province with the revived name of an ancient geographical entity (Palestine), already known from the writings of Herodotus – Hadrian was intending to suppress any connection between the Jewish people and that land." Lewin 2005, p. 33) but this theory is debated.

Jerusalem was re-established as the Aelia Capitolina, a greatly diminished military colony with perhaps no more than 4,000 residents. (Note: Even Geva's minimalist estimate of a population of 4,000 or fewer for Aelia Capitolina may be high (Seligman 2017, p. 116)) Jews were banned from the city and from settling in its vicinity as punishment for the Bar Kokbha revolt, (Note: Christian and Rabbinic sources claim that Roman law now forbade Jews to resettle the area around Jerusalem – an area that covered almost the entire historic district of Judaea (Schwartz 2016, p. 248).) though the ban was not strictly enforced and a slow trickle of Jews settled in the city over the subsequent centuries. In the late 2nd and early 3rd century, new cities were founded at Eleutheropolis, Diospolis, and Nicopolis.

In the 260s, the Palmyrene king Odaenathus helped the Romans defeat the Persians (Sasanian Empire) and became, though nominally still Rome's vassal, the real ruler of Syria Palaestina and Rome's other holdings in the Near East. His widow Zenobia declared herself the Empress of the breakaway Palmyrene Empire but she was defeated by the Romans in 272. (Note: At Antioch and at Emesa he scored a decisive victory against the Palmyrene army and in 272 he forced Palmyra to surrender (Dignas & Winter 2007, p. 161).)

== Byzantine period ==
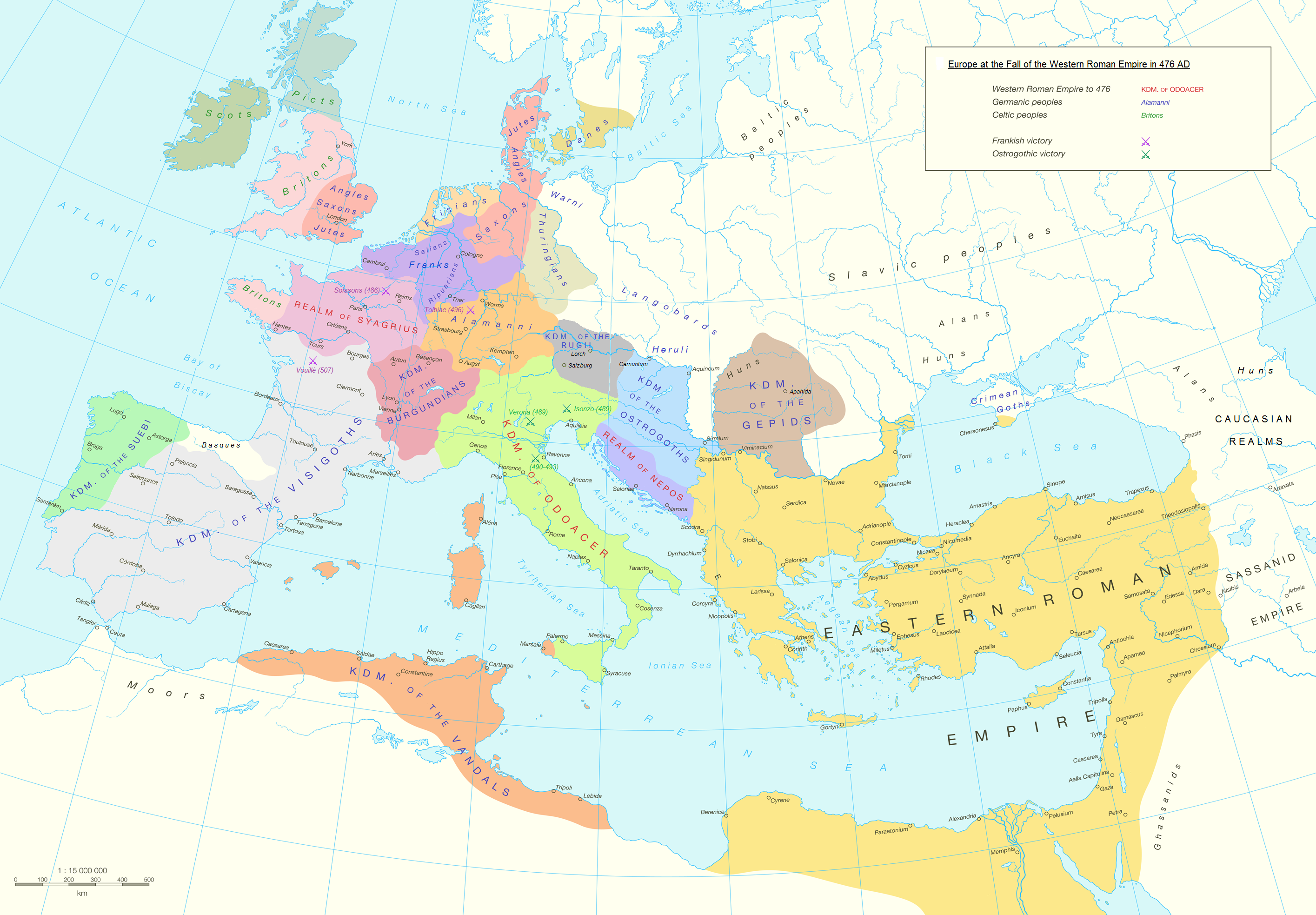
The Byzantine Empire in 476

The tide turned in Christianity's favor in the 4th century. The century began with the most intense persecution of Christians the empire had seen, (Note: In late February of 303, the emperor Diocletian and his imperial colleagues issued an edict ordering churches to be destroyed, scriptures to be burned, and Christians to be dismissed from government service and stripped of civil rights. ... This marked the formal opening of the Great Persecution, the last and most brutal assault on Christians by the pagan Roman state (Gaddis 1999, p. 29).) but ended with Christianity becoming the Roman state church. (Note: Theodosius's great contribution to the empire came when he made Roman Christianity the official state religion in 380 (Middleton 2015, p. 937).) Perhaps more than half of the empire's population had then converted to Christianity. (Note: in the fourth century, when it seems likely that more than half the inhabitants of the Roman world converted to Christianity (Mitchell 2014, p. 242)) Instrumental to this transformation was Rome's first Christian emperor Constantine the Great. He had ascended the throne by defeating his competitors in a series of civil wars and he credited his victories to Christianity. Constantine became a fervent supporter of Christianity and issued laws conveying upon the church and its clergy fiscal and legal privileges and immunities from civic burdens. (Note: Constantine began issuing laws conveying upon the church and its clergy fiscal and legal privileges and immunities from civic burdens (Britannica: Constantine I – Commitment to Christianity)) He also sponsored ecumenical councils, such as the Council of Nicaea, to settle theological disputes between Christian factions. (Note: In a sense Constantine becomes the embodiment of the righteous king. ... The bishops now have basically federal funding to have sponsored committee meetings so they can try to iron out creeds and get everybody to sign up (Cohen 2015).)

Cross-section of the Church of the Holy Sepulchre showing the traditional site of Calvary and the Tomb of Jesus

Rome's Christianization had a profound impact on Palestine. Churches were built on sites venerated by Christians such as the Church of the Holy Sepulchre in Jerusalem where Jesus was thought to have been crucified and buried, and the Church of the Nativity in Bethlehem where he was thought to have been born. Of the over 140 Christian monasteries built in Palestine in this period, (Note: no fewer than 140 Byzantine monasteries flourished within the relatively small area of Palestine (McGuckin 2008, p. 614)) some were among the oldest in the world, including Mar Saba, which is still in use to this day, Saint George's Monastery in Wadi Qelt, and the Monastery of the Temptation near Jericho. (Note: The churches and monasteries built in the Byzantine era are too numerous to mention. Notable churches include the Church of the Ascension and the New Church of the Theotokos, both in Jerusalem, and Church of Saint George in Burqin. Notable monasteries include Saint Epiphanius' monastery near Eleutheropolis, Tyrannius Rufinus' and Saint Melania the Elder's monastery in Jerusalem, Euthymius' Laura in the Judean desert, Sait Gerasimus' monastery near Jericho, Saint Hilarion's monastery near Gaza, and Saint Theodosius' monastery near Bethlehem.)

Men flocked to live as pious hermits in the Judean wilderness and soon Palestine became a center for eremitic life. (Note: It also became a great centre of the eremitic life (idiorrhythmic monasticism); men flocked from all quarters to become hermits in the Judaean wilderness, which was soon dotted with monasteries (Britannica: Palestine – Roman Palestine).) The ecumenical council in Chalcedon in 451 elevated Jerusalem to a patriarchate and, together with Rome, Alexandria, Antioch, and Constantinpole, it became one of five self-governing centers for Christianity. This elevation greatly boosted the Palestinian church's international prestige. (Note: Membership in the exclusive club of Pentarchy provided the Church of All Palestine with an added international prestige and further clout at home (Masalha 2018, p. 111).)

The Byzantine era was a time of great prosperity and cultural flourishing in Palestine. New areas were cultivated, urbanization increased, and many cities reached their peak populations. Towns increasingly acquired new civic basilicas, porticoed streets with space for shops, and the erection of churches and other religious buildings invigorated their economies. (Note: towns increasingly acquired new civic basilicas and porticoed streets with spaces for shops. ... a vigorous boost from the erection of many churches and other religious buildings (Lewin 2005, p. 41).) The total population of Palestine may have exceeded one and a half million, its highest ever until the twentieth century.

Caesarea and Gaza became two of the most important centers of learning in the whole Mediterranean region, superseding and replacing those of Alexandria and Athens. (Note: in effect, Caesarea-Palaestina and Gaza superseded and replaced both Athens and Alexandria as the premier centres of learning for the whole Mediterranean region (Masalha 2018, pp. 40–41).) Eusebius in his topographical work, Onomasticon: On the Place Names in Divine Scripture, attempted to correlate names and places from the biblical narratives with existing localities in Palestine. These works conceptualized the western view of Palestine as a Christian Holy Land. (Note: Jerome and Eusebius, rather than Herodotus' actual history of Palestine which formed the basis of Western religio‑social toponymic memory and the reimagining of Palestine as a Christian Holy Land (Masalha 2018, p. 49))

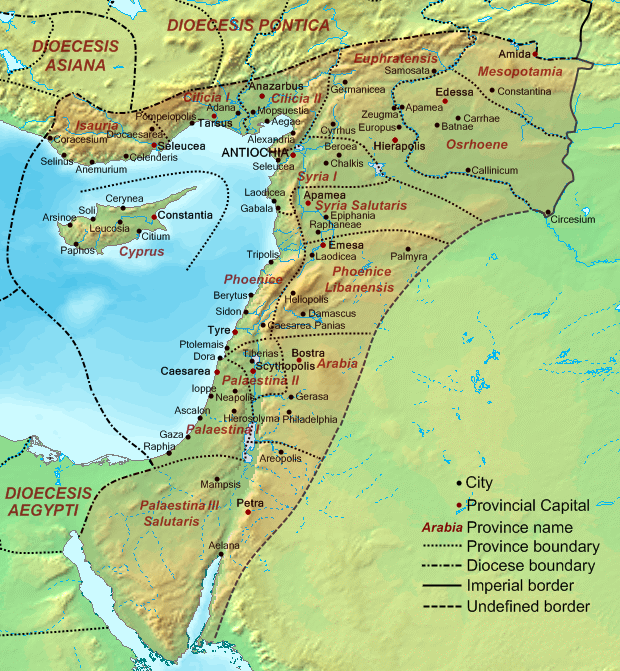
Provinces within Dioceses Orienties c. 400. Borders are approximate.

Starting in the late 3rd century, the Roman provincial administration underwent a series of reforms subdividing the provinces into smaller administrative units. The intent was to circumscribe the ability of provincial governors with strong garrisons to stage revolts against the emperor and to improve efficiency by reducing the area controlled by each governor. Provinces were clustered into regional groups called dioceses. Syria Palaestina became part of Dioceses Orienties, a diocese grouping the near eastern provinces.

In the 4th century, Palestine and neighboring regions were reorganized into the provinces Palaestina Prima, Palaestina Secunda, and Palaestina Tertia or Palaestina Salutaris (First, Second, and Third Palestine). Palaestina Prima with its capital in Caesarea encompassed the central parts of Palestine, including the coastal plain, Judea, and Samaria. Palaestina Secunda had its capital in Scythopolis and included northern Transjordan, the lower Jezreel Valley, the Galilee, and the Golan area. Palaestina Tertia with its capital in Petra included the Negev, southern Transjordan, and parts of the Sinai.

The Christian Ghassanid Arabs were the largest Arab group in Palestine. Starting in the third century, they migrated from South Arabia and settled in Palaestina Secunda and Palaestina Tertia, where they created two client kingdoms that served as the Byzantines' buffer zones. The Ghassanids were a source for troops for the Byzantines and fought with them against the Persians and their allies, the Arab Lakhmids. (Note: After settling in Palaestina Tertia and Palaestina Secunda, the Ghassanids created client (buffer) states ... and fought alongside the Byzantines against the Persian Sassanids and Arab Lakhmid tribes of southern Iraq. ... the Ghassanid Arabs, who acted as a buffer zone and a source of troops for the Byzantine army and controlled (Masalha 2018, pp. 137–140))

In 106, the Romans annexed the territory of the Nabataean client kingdom into the province of Arabia Petraea, apparently without bloodshed, but the Nabataeans, who controlled many important trade routes, continued to prosper. (Note: Although Emperor Trajan defeated the Nabataeans ... the culture did not diminish until changing political ties and economic disruptions moved trade routes away from Petra (Lawler 2011, p. 220).) The incorporation of the Nabataean kingdom began a slow process of hellenization and after the fourth century Greek replaced Aramaic for formal purposes. (Note: Greek eventually replaced Aramaic as an official idiom for bureaucracy after the fourth century C.E (Gzella 2015, p. 242).) Most Nabataeans probably converted to Christianity. (Note: And for the many Nabataeans (probably most) who became Christians, the language of their liturgy was neither Arabic nor Aramaic but the less familiar Greek (Taylor 2002, p. 213).)

In the late 5th and early 6th century, the Samaritans staged several revolts. The first occurred in 484 and required considerable force to put down. (Note: Little is known about this uprising. Reinhard Pummer characterizes the events as two riots – one in Neapolis and one in Caesarea – rather than an uprising, but acknowledges that the majority of sources speak of it as a revolt (Pummer 2016, p. 139).) The Samaritans' synagogue on Mt. Gerizim was replaced with a church as punishment. Another uprising took place in 529 when the Samaritans attacked Christians and Jews and burned estates and churches. The revolt was crushed by the Byzantines aided by Christian Ghassanid Arabs, who took thousands of Samaritans as slaves. (Note: It will be remembered that in the suppression of the dangerous Samaritan revolt that broke out in Palestine in 529, it was the Arab Ghassanid phylarch Arethas, Abu Karib, or both that finally crushed the revolt mercilessly and, captured, according to the chronographer, twenty thousand Samaritans, who were sold as slaves (Shahid 2002, p. 364)) A third revolt erupted in 556. This time, Jews and Samaritans joined forces against the Christians. Little is known about these revolts, but the probable cause for them was the Byzantines' discrimination against non-Christians. The rebellions and the authorities anti-Samaritan policies caused the Samaritans' numbers to dwindle and contributed to solidifying Christian dominance in Palestine.

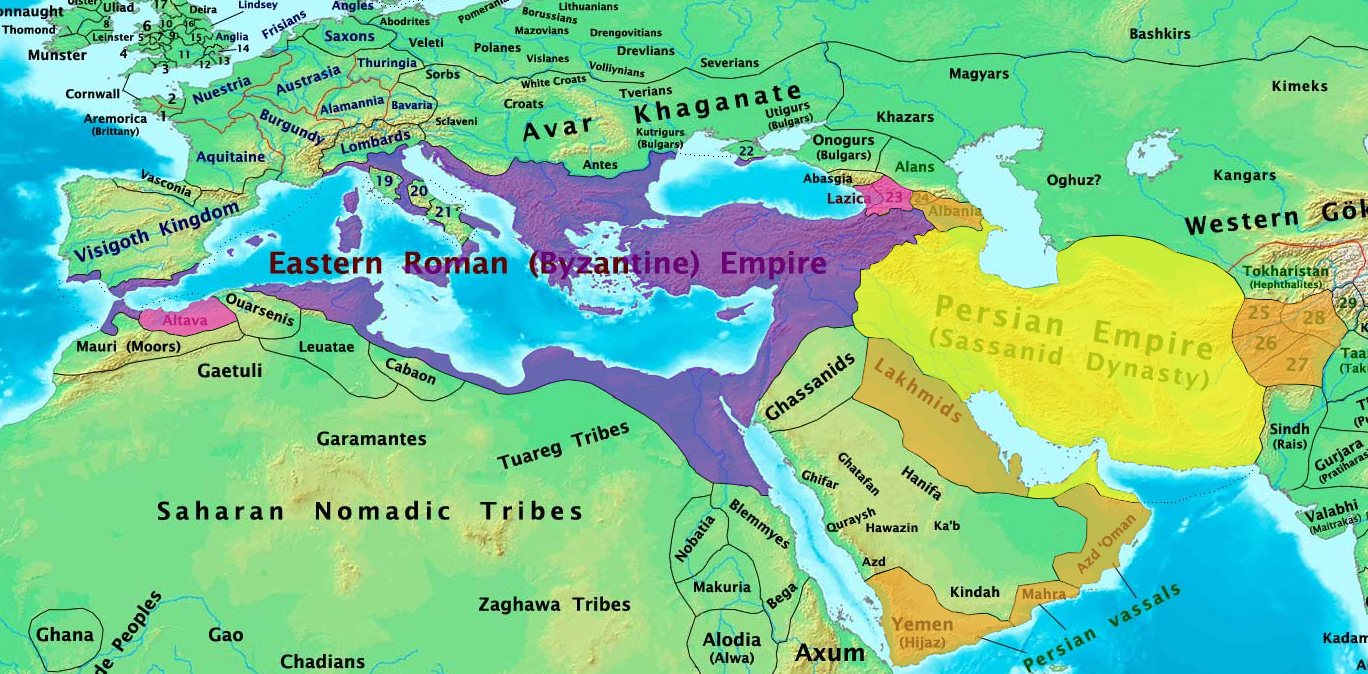
The Byzantine and the Persian Empire in 600

In 602, the final war between the Byzantine Empire and its eastern rival the Persian Empire (Sasanid Empire) broke out. In 613 the Persians invaded the Levant and the Jews revolted against the Byzantines, hoping to secure autonomy for Jerusalem. The following year Persian-Jewish forces captured Caesarea and Jerusalem, destroying its churches, massacring its Christian population, and taking the True Cross and other relics as trophies. The Roman emperor Heraclius made a successful counter-offensive and by 627/8 he was advancing into the Persian heartland.

The Persians sued for peace and had to return the Roman provinces they had captured and the stolen relics. In March 629, Heraclius triumphantly returned the True Cross to Jerusalem. Heraclius had promised the Jews pardon for their earlier treachery but the Christians had not forgotten the Jews' atrocities. At their insistence, Heraclius expelled the Jews from Jerusalem and had those involved in the uprising executed.

Although the Romans had soundly defeated their nemesis, the continued warfare had taken its toll and paved the way for the Arabian conquest a decade later.

== Early Muslim period ==
The expansion of the caliphate under the Umayyads.
Expansion under Muhammad, 622–632
Expansion during the Rashidun Caliphate, 632–661

A map of Bilad al-Sham (Syria) and its provinces

Between 636 and 640, the Muslim armies of the second Islamic caliph Umar conquered Palestine. (Note: The decisive battle that delivered Palestine to the Muslims took place on 20 August 636. Only Jerusalem and Caesarea held out, the former until 638, when it surrendered to the Muslims, and the latter until October 640. Palestine, and indeed all of Syria, was then in Muslim hands (Britannica: Palestine – Roman Palestine).) (Note: See Battle of Yarmouk, Siege of Jerusalem (636–637), Battle of Dathin, and Umar's Assurance for details.) Under Islamic rule, Christians, Jews and Samaritans were protected as fellow Abrahamic monotheists or "peoples of the Book" and allowed to practice their religions in peace. The Muslims also lifted the Romans' centuries-long ban on Jews in Jerusalem.

The Muslims organized the territory of the Byzantine Dioceses Orientes (Syria) into five military districts, or provinces (jund, pl. ajnad). (Note: At first there were four districts, but a fifth, Jund Qinnasrin in the north was added in about 680 (Hawting 2000, p. 38).) (Note: Later, about 680, a fifth district was added, Qinnasrin in the north (Hawting 2000, p. 38)) The territory of Palaestina Prima and Palaestina Tertia became Jund Filastin and stretched from Aqaba in the south to the lower Galilee in the north and from Arish in the west to Jericho in the east. (Note: For several centuries Aylah, the present‑day Jordanian port city of al-'Aqabah on the Red Sea, was part of the Islamic administrative province of Jund Filastin (Masalha 2018, pp. 158–160)) The Tulunids later expanded the borders of the province eastwards and southwards to include regions in modern-day southern Jordan and north-western Saudi Arabia. (Note: It was expanded further by the Tulunids, ... The province of Filastin was enlarged ... eastwards and southwards, at the expense of Jund Dimashq, to include Bilad al‑Sharat, ... in modern‑day southern Jordan and north‑western Saudi Arabia (Salibi 1993: 18‒20; le Strange 1890: 28) (Masalha 2018, p. 169).) The newly founded city Ramla became Jund Filastin's administrative capital and most important city. Jund al-Urdunn corresponded with Palaestina Secunda, covering most of the Galilee, the western part of Peraea in Transjordan, and the coastal cities Acre and Sur (Tyre). Tabariyyah (Tiberias) replaced Scythopolis as the province's capital.

Throughout the period, Palestine was among the most prosperous and fertile provinces of the caliphate. Palestine's wealth derived from its strategic location as a hub for international trade, the influx of pilgrims, its excellent agricultural produce, and from a number of local crafts. Products manufactured or traded in Palestine included building materials from marble and white-stone quarries, spices, soaps, olive oil, sugar, indigo, Dead Sea salts, and silk. Palestinian Jews were expert glassmakers whose wares became known as "Jewish glass" in Europe. Palestine was also known for its book production and scribal work.

The Muslims invested much effort in developing a fleet and in restoring seaports, creating shipyards, fortifying coastal cities, and in establishing naval bases in Palestine. Acre became their chief naval base from which a fleet set out to conquer Cyprus in 647. Jaffa came to replace Caesarea as Palestine's main port due to its proximity with Ramla.

Though Palestine was now under Muslim control, the Christian world's affection for the Holy Land continued to grow. Christian kings made generous donations to Jerusalem's holy sites, (Note: For example, around the turn of the 9th century, the Frankish king Charlemagne founded a hostel, a library, and a church for pilgrims coming to Jerusalem.) and helped facilitate the ever increasing pilgrimage traffic. (Note: For example, in the Great German Pilgrimage of 1064–65 between seven and twelve thousand German pilgrims descended upon the Holy Land, by far the most important pilgrimage of its day.) Pilgrims ventured for the adventure, but also to expiate sin. (Note: the Cluniac Reforms popularized pilgrimage to the Holy Sites as a means to expiate sin (Tejirian & Spector Simon 2012, p. 26)) Many pilgrims were attacked by highwaymen which would later be cited by the Crusaders as a reason to "liberate" Jerusalem from the Muslims.

=== Umayyad Caliphate ===
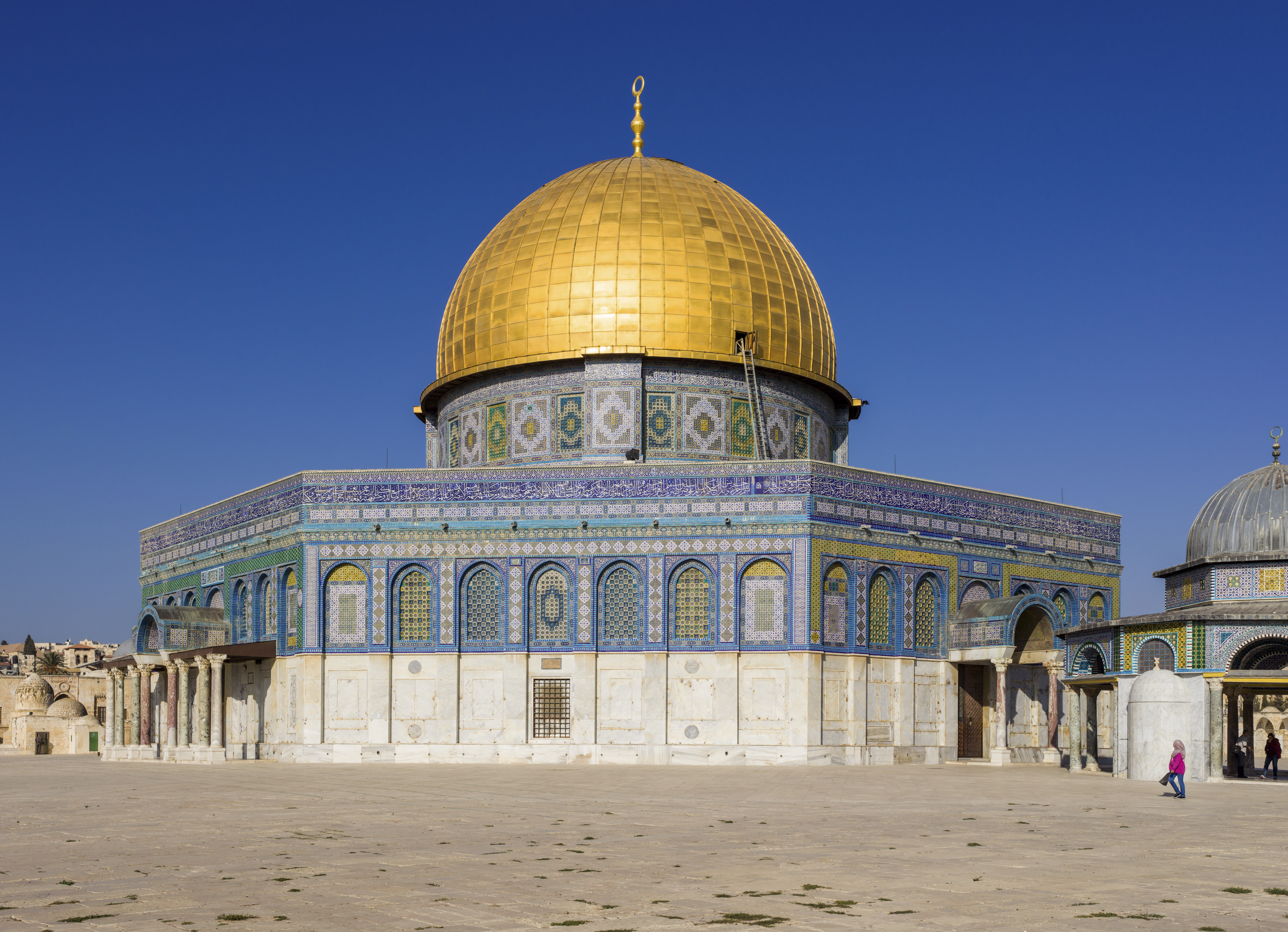
The Dome of the Rock

In 656 the Rashidun caliph Uthman was assassinated leading to the caliphate's first civil war (fitna). The war ended in 661 with the Umayyads becoming the caliphate's ruling dynasty. (Note: Mu'awiya became caliph and founder of the Umayyad dynasty as a result of the events of a period of about five years, between 656 and 661, during which the Arabs were divided into several camps each hostile to the others. ... Muslim tradition knows this period as the Fitna ("time of trial") (Hawting 2002, p. 24)) The first Umayyad caliph, Mu'awiya I, held his accession ceremony in Jerusalem. The Umayyads moved the caliphate's capital from Kufa to Damascus, where they enjoyed strong tribal support. The religious significance of nearby Jerusalem and the fact that in Syria, unlike in Iraq and Egypt, Arabs and non-Arabs lived together may also have played a role.

The Umayyad caliph Abd al-Malik (r. 685–705) and his son al-Walid I (r. 705–715) built two important Islamic religious buildings on the Temple Mount in Jerusalem; the al-Jami'a al-Aqsa (Note: According to an account from later centuries, the Caliph Umar was led to the Temple Mount reluctantly by the Christian patriarch Sophronius. Umar found it covered with rubbish, but the sacred Rock was found with the help of a converted Jew, Ka'b al-Ahbar. Al-Ahbar advised Umar to build a mosque to the north of the rock, so that worshippers would face both the rock and Mecca, but instead Umar chose to build it to the south of the rock. The first known eyewitness testimony of the mosque the pilgrim Arculf's from about 670, recorded by Adomnán as follows: "A square prayer house which they [the Muslims] built in a crude form, placing wooden boards and broad beams on some ruins. It is said that the building can contain three thousand persons.") and the Dome of the Rock. Contrary to common belief, the Dome is not a mosque and its original function and significance is uncertain. The Dome remains the oldest extant Islamic monument in the world. Abd al-Malik paid special attention to Palestine due to Jerusalem's religious centrality and its critical position as a transit zone between Syria and Egypt and built and repaired the roads connecting Damascus with Palestine and Jerusalem to its eastern and western hinterlands, as evidenced by seven milestones found throughout the region. (Note: The milestones, all containing inscriptions crediting Abd al-Malik for the road works, were found, from north to south, in or near Fiq, Samakh, St. George's Monastery of Wadi Qelt, Khan al-Hathrura, Bab al-Wad and Abu Ghosh. The milestone found in Samakh dates to 692, the two milestones at Fiq both date to 704 and the remaining milestones are undated. The fragment of an eighth milestone, likely produced soon after Abd al-Malik's death, was found at Ein Hemed, immediately west of Abu Ghosh.) Al-Walid's successor, Sulayman ibn Abd al-Malik (r. 715–717), ruled from Palestine, where he had long been governor and founded the city of Ramla, which remained the region's administrative center until the Crusader conquest in 1099.

The centuries-long feud between the Arab tribal confederations the Qays and the Yaman that began under the Umayyads came to color Palestine's history. (Note: As yet the feud between the Qays and Yaman which was to plague Syria for so many centuries was not a major problem (Kennedy 2004, p. 86).) (Note: One of the prominent tribes in Yaman were the Quda'a. The Qays were commonly known as Mudar.) The early caliphs would seek support from one of these groups and would consequently be opposed by the other, often resulting in warfare. The pretender standing victorious in these wars would reward their confederation with governorships in the provinces and other privileges. (Note: the conflict was between two factions, based on tribal loyalties, which sought to control access to military power and the privileges that went with it. The prizes were the favour of the ruling caliph and the lucrative governorships in the provinces (Kennedy 2004, p. 105).) The casualties inflicted during the wars would also have to be avenged, causing further bloodshed. Later caliphs tried to curb the feud, but it was almost impossible to stop; the best that they could do was to keep it under control by threats and themselves paying the blood-money demanded to prevent further retaliation.

In 744, Palestinian tribes rebelled against the caliph. The caliph appeased the tribes by promising them various offices and other benefits. While it ended the rebellion, the tribes remained antagonistic towards the caliph. Another uprising broke out in Syria in 745 after Marwan II had become the new caliph and was soon joined by the Palestinian tribes. (Note: For details, see Third Fitna.) Marwan II quelled the uprising but another erupted which required considerable bloodshed to stamp out. Marwan II destroyed the city walls of Jerusalem, Damascus, and other cities as punishment.

=== Abbasid Caliphate ===
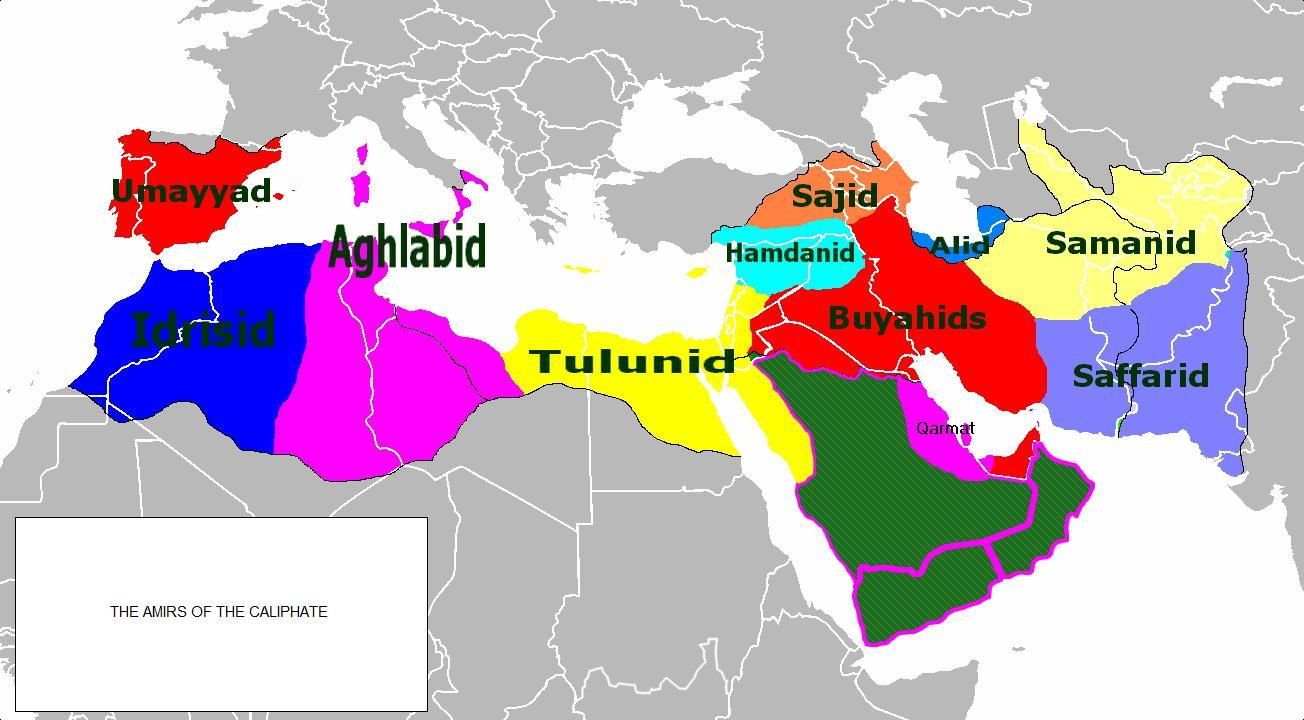
De facto independent emirates after the Abbasids lost their military dominance c. 950

With the overthrow of the Umayyads in a 750 revolution by the Abbasids, who had their power base in Persia, the caliphate's capital was moved to Baghdad in 762. This change meant that Palestine lost its central position and became a province in the caliphate's periphery whose problems weren't tended to very carefully. Though it did not cause a decline in the region, it ended the Umayyads' extravagant investments in Palestine. (Note: Although this shift of focus away from Palestine did not cause an immediate decline in the region, it did put an end to the extravagant investments that characterized Umayyad rule (Burke & Peilstocker 2011, p. 114).) The prestige of the tribes in Syria, including Palestine, many of whom had supported the Umayyads also diminished and they no longer influenced the caliphate's political affairs – only its rebellions. (Note: The most drastic and basic change effected by this revolution throughout the caliphate-the decline of the Arab tribes' glory-was strongly felt in Palestine. From that time onwards, after the initial shocks were over, one hears no longer of the tribes participating in its political affairs, but only of their rebellions (Gil 1997, p. 279)) (Note: There is some debate on how the Abbasids rule affected Syria. Paul M. Cobb writes: "However unhappy some Syrians may have been, the large-scale political breakdown and socio-economic collapse of 'Abbasid Syria that modern scholarship has posited for so long has no historical basis. Indeed, in certain cases, contention – especially interelite competition like that of Syria's ashraf – can be seen as a kind of backhanded compliment to the success of the 'Abbasid state-building and an affirmation of its legitimacy. Political life in 'Abbasid Syria was certainly different from that under the Umayyads, but, all things considered, it showed little change for the worse." (Cobb 2001, p. 128))

Rebellions and other disturbances constantly troubled the Abbasids' rule. In the 790s, the Qays-Yaman feud resulted in several wars in Palestine. One of these, fought in 796 between Qaysi rebels on one side, and the Yamani and Abbasid regime on the other, required substantial force to quell. Another uprising broke out in the 840s when the Yaman Al-Mubarqa roused peasants and tribesmen against the Abbasid regime. These outbursts of violence were very destructive and the rebels caused great havoc, looted monasteries, and devastated many cities. At times, Palestine was a lawless land.

Towards the end of the 9th century, the Abbasids began to lose control of their western provinces, following a period of internal instability. (Note: During the second half of the 9th century, however, signs of internal decay began to appear in the 'Abbāsid empire. Petty states, and some indeed not so petty, emerged in different parts of the realm (Britannica: Palestine – Roman Palestine).) In 873, the governor of Egypt, Ahmad Ibn Tulun, declared independence and founded the Tulunid dynasty. A few years later, he occupied Syria. The Tulunids ended the persecution of Christians and prompted the renovation of churches in Jerusalem. The port of Acre was also renovated. The Tulunids' rule was short-lived, however, and by 906 the Abbasids had retaken Palestine. Their control lasted until 939 when they granted Muhammad ibn Tughj al-Ikhshid, the governor of Egypt and Palestine, autonomous control over his domain. (Note: In 327/939, Muhammad ibn Tughj obtained from the Caliph al-Radi confirmation of his appointment as military and fiscal governor, receiving the laqab of al-Ikhshid or "servant," a princely title from Farghana. After three decades of costly disorders in an Egypt administered by appointed governors, the caliphate had reached the conclusion that only an autonomous prince who, along with his descendants, ..., would be capable of defending it effectively against the Fatimids (Bianquis 1998, p. 112).) He established the Ikshidid dynasty whose rule was marked by acts of persecution against Christians, sometimes aided by local Jews. In 937, the Church of the Resurrection was torched and robbed and in 966 severe anti-Christian riots occurred in Jerusalem. Anarchy reigned after the Ikhshidid regent died in 968. Many welcomed the Fatimid Caliphate's conquest of the Ikhshid state the following year. (Note: Finally, in 969, under the caliph al-Muʿizz, the first stage in the advance to the East was completed. Fāṭimid troops conquered the Nile Valley and advanced across Sinai into Palestine and southern Syria (Britannica: Fatimid Dynasty).)

=== Fatimid Caliphate ===
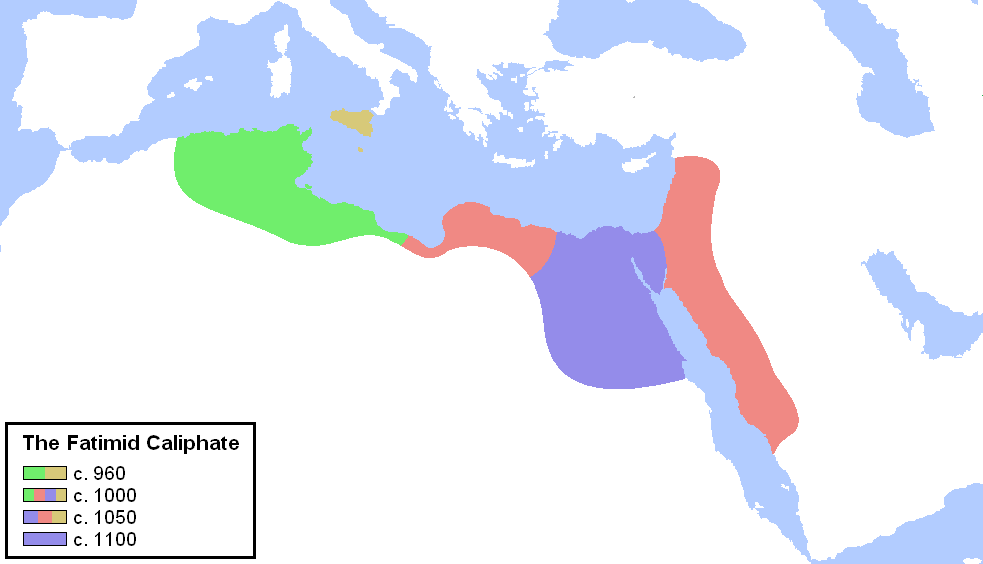
The Fatimid Caliphate at its greatest extent

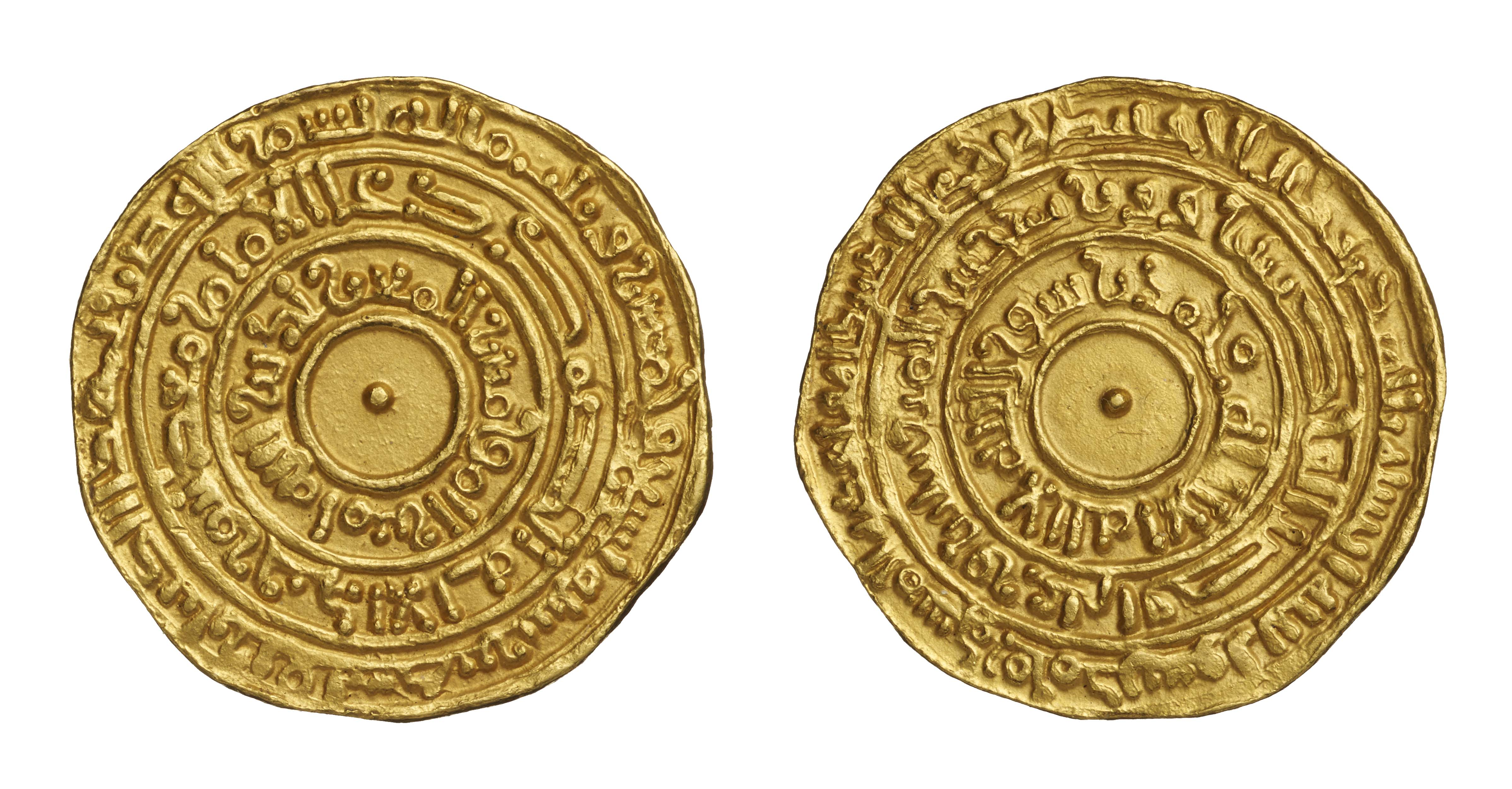
A gold dinar minted in Palestine in 969–970

The Fatimids established a caliphate based in North Africa in the early 10th century. In 969, they conquered the Ikshidid's territory and established precarious control over Palestine. Their arrival marked the beginning of six decades of almost uninterrupted and highly destructive warfare in Palestine between them and their many enemies, the Byzantines, the Qarmatians, Bedouin tribes, and even infighting between Berber and Turkic factions within the Fatimid army. Of note are the Bedouins, led by the Jarrahids, who in 977–981/2, in 1011–1013, and in 1024–1029, gained de facto independent rule over most of Palestine, either by rebelling or by acquiring the Caliph's reluctant consent. The Bedouins also enjoyed almost unlimited power in Palestine in 997–1010. (Note: For a period of some fourteen years (997–1010), the Banu Jarrah enjoyed almost unlimited power in Palestine, evidently with the consent of Caliph al-Hakim (Gil 1997, p. 370).) The Bedouins' rule, plunder and many atrocities exacted a heavy toll on Palestine. (Note: The 1020s were particularly harrowing. The outrages perpetrated by the Bedouins "were unlike anything experienced in the countries of Islam since its inception" (Geniza letter, in Mann, Jews in Egypt, ii, 181, l. 22). The details reported in the Geniza letters are revolting ... the population must have considerably shrunk, possibly an outcome of the catastrophic tribulations by the Bedouins in the 1020 (Goitein & Grabar 2007, pp. 232–234))

In 1009, in a spate of religious persecution, Caliph Al-Hakim bi-Amr Allah ordered the demolition of all churches and synagogues in the empire, including the Church of the Holy Sepulchre. News of the demolition shocked and enraged Christian Europe which blamed the Jews. Al-Hakim also forced Christians and Jews to wear a distinctive dress. His anti-Christian policies may have been intended to mollify critics of his father's liberal attitude towards dhimmi or to put pressure on the Byzantines. His successor permitted the holy church to be rebuilt, but the repression against non-Muslims continued.

In the 11th century, the Muslim Turkic Seljuk Empire invaded West Asia and both the Byzantines and the caliphates suffered territorial losses. (Note: For details see Battle of Manzikert.) Baghdad fell in 1055, and Palestine in 1071–1073. Thus, the period of relative calm ended and Palestine again became the scene of anarchy, internal wars among the Turks themselves and between them and their enemies. The Turkic rule was one of slaughter, vandalism, and economic hardship. (Note: By and large, however, the Turcoman period, which lasted less than thirty years, was one of slaughter and vandalism, of economic hardship and the uprooting of populations (Gil 1997, p. 420).) In 1077, an uprising against the unpopular Seljuk rule spread in Palestine which was quashed with an iron fist. The Seljuks slaughtered the people of Jerusalem, despite having promised them pardon, and annihilated Gaza, Ramla, and Jaffa. In 1098, the Fatimids recaptured Jerusalem from the Seljuks.

In addition to the warring, three major earthquakes hit Palestine in the 11th century: in 1015, in 1033, and 1068. The last one virtually demolished Ramla and killed some 15,000 inhabitants.

== Crusader period ==
The Kingdom of Jerusalem and the Crusader states with their strongholds in the Holy Land at their height, between the First and the Second Crusade (1135)

Generally, the Crusades (1095–1291) refer to the European Christian campaigns in the Holy Land sponsored by the Papacy against Muslims in order to reconquer the region of Palestine. While Palestine was a far away land, pilgrimage had nurtured a special bond between the region and the Europeans who considered it a holy land. Impediments to the pilgrimage traffic to Palestine, of which there were many in the late 11th century, were cause for serious concern. Meanwhile, a doctrine of holy war developed under which warfare to aid Christians or to defend Christianity was seen as virtuous. Additionally, relations between the Eastern and Western branches of Christianity – which had seen chilly schisms – were improving. These factors meant that when the Byzantines called for help against the Muslims, the western Europeans obliged and launched the first of a number of military expeditions, known as "the Crusades".

The First Crusade captured the entire eastern Mediterranean coast, from modern-day Turkey in the north to the Sinai in the south. (Note: See Siege of Jerusalem (1099) and Battle of Ascalon for details.) Crusader states were organized in the captured territory, one of which was the Kingdom of Jerusalem, founded in 1100, encompassing most of Palestine and modern-day Lebanon. More crusades followed as the Latins and the Muslims battled for control over Palestine.

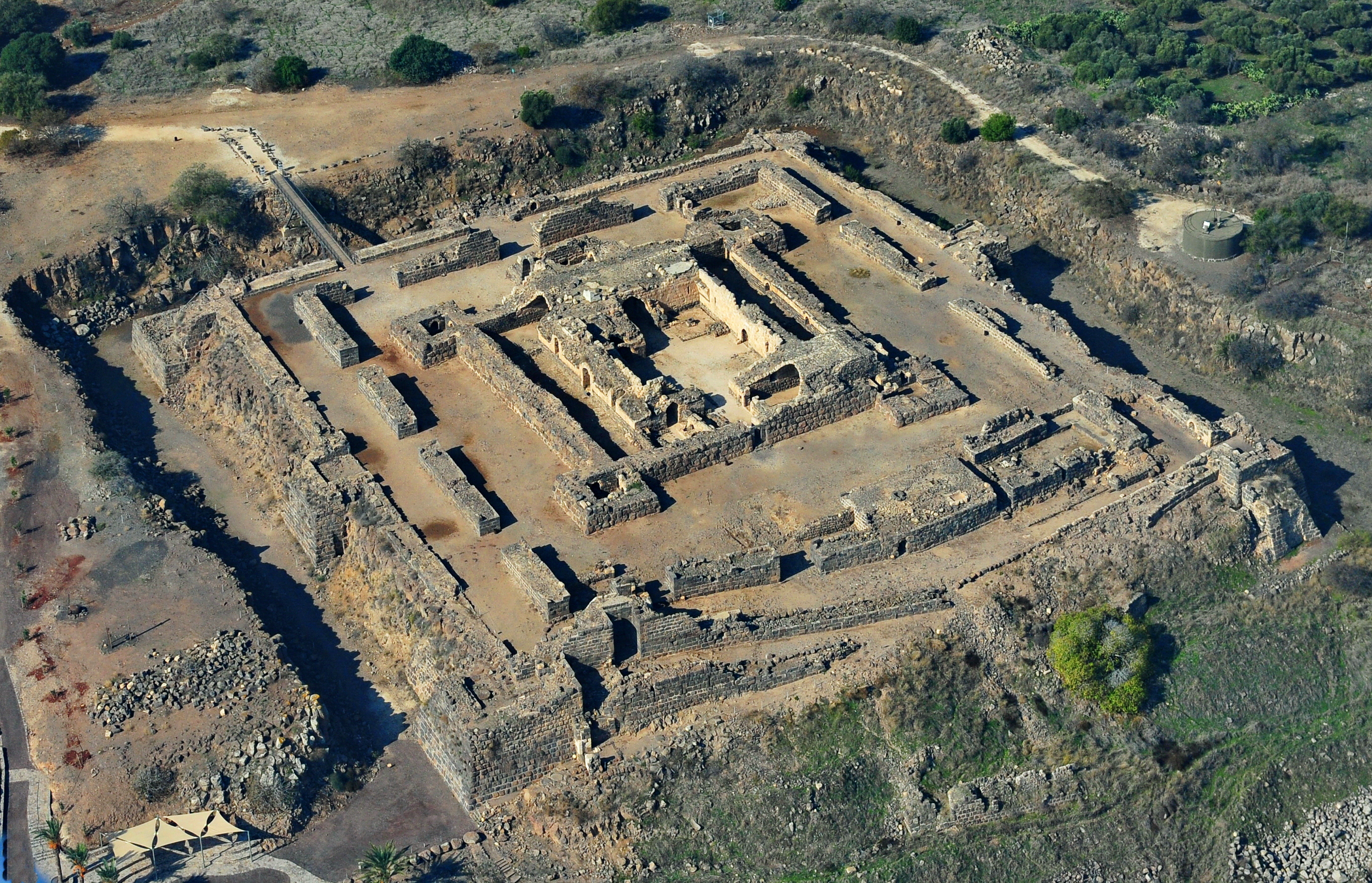
Belvoir Castle, also known as the Kochav HaYarden, built by the Knights Hospitaller starting in 1168

In 1187, Palestine, including Jerusalem, was captured by the Egyptian-based Ayyubid dynasty. (Note: See Battle of Hattin and Siege of Jerusalem (1187) for details.) However, the Ayyubids failed to take Tyre and the crusader states in the north. This allowed the crusaders to launch another crusade that by 1192 had occupied most of the Palestinian coast down to Jaffa, but, crucially, it failed to retake Jerusalem. Negotiations between the Latins and the Ayyubids resulted in a treaty, securing unfettered access to the Church of the Holy Sepulchre in Jerusalem for Christian pilgrims, but the holy city would remain in Ayyubid hands and the True Cross would not be returned.

This state of affairs, with the Kingdom of Jerusalem reduced to a sliver of coastal land, would remain for most of the 13th century. Jerusalem, Bethlehem, and Nazareth, as well as a thin strip of land connecting the cities to the coast, was awarded the kingdom in 1229 following negotiations that concluded the Sixth Crusade. (Note: In return for a ten-year truce between the kingdom of Jerusalem and the Muslims, al-Kamil would give to Frederick Jerusalem, Bethlehem, and Nazareth, as well as a thin strip of land connecting the holy sites to the coast (Madden 2014, pp. 150–151).) Ten years earlier, the Ayyubids had destroyed Jerusalem's city walls to prevent the Latins from capturing a fortified city. (Note: Certain that the crusaders would accept the proposal, al-Mu'azzam ordered the destruction of the walls of Jerusalem in March 1219 (Madden 2014, p. 141).) In 1244, Jerusalem was captured by Khwarizmians who went on to burn churches and to massacre the Christian population. The shock of the atrocities goaded the Latins into action. The Latin nobility pooled all the resources they had together into the largest field army amassed in the East since the late 12 century. (Note: Pooling the resources of the Frankish nobility and the Military Orders, the Christians managed to muster around two thousand knights and perhaps a further 10,000 infantrymen. This host–the largest field army amassed in the East since the Third Crusade–represented the Latin kingdom's full fighting manpower (Asbridge 2010, p. 474).) Strengthened by troops from dissident Muslim rulers, they met the Ayyubid–Khwarizmian coalition at the Battle of La Forbie north-east of Gaza. There, they suffered a disastrous defeat, marking the end of Latin influence in southern and central Palestine. (Note: On 18 October 1244 they launched an attack and battle was joined on the sandy plains near the village of La Forbie (north-east of Gaza). For the Franks and their allies, the mêlée that followed was an unmitigated disaster (Asbridge 2010, pp. 474–475).) In 1291, the Mamluks destroyed Acre, the Kingdom of Jerusalem's capital and last stronghold. (Note: Overall the Latin Kingdom lasted in Palestine nearly 200 years, from 1099 until 1291, when the last stronghold and capital, Acre, was destroyed by the Mamluks (Masalha 2018, p. 167).)

The Europeans interest in crusading gradually waned over time. New ideas about what a "good Christian life" meant emerged and seeking redemption for sins through action became less central. To boot, "heretical" beliefs within Europe became a major issue for Latin Christianity, taking focus away from Palestine.

Military orders made up of pious knights, combining monastic discipline with martial skill, were organized in the crusader states. The duties of these were to defend strategic areas and to serve in the crusader armies. The most famous orders was the Knights Templar, named after their headquarter in the al-Aqsa mosque which they called the Temple of Solomon. The nearby Dome of the Rock was used as a church. Another famous order were the Hospitallers, renowned for caring for the poor and sick. In Palestine, where crusades came and went, the orders provided stability otherwise impossible to maintain.

Under the Crusader rule, fortifications, castles, towers and fortified villages were built, rebuilt and renovated across Palestine largely in rural areas. A notable urban remnant of the Crusader architecture of this era is found in Acre's old city.

During the period of Crusader control, it has been estimated that Palestine had only 1,000 poor Jewish families. (Note: Frank Heynick, commenting on Maimonides's decision not to settle there a century later (Heynick 2002, p. 103).) Jews fought alongside the Muslims against the Crusaders in Jerusalem in 1099 and Haifa in 1100.

== Ayyubid and Mamluk periods ==
Jerusalem under the Ayyubid dynasty after the death of Saladin, 1193

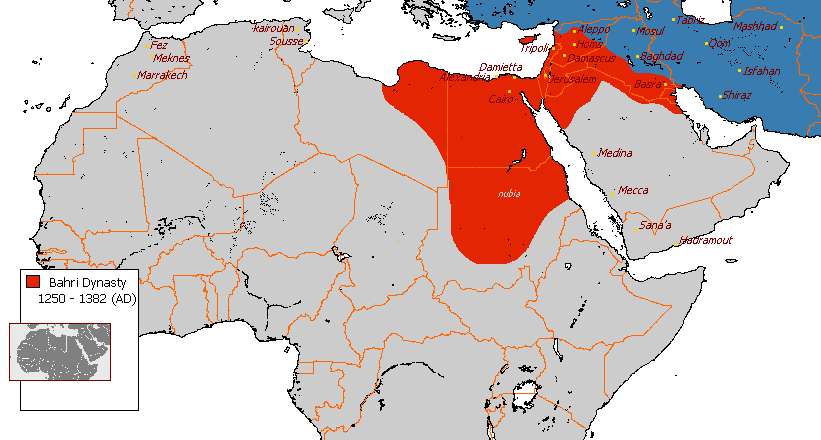
The Bahri Mamluk dynasty 1250–1382

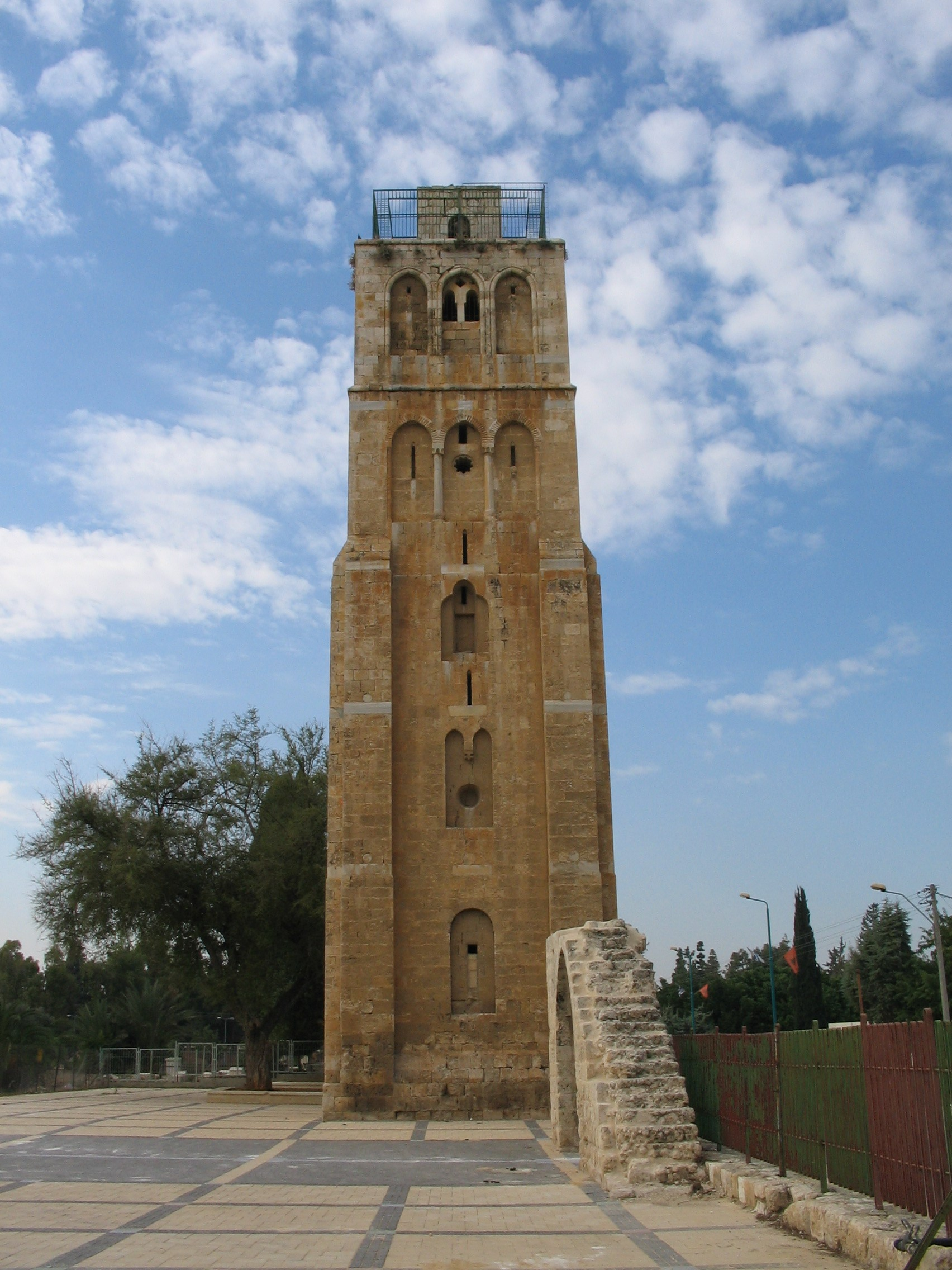
Tower of Ramla, constructed in 1318

The Ayyubids allowed Jewish and Orthodox Christian settlement in the region and the Haram al-Sharif and the Dome of the Rock were restored to Muslim worship. The Mosque of Omar was built by Saladin outside the Church of the Holy Sepulchre. It commemorated the Rashidun caliph Umar's decision to pray outside the Church so as not to set a precedent and thereby endanger its status as a Christian site.

The Mamluk Sultanate was indirectly created in Egypt as a result of the Seventh Crusade, which had been launched in reaction to the 1244 destruction of Jerusalem. The crusade failed after Louis IX of France was defeated and captured by the Ayyubid sultan al-Muazzam Turanshah at the Battle of Fariskur in 1250. Turanshah was killed by his Mamluks a month after the battle, and his stepmother Shajar al-Durr became sultana of Egypt; she married the Mamluk Aybak and he served as Atabeg. The Ayyubids relocated to Damascus, where they continued to control Palestine for a further decade.

In the late 13th century, Palestine and Syria became the primary front against the fast-expanding Mongol Empire, whose army reached Palestine for the first time in 1260, beginning with the Mongol raids into Palestine under Nestorian Christian general Kitbuqa. Mongol leader Hulegu Khan sent a message to Louis IX of France that Jerusalem had been remitted to the Christians under the Franco-Mongol alliance; however, shortly thereafter, he had to return to Mongolia following the death of Möngke Khan, leaving Kitbuqa and a reduced army. Kitbuqa then engaged with the Mamluks under Baybars in the pivotal Battle of Ain Jalut in the Jezreel Valley. The Mamluks' decisive victory in Palestine established a high-water mark for the Mongol conquests. The Mongols were, however, able to engage into some further brief raids in 1300 under Ghazan and Mulay, reaching as far as Gaza. Jerusalem was held by the Mongols for four months (see Ninth Crusade).

The Mamluks, continuing the policy of the Ayyubids, made the strategic decision to destroy the coastal area and to bring desolation to many of its cities, from Tyre in the north to Gaza in the south. Ports were destroyed and various materials were dumped to make them inoperable. The goal was to prevent attacks from the sea, given the fear of the return of the Crusaders. This had a long-term effect on those areas, which remained sparsely populated for centuries. The activity in that time concentrated more inland.

Palestine formed a part of the Damascus wilayah (district) under the rule of the Mamluk Sultanate and was divided into three smaller sanjaks (subdivisions) with capitals in Jerusalem, Gaza, and Safed. Due in part to the many conflicts, earthquakes and the Black Death that hit the region during this era, the population is estimated to have dwindled to around 200,000. The Mamluks constructed a "postal road" from Cairo to Damascus that included lodgings for travelers (khans) and bridges, some of which survive to this day (see Jisr Jindas, near Lod). The period also saw the construction of many schools and the renovation of mosques neglected or destroyed during the Crusader period.

In 1377 the major cities of Palestine and Syria revolted following the death of al-Ashraf Sha'ban. The revolt was quelled and a coup d'etat was staged by Barquq in Cairo in 1382, founding the Burji Mamluk dynasty.

Palestine was celebrated by Arab and Muslim writers of the time as the "blessed land of the prophets and Islam's revered leaders". Muslim sanctuaries were "rediscovered" and received many pilgrims. In 1496, Mujir al-Din wrote his history of Palestine known as The Glorious History of Jerusalem and Hebron.

== Ottoman period ==
=== Early Ottoman rule ===
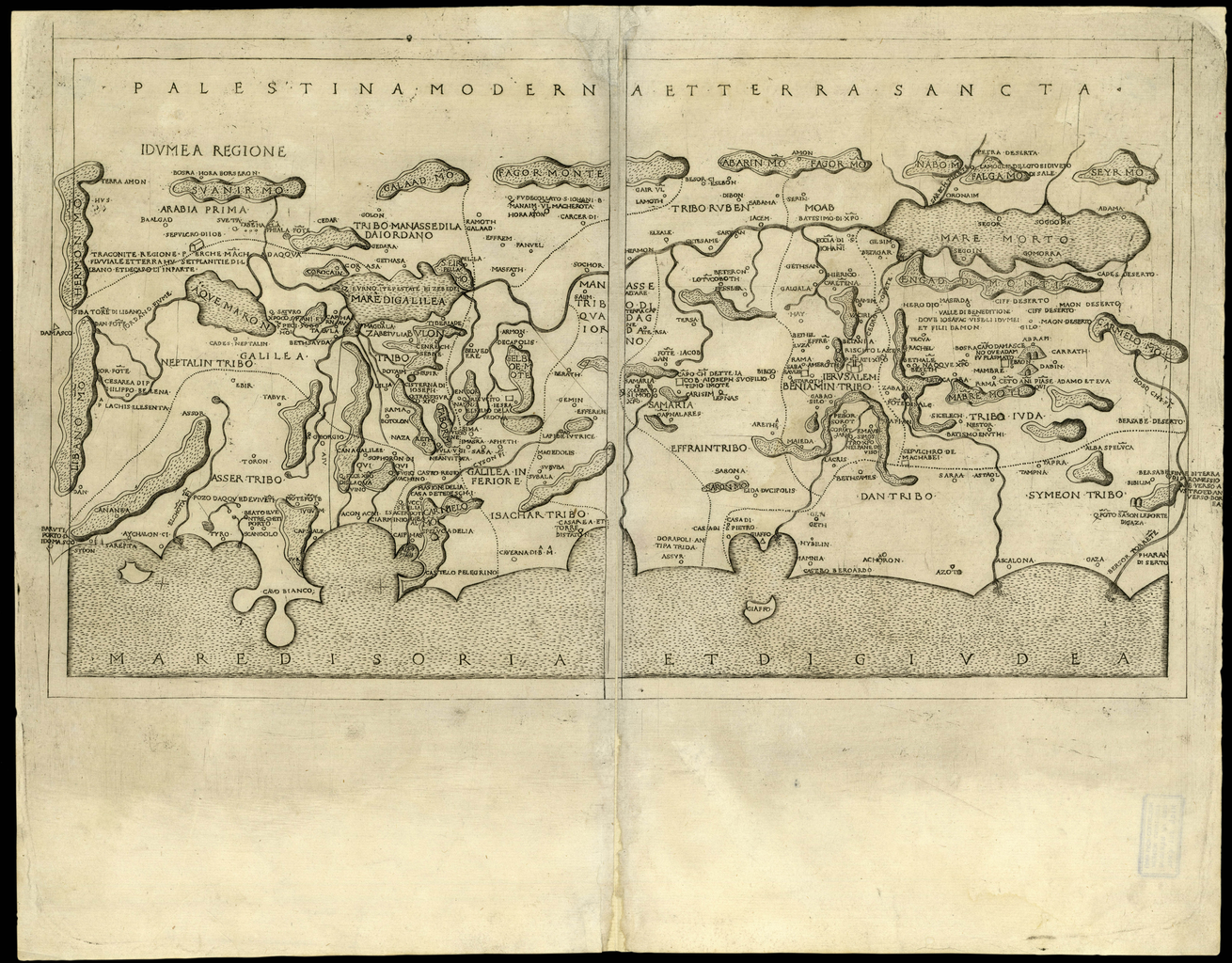
Map of Palestine and the Holy Land published in Florence around 1480 and included in Francesco Berlinghieri's expanded edition of Ptolemy's Geographia.

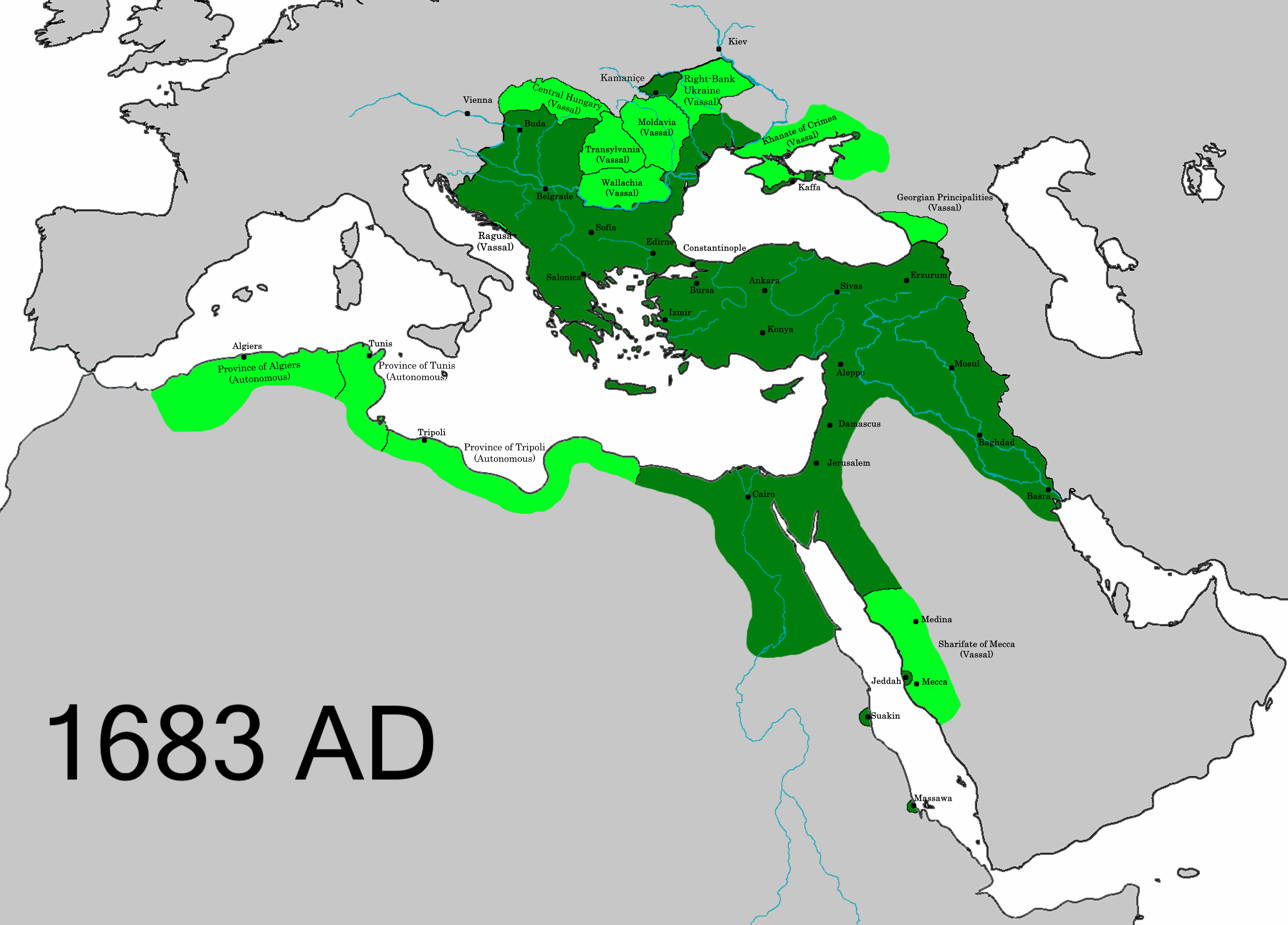
Territories of the Ottoman Empire in 1683, showing Jerusalem

Hostilities between the Mamluks and the Ottoman Turks began in 1486 in a battle for control over western Asia. Following their 1516 victory over the Mamluks at the Battle of Marj Dabiq, the Ottoman conquest of Palestine was relatively swift, with small battles in the Jordan Valley and at Khan Yunis on the route to the Mamluk capital in Egypt, and with minor uprisings in Gaza, Ramla and Safad that were quickly suppressed.

The Mamluks' administrative organisation of Palestine was generally maintained by the Ottomans, with Greater Syria forming an eyalet (province) ruled from Damascus, and the Palestine region within it divided into five sanjaks (provincial districts): Safad, Nablus, Jerusalem, Lajjun and Gaza. Damascus Eyalet was initially ruled by the Istanbul-based Sublime Porte (imperial government), playing a crucial role in maintaining public order and domestic security, collecting taxes, and regulating the economy, religious affairs and social welfare. Most of Palestine's population, estimated to be around 200,000 in the early years of Ottoman rule, lived in villages. The largest cities were Gaza, Safad and Jerusalem, each with a population of around 5,000–6,000.

Ottoman Palestine While the name "Palestine" was no longer the official name of an administrative unit under the Ottomans, as they typically named provinces after their respective capitals, the name remained popular and semi-official, with many examples of its usage in the 16th, 17th and 18th centuries. The 16th-century Jerusalem-based Islamic jurist Sayf al-Islam Abu'l Sa'ud Effendi defined it as an alternative name for Arazi-i Muqaddas (Ottoman Turkish for "the Holy Land"). The 17th-century Ramla-based jurist Khayr al-Din al-Ramli often used "Filastin" in his fatawat (religious edicts) without defining it, although some of his fatawat suggest that it more or less corresponded with the borders of Jund Filastin.

=== Decentralization and emergence of local dynasties ===
By the end of the 16th century, direct Ottoman rule over Damascus Eyalet weakened, partly due to the Jelali revolts and other Anatolian insurrections. Local governing elites emerged in Palestine such as the Ridwan, Farrukh and Turabay dynasties whose families served as the district governors of the Gaza, Nablus, Jerusalem and Lajjun sanjaks. Between the late 16th century and early 18th century, the prestigious post of amir al-hajj (commander of the Hajj caravan) was rotated between the governors of Nablus or Gaza, with the departing amir al-hajj from one of these families entrusting authority over his sanjak to the governor of the neighboring sanjak.

Another local power centre emerged around the Druze emir (prince) of Mount Lebanon, Fakhr-al-Din II, who gained control of Safad Sanjak and was appointed governor of Nablus and mutasallim (chief tax collector) of Gaza in 1622. The Ridwan-Farrukh-Turabay alliance organized to thwart him, tacitly supported by the Sublime Porte who played these local rulers off one another. Fakhr ad-Din was appointed the "Emir of Arabistan" by the Ottomans, giving him official authority over the region between Aleppo and Jerusalem, before he was deposed and hanged a decade later by the Wali of Damascus.

In 1657, the Ottoman authorities launched a military expedition to reassert imperial control over Palestine. The Grand Vizier Köprülü Mehmed Pasha established the Sidon Eyalet in 1660 to separate the Safad Sanjak from the rest of Palestine, weaken the ambitious governors of Damascus and maintain stricter control over the rebellious emirs of Mount Lebanon.

Under the governorship of the Ridwan's Husayn Pasha in the 1640s, Gaza was called the "capital of Palestine" by the French consul of Jerusalem, Chevalier d'Arvieux, and his good relations with France and Palestine's Christian communities were a source of Ottoman consternation. In 1662-3, the Sublime Porte accused Husayn Pasha of incompetence leading the Hajj caravan in order to imprison and execute him. His death led to the gradual unravelling of the Ridwan-Farrukh-Turabay alliance by the late 1670s, though Ridwan rule persisted in Gaza until 1690.

New governors appointed by the Ottoman government failed to maintain relationships with local elites and increased exploitation of the general populace by the Janissaries, subashis and timar holders. Complaints to the Sublime Porte skyrocketed among Muslims, Christians and Jews alike, and many peasants abandoned their villages. There were also official complaints from townspeople over seizures of their property, and from the ulama (Muslim scholarly class) over the Janissaries' disregard for justice and the sanctity of Muslim places of worship, including Al-Aqsa (Haram al-Sharif).

In 1703, the people of Jerusalem, backed by the city's notables and led by the chief of the ashraf families, Muhammad ibn Mustafa al-Husayni, revolted. The home of Jerusalem's qadi, a symbol of imperial authority at that time, was ransacked and his translator killed by rebels. The city was self-governed until an Ottoman siege and internal strife forced al-Husayni and his rebels to withdraw from Jerusalem in October 1705.

Meanwhile, and contrary to the Sublime Porte's intentions, a new class of notables emerged from among the mostly Arab sipahi officers of the 1657 military expedition who originated in other parts of Ottoman Syria, chief among them members of the Nimr family, who settled in Nablus, and were soon followed by the Jarrar and Tuqan families. These sheikhs (chiefs) cultivated close ties with the local population through selling or leasing their timar lands to rural notables, investing in local commerce and property such as soap factories, and intermarrying and partnering with local ashraf and mercantile families. Along with the Mamluk-era Jayyusis, they continued to hold influence in Jabal Nablus until the mid-19th century.

=== Rule of Acre and autonomy of Nablus ===
==== Zaydani period ====
Daher al-Umar's autonomous sheikhdom in 1774

The sheikhs of the Zaydani family were appointed as multazems (tax collectors and local enforcers) of iltizam (tax farms) in parts of the Galilee over the Ma'ani in the mid-17th century, and then over the Shihabi emirs of Mount Lebanon. In 1730, Zaydani sheikh Daher al-Umar was directly appointed by the Wali of Sidon as the multazem of Tiberias, which he soon fortified, along with other Zaydani strongholds such as Deir Hanna, Arraba and Nazareth. Several military confrontations erupted between Daher and the Jarrar clans beginning in 1735 when the former occupied the latter's territory of Nazareth and the Jezreel Valley, which served as trade and transportation hubs.

By 1750, Daher had consolidated control over the entire Galilee, and transferred his headquarters to the port village of Acre, which he renovated and refortified. Acre became the center of an expanding autonomous sheikhdom financed by a monopoly on cotton and other agricultural commodities from Palestine and southern Lebanon established by Daher. Control of cotton and olive oil prices drew great revenues from European merchants, enabling Daher to marshal military resources needed to fend off assaults by the governors of Damascus, and ending the foreign merchants' manipulation of prices and financial exploitation of the local peasantry. Combined with significantly improved general security and social justice, Daher's economic policies made him popular with the local inhabitants, and attracted immigration to Palestine from throughout Ottoman Syria, including large numbers of Jews and Melkite and Greek Orthodox Christians, revitalizing the region's economy. Daher founded modern-day Haifa in 1769.

Daher built alliances with the Russian Empire and Ali Bey of Egypt. Backed by the Russian Navy, Daher, his Lebanese Shia allies and Ali Bey's forces commanded by Ismail Bey and Abu al-Dhahab, invaded Damascus and Sidon. Ali Bey's commanders abruptly withdrew from Damascus after briefly capturing it in June 1771, compelling Daher to withdraw from Sidon shortly thereafter. Uthman Pasha al-Kurji, the Wali of Damascus, renewed his campaign to eliminate Daher, but his forces were routed at Lake Hula in September 1771. By 1774, Daher's rule extended from Gaza to Beirut, including most of Palestine. The year after, however, a coalition of Ottoman forces besieged and killed him at his Acre headquarters. The Ottoman commander Jazzar Pasha subsequently waged a campaign that destroyed Deir Hanna's fort and ended Zaydani rule in the Galilee in 1776.

Although Acre and the Galilee were part of Sidon Eyalet while the rest of Palestine administratively belonged to Damascus, it was the rulers of Acre, beginning with Daher, that dominated Palestine and the southern Syrian districts. Damascus governors typically held office for short periods of time and were often occupied with protecting and leading the Hajj caravan as the office of amir al-hajj had become the responsibility of the Wali of Damascus in 1708, preventing them from asserting their authority over semi-autonomous areas such as the Nablus region. In contrast, Daher established Acre as a virtually autonomous entity, a process seen in other parts of the Ottoman Empire including Egypt, Mount Lebanon and Mosul. Moreover, Acre became the de facto capital of Sidon Eyalet during and after Daher's reign, and like Daher, his successors ruled Acre until their deaths.

==== Jazzari period ====
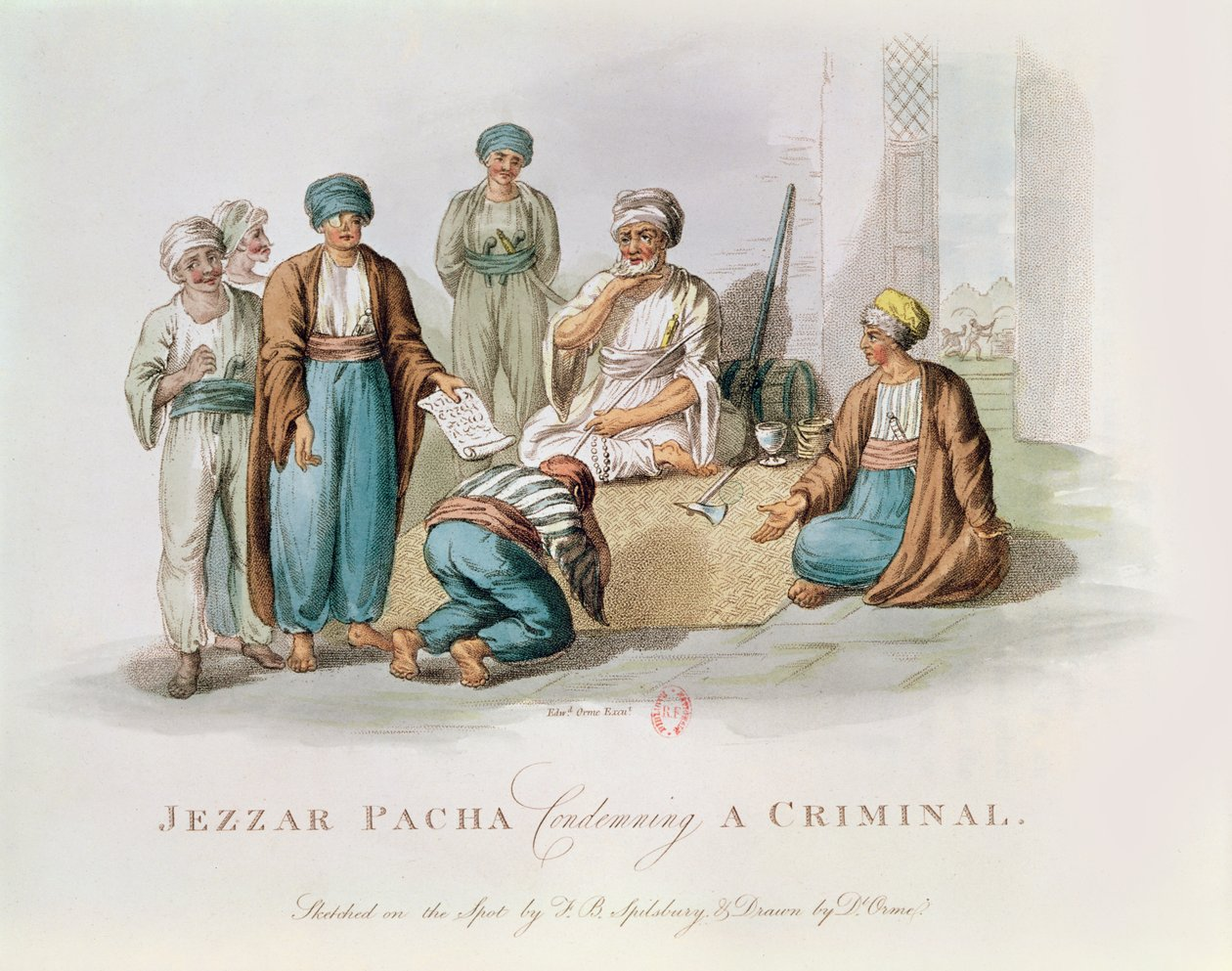
An illustration of Jazzar Pasha's court in Acre, 1800

Jazzar Pasha was appointed Wali of Sidon by the Sublime Porte for his role in uprooting the Zaydani sheikhdom, and extended Ottoman control and his influence throughout the southern half of Ottoman Syria. He built on Daher's cotton monopoly and further strengthened the fortifications of Acre, which was now his base, financing his rule through income generated from the cotton trade, as well as taxes, tolls and extortion.

Like Daher, Jazzar was able to maintain domestic security by suppressing the Bedouin tribes, but he alienated the local peasantry with stringent taxation policies that resulted in many leaving the Galilee for neighboring areas. To protect his rule, he raised a personal army of mamluks (slave soldiers) and mercenaries consisting of troops from different parts of the Islamic world, and established close ties with the Tuqan family, who were traditionally aligned with the Ottoman authorities.

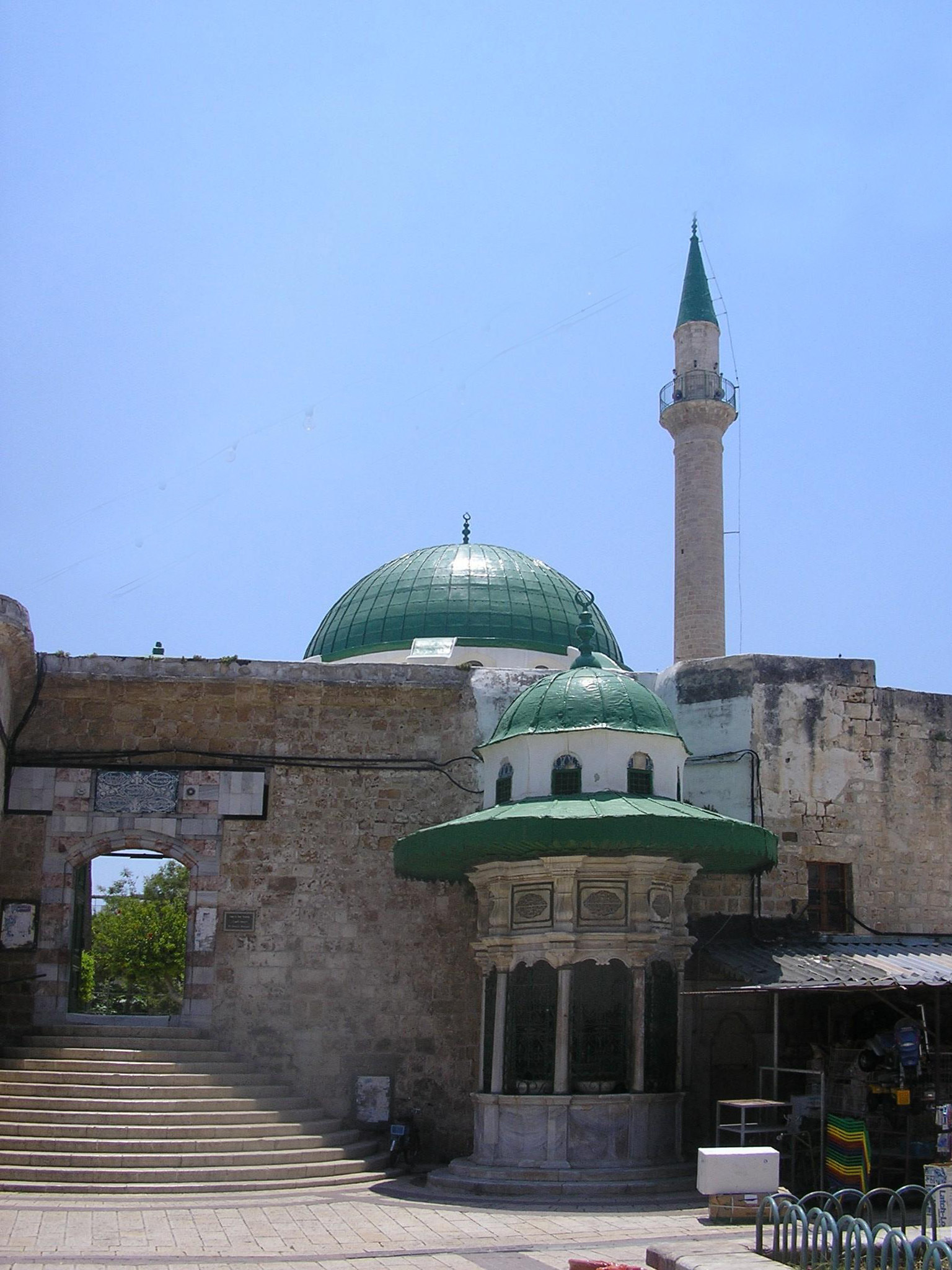
The Jazzar Mosque in Acre. Its founder, Jazzar Pasha, and his successor, Sulayman Pasha al-Adil, are buried in the mosque's courtyard

In February 1799, Napoleon Bonaparte entered Palestine after conquering Egypt as part of his campaign against the Ottomans, who were allied with his enemy, the British Empire. He first occupied Gaza and moved north along Palestine's coastal plain, capturing Jaffa, where his forces massacred some 3,000 Ottoman troops who had surrendered and many civilians. His forces then captured Haifa and used it as a staging ground for their siege of Acre. Napoleon called for Jewish support to capture Jerusalem, perhaps hoping to gain favor with Haim Farhi, Jazzar's Jewish vizier. But Napoleon could not conquer heavily fortified Acre and his defeat by Jazzar's forces, backed by the British, compelled him to withdraw from Palestine with heavy losses in May. Jazzar's victory significantly boosted his prestige.

Jazzar died in 1804 and was succeeded as Wali of Sidon by his trusted mamluk Sulayman Pasha al-Adil. Sulayman, under Farhi's guidance, made significant cuts to Acre's military and adopted a decentralization policy of non-interference with his deputy governors, such as Muhammad Abu-Nabbut of Jaffa, and diplomacy with various autonomous sheikhs, such as Musa Bey Tuqan of Nablus. Acre remained the premiere port for cash crop exports and by 1810, Sulayman was appointed to Damascus Eyalet, giving him control over most of Ottoman Syria. Before his dismissal in 1812, he managed to have the sanjaks of Latakia, Tripoli and Gaza annexed to Sidon Eyalet.

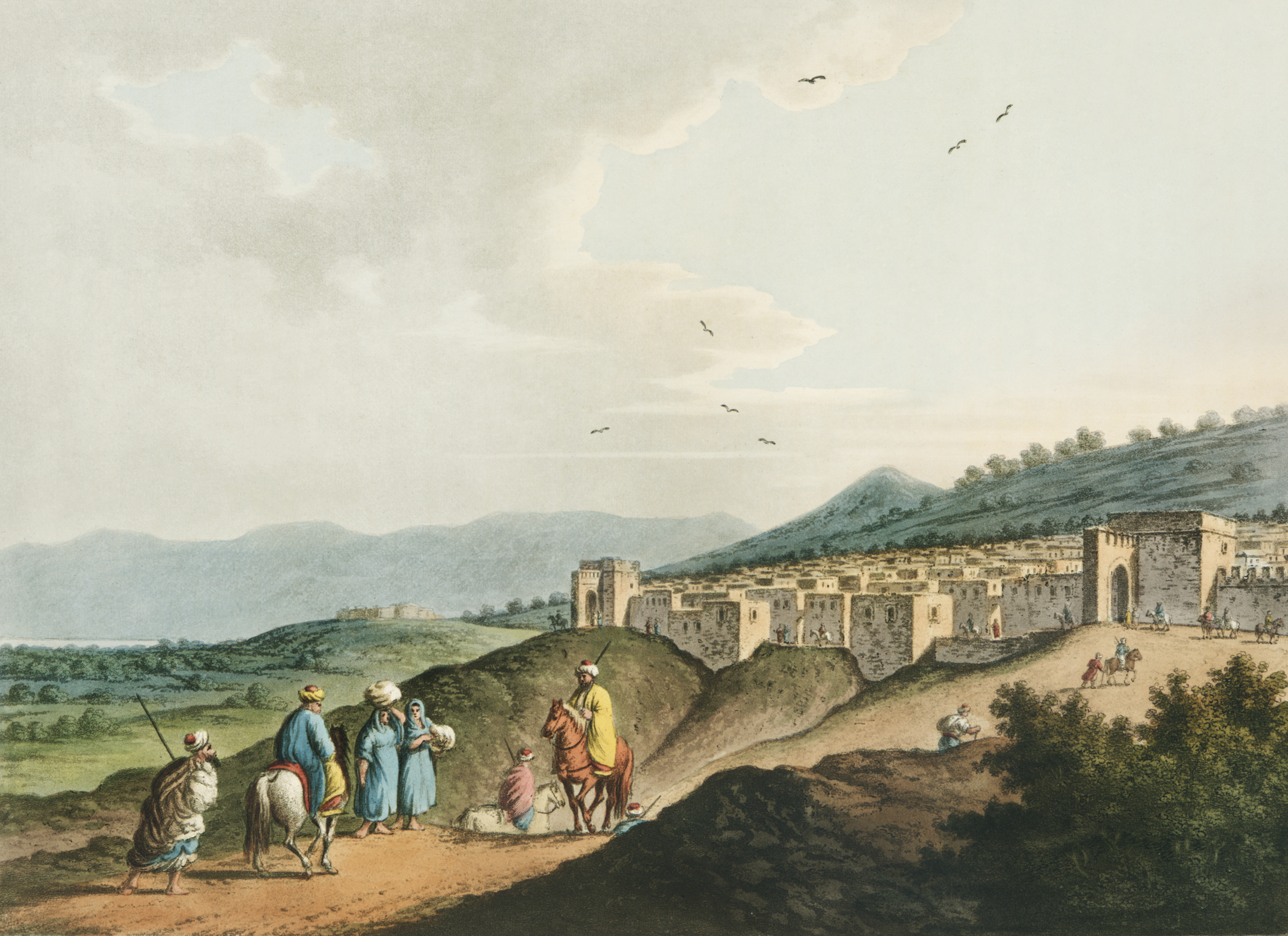
Town of Bethlehem, from Views in the Ottoman Dominions, in Europe, in Asia, and some of the Mediterranean islands (1810) illustrated by Luigi Mayer.

Abdullah Pasha, groomed for leadership by Farhi who also lobbied and bribed Ottoman officials to overcome their initial opposition, succeeded Sulayman in 1820 nine months after the latter's death in 1819. Unlike Jazzar's mamluks who sought the governorship, Farhi did not view his protégé Abdullah to be a threat to his influence. However, Abdullah had Farhi executed less than a year into his rule as the result of a power struggle.

Abdullah more or less continued his predecessor's alliance with Emir Bashir Shihab II of Mount Lebanon and together they confronted the Wali of Damascus. In 1830, the Sidon Eyalet was assigned the sanjaks of Nablus, Jerusalem and Hebron, thereby bringing all of Palestine under a single province. Abdullah's rule was marked by declining revenues from the cotton trade, efforts to reassert Acre's monopolies and poverty in Palestine. Acre under Abdullah nonetheless remained the principal force in Ottoman Syria due to instability in Damascus and the Ottomans' preoccupation with the war in Greece.

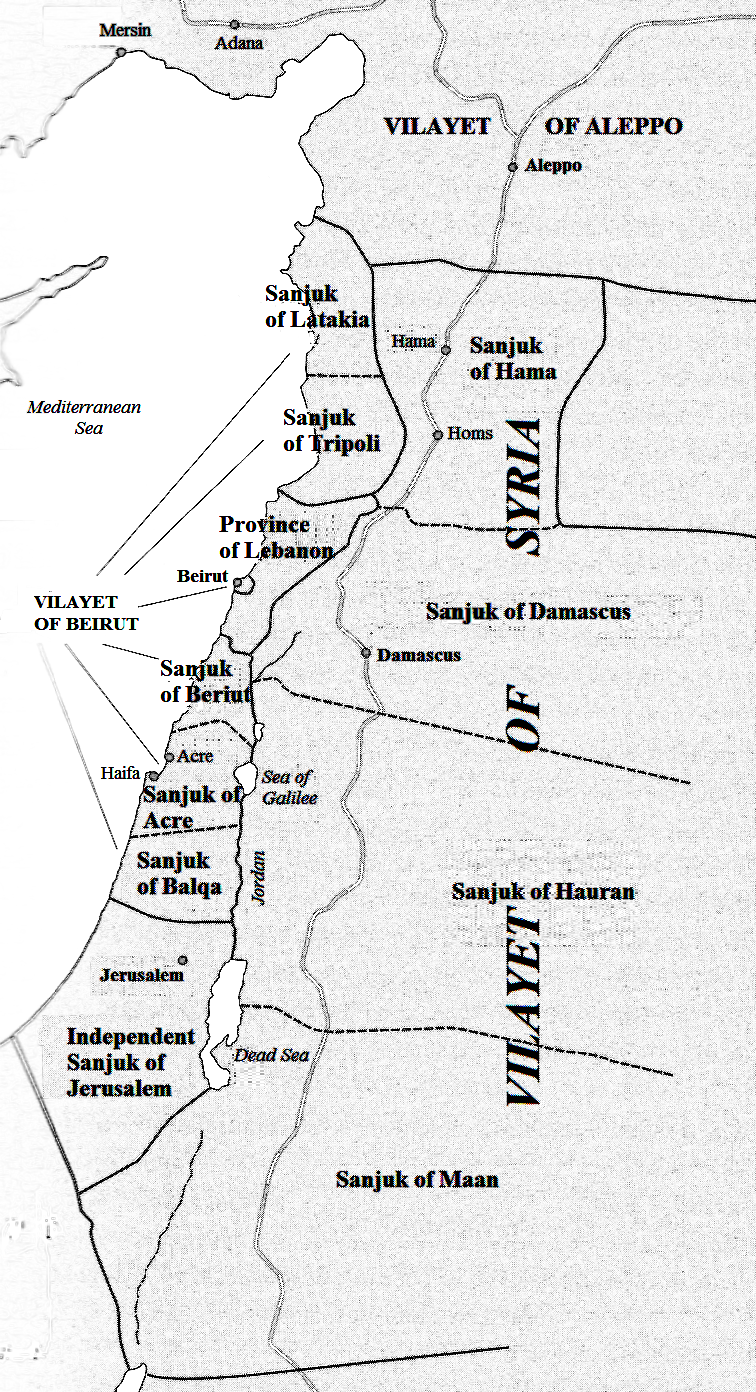
"Independent" Vilayet of Jerusalem shown within Ottoman administrative divisions in the Eastern Mediterranean coast after the reorganisation of 1887–88

=== External and internal challenges to Ottoman power ===
==== Egyptian period ====
In October 1831, Muhammad Ali of Egypt dispatched his son Ibrahim Pasha commanding a modernized army in a campaign to annex Ottoman Syria, including Palestine, having already gained control of the Sudan and western Arabian Peninsula. Initially, their entry into Palestine was not resisted by the local inhabitants, nor by the rural sheikhs of the central highlands. Abdullah Pasha resisted the conquest from Acre, but was besieged and ultimately surrendered in May 1832.

Egyptian rule brought major political and administrative reforms to Palestine and Ottoman Syria in general, representing a radical change from the semi-autonomous rule that existed in the region prior to Muhammad Ali's conquest. Among the measures taken by Ibrahim Pasha to bring all of Syria under a single administration was the introduction of city-centered advisory councils whose purpose was to standardize and administer the diverse political configurations of Syria. Composed of religious leaders, wealthy merchants and urban leaders, they solidified urban control and economic domination of the hinterland, according to historian Beshara Doumani.

Ibrahim Pasha also undertook to disarm and conscript the peasantry, a policy already instituted in Egypt to establish centralized rule and a modern army. This was opposed by the Palestinian peasantry. New taxation policies threatened the role of urban notables and rural sheikhs as mutasallims, and law enforcement measures threatened the livelihood of Bedouin tribes who garnered income providing guided "protection" to merchants and travelers. The combined hostility toward Egyptian reforms Palestine resulted in the Peasants' Revolt of 1834, posing a major threat to the flow of arms and conscripts between Egypt and Syria and to Muhammad Ali's program of modernizing Egypt. Rebel forces, whose core was based in Jabal Nablus and led by subdistrict chief Qasim al-Ahmad, captured most of Palestine, including Jerusalem, by June.

Muhammad Ali went to Palestine, opened negotiations with various rebel leaders and sympathizers, and secured a truce in July, also securing the defection of the powerful Abu Ghosh clan of Jerusalem's hinterland from the rebel forces. During the truce period, numerous religious and political leaders from Jerusalem and other cities were either arrested, exiled or executed. Qasim therefore recommenced the rebellion, viewing the truce as a ruse. Egyptian forces launched a campaign to defeat the rebels in Jabal Nablus, destroying 16 villages before capturing Nablus city on 15 July. Qasim was pursued to Hebron, which was leveled in August, and was subsequently captured and executed with most of the rebel leadership.

In the wake of Egypt's victory, Jabal Nablus was significantly weakened, the population largely disarmed, and the conscription orders were effected with 10,000 peasant conscripts sent to Egypt. Disarmament effectively introduced a monopoly of violence for central authorities in Palestine. The defeat of the powerful rural sheikhs of Jabal Nablus led to the political rise of the Abd al-Hadi family of Arraba. Their sheikh, Husayn Abd al-Hadi, supported Ibrahim Pasha during the revolt, and was promoted as the Wali of Sidon, which included all of Palestine, while his relatives and allies were appointed the mutasallims of Jerusalem, Nablus and Jaffa.

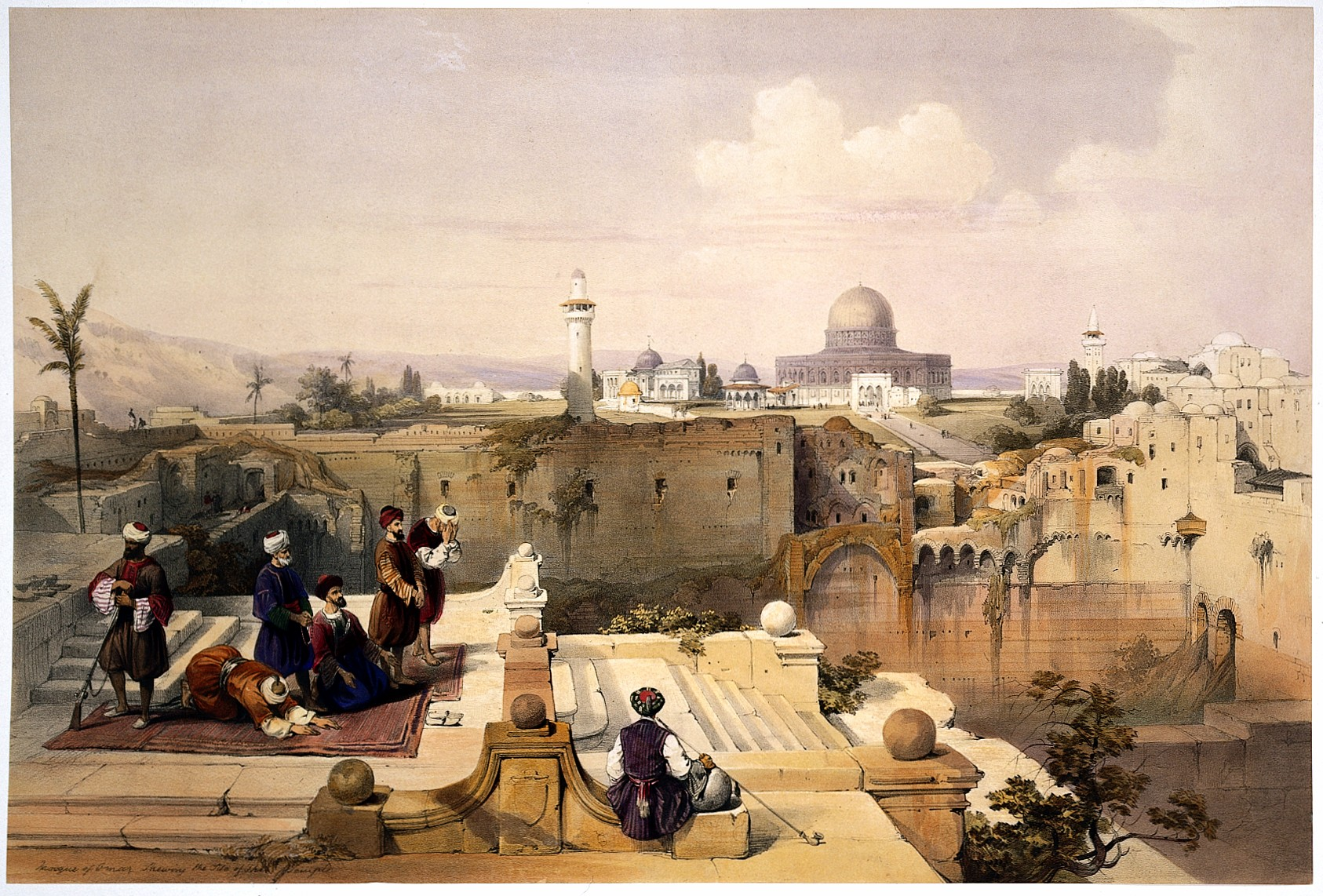
Painting of Jerusalem by David Roberts, 1839, in The Holy Land, Syria, Idumea, Arabia, Egypt, and Nubia

Britain sent their navy to shell Beirut and an Anglo-Ottoman expeditionary force landed, causing local uprisings against the Egyptian occupiers. A British naval squadron also anchored off Alexandria, and the Egyptian army retreated to Egypt with Muhammad Ali signing the Treaty of 1841. Britain thus returned control of the Levant to the Ottomans, and gained new Capitulations of the Ottoman Empire, expanding the already existing sovereignties enjoyed by Western powers that one American diplomat described as 'a state within a state'.

==== Aqil Agha period ====
Concurrently in the 1830s, Aqil Agha, a Palestinian bedouin defector from Ibrahim Pasha's army, had assembled a militant group gaining influence in Northern Palestine. His rise in Palestine angered the Ottoman appointed kaimakam of Acre, Muhammad Kubrisi, which resulted in Aqil leaving to east of Jordan river into modern day Jordan in search of allies. There, Aqil met up with Emir Fendi Al-Fayez of the Bani Sakher, the most powerful tribe in Jordan who frequently contested with the Ottomans. Emir Fendi had both the army of 4500 men and funds to support Aqil against Kubrisi. Aqil became a vassal of the Al-Fayez, as their Emirate had earlier vassalized local Arabs such as the Majali of Al-Karak and Al-Huara and the Bani Hamidah of Al-Tafilah. In 1847, Aqil's raids with the support of the Bani Sakher had Kubrisi inviting him back to the Galilee to be pardoned. His influence over the Galilee grew, resembling that of Daher al-Umar's until the Tanzimat ("reforms") of 1862. After the Tanzimat, his ability to be autonomous of the Ottomans was eroded, ending the last local obstacle to Ottoman centralization in Palestine.

==== Declining Ottoman control ====
In common usage from 1840 onward, "Palestine" was used both to describe a region and the consular jurisdictions of the Western powers therein. The Western Consuls were magistrates who tried cases involving their own citizens in foreign territories, as the Ottomans perpetuated the legal system they inherited from the Byzantine Empire, whereby the law in many matters was personal, not territorial, and the individual citizen carried his nation's law with him wherever he went. Capitulatory law applied to foreigners in Palestine, and only Consular Courts of the State of the foreigners concerned could try them, even in criminal and commercial matters. According to American Ambassador Morgenthau, Turkey had never been an independent sovereignty. The Western Powers had their own courts, marshals, colonies, schools, postal systems, religious institutions, and prisons. The Consuls also extended protections to large communities of their Jewish citizens who had settled in Palestine.

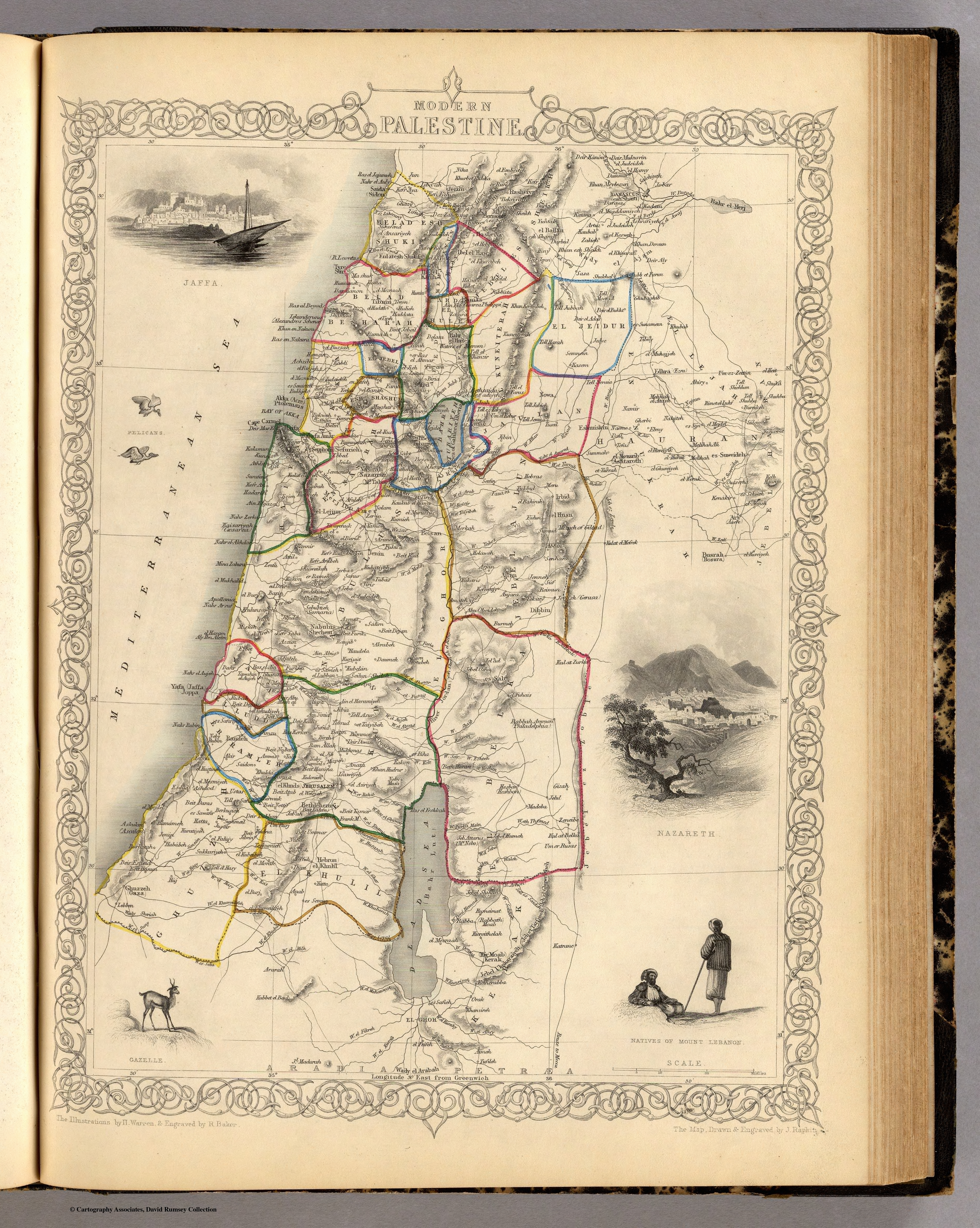
Map of "Palestine" in 1851, showing the Kaza subdivisions. At the time, the region shown was split between the Sidon Eyalet and the Damascus Eyalet

The Muslim, Christian, and Jewish communities of Palestine also exercised jurisdiction over their own members' civil affairs according to charters granted to them. For centuries the Jews and Christians had enjoyed a large degree of communal autonomy in matters of worship, jurisdiction over personal status, taxes, and in managing their schools and charitable institutions. In the 19th century those rights were formally recognized as part of the Tanzimat reforms.

In the reorganisation of 1873, which established the administrative boundaries that remained in place until 1914, Palestine was split between three major units. The northern part, above a line connecting Jaffa to north Jericho and the Jordan river, was assigned to the vilayet of Beirut, subdivided into the sanjaks (districts) of Acre, Beirut and Nablus. The southern part, from Jaffa downwards, was part of the Mutasarrifate of Jerusalem, a special district under the direct authority of Istanbul. Its southern boundaries were unclear but petered out in the eastern Sinai Peninsula and northern Negev Desert. Most of the central and southern Negev was assigned to the vilayet of Hejaz, which also included the Sinai Peninsula and the western part of Arabia.

This period saw a revival of agriculture in Palestine, which was primarily rural. In the southern coastal plain, villagers expanded cultivation into the sandy dunefields (''rimāl'') using sunken gardens known as ''mawāṣī'', which supported vines, figs, and vegetables during the Late Ottoman and British Mandate periods.

Among the educated Arab public, Filastin was a common concept, referring either to the whole of Palestine or to the Jerusalem sanjak alone or just to the area around Ramle. (Note: Haim Gerber (1998) referring to fatwas by two Hanafite Syrian jurists.) The publication of the daily paper Falastin (Palestine) from 1911 was just one example of the increasing currency of this concept.

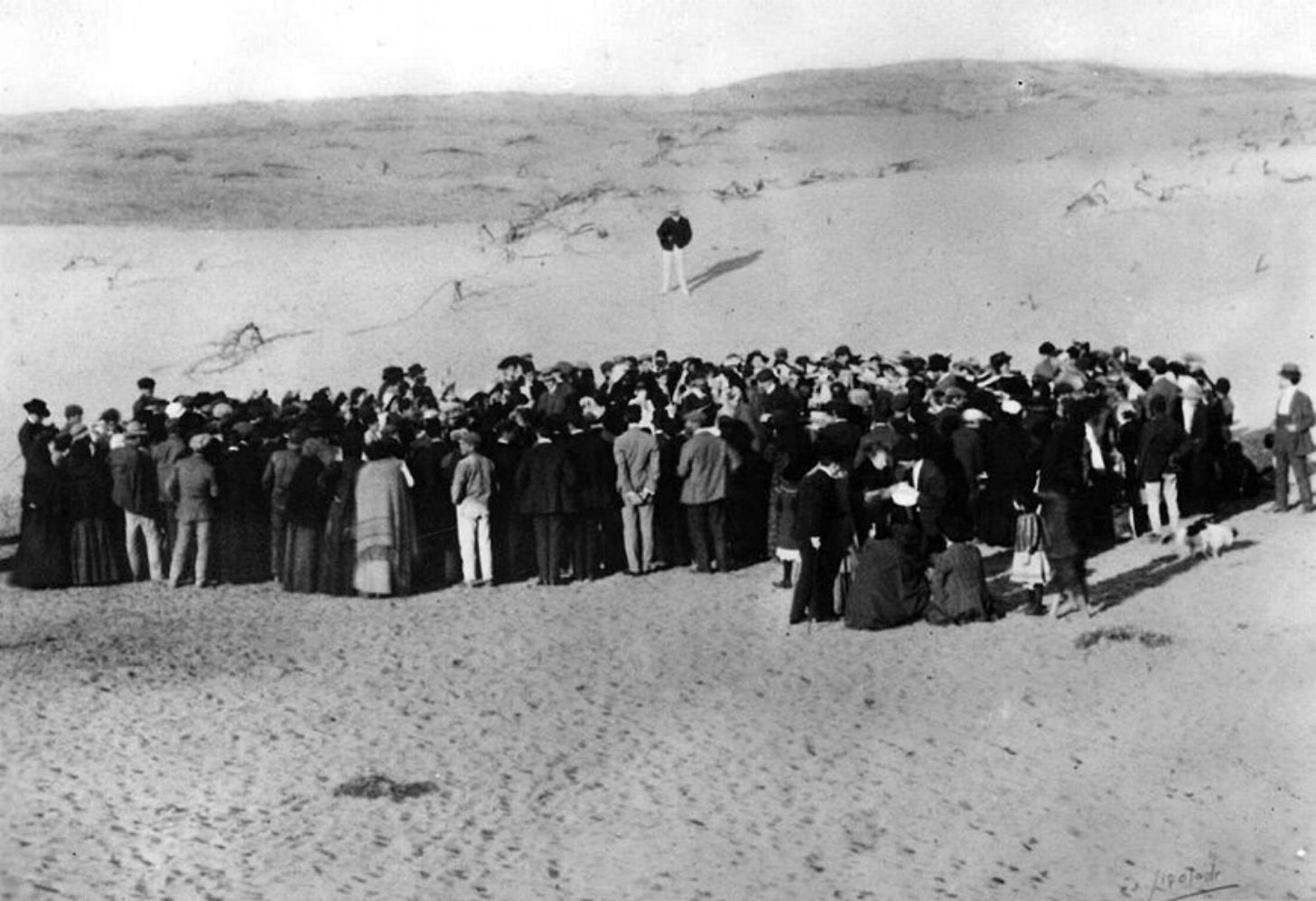
Tel Aviv was founded on land purchased from Bedouins north of Jaffa. This is the 1909 drawing of lots for the distribution of construction plots.

The rise of Zionism began in Europe in the 19th century, seeking to establish a Jewish state in Palestine, perceived by its adherents as the original homeland of the Jewish people. The end of the 19th century saw the beginning of Zionist immigration. The "First Aliyah" was the first modern widespread wave of Jewish migration to Palestine coming mostly from Eastern Europe and from Yemen, beginning in 1881–82 and lasting until 1903, bringing an estimated 25,000 Jews. In 1891, a group of Jerusalem notables sent a petition to the central Ottoman government in Istanbul calling for the cessation of Jewish immigration, and land sales to Jews. The "Second Aliyah" took place between 1904 and 1914, during which approximately 35,000 Jews immigrated, mostly from Russia and Poland.

== Great War and interregnum ==
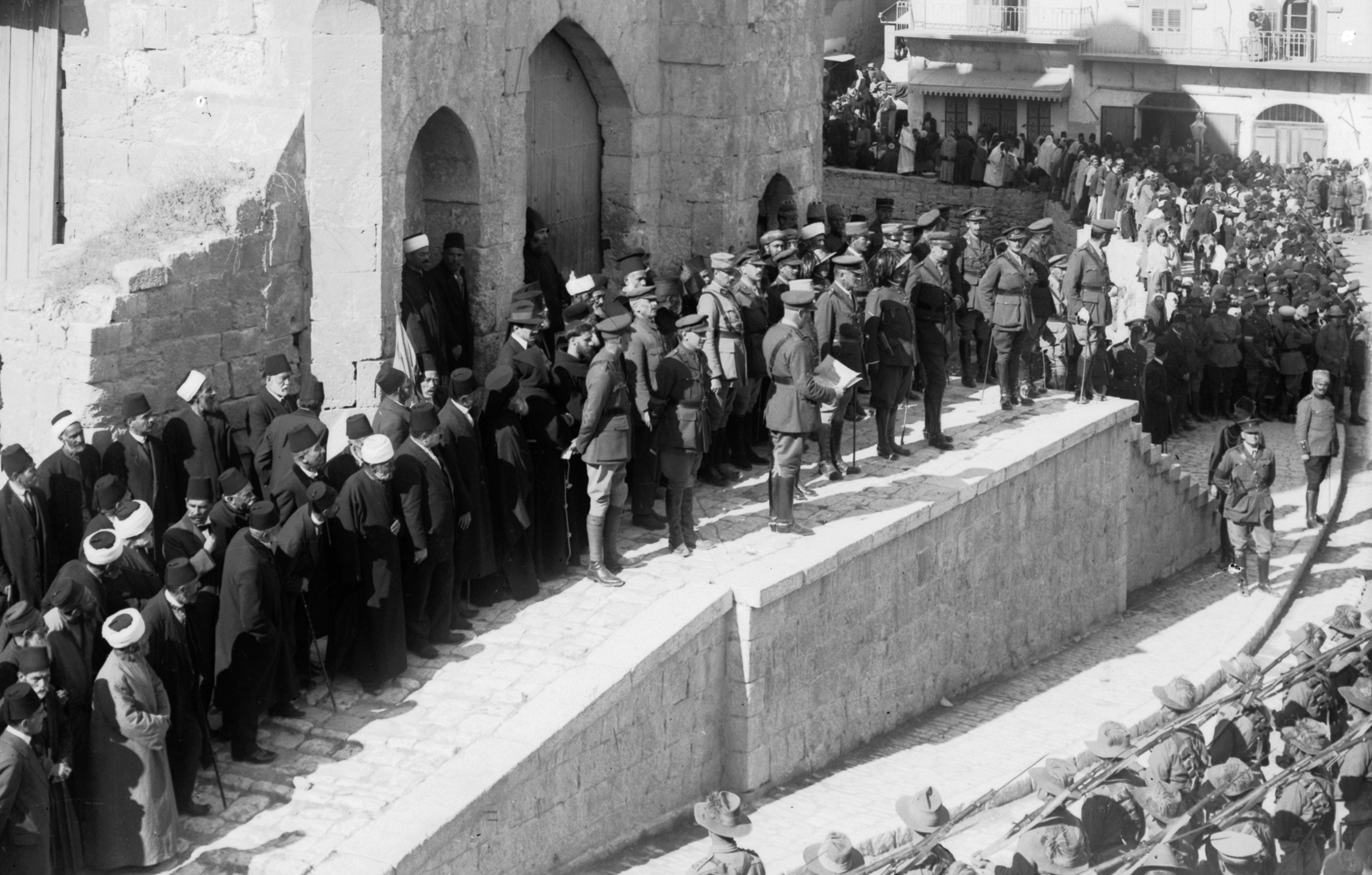
General Edmund Allenby entering Jerusalem, 11 December 1917

During World War I the Ottomans sided with the German Empire and the Central Powers. As a result, they were driven from much of the region by the British Empire during the dissolution phase of the Ottoman Empire.

Under the secret Sykes–Picot Agreement of 1916, it was envisioned that most of Palestine, when conquered from the Ottoman Empire, would become an international zone not under direct French or British colonial control. Shortly thereafter, British foreign minister Arthur Balfour issued the Balfour Declaration, which promised to establish a "Jewish national home" in Palestine, but appeared to contradict the 1915–16 Hussein-McMahon Correspondence, which contained an undertaking to form a united Arab state in exchange for the Great Arab Revolt against the Ottoman Empire in World War I. McMahon's promises could have been seen by Arab nationalists as a pledge of immediate Arab independence, an undertaking violated by the region's subsequent partition into British and French League of Nations mandates under the secret Sykes-Picot Agreement of May 1916, which became the real cornerstone of the geopolitics structuring the entire region. The Balfour Declaration, likewise, was seen by Jewish nationalists as the cornerstone of a future Jewish homeland.

The British Egyptian Expeditionary Force, commanded by Edmund Allenby, captured Jerusalem on 9 December 1917 and occupied the whole of the Levant following the defeat of Turkish forces in Palestine at the Battle of Megiddo in September 1918 and the capitulation of Turkey on 31 October. (Note: See also Third Battle of Gaza and Battle of Beersheba)

== British Mandate period ==
Zones of French and British influence and control proposed in the Sykes-Picot Agreement

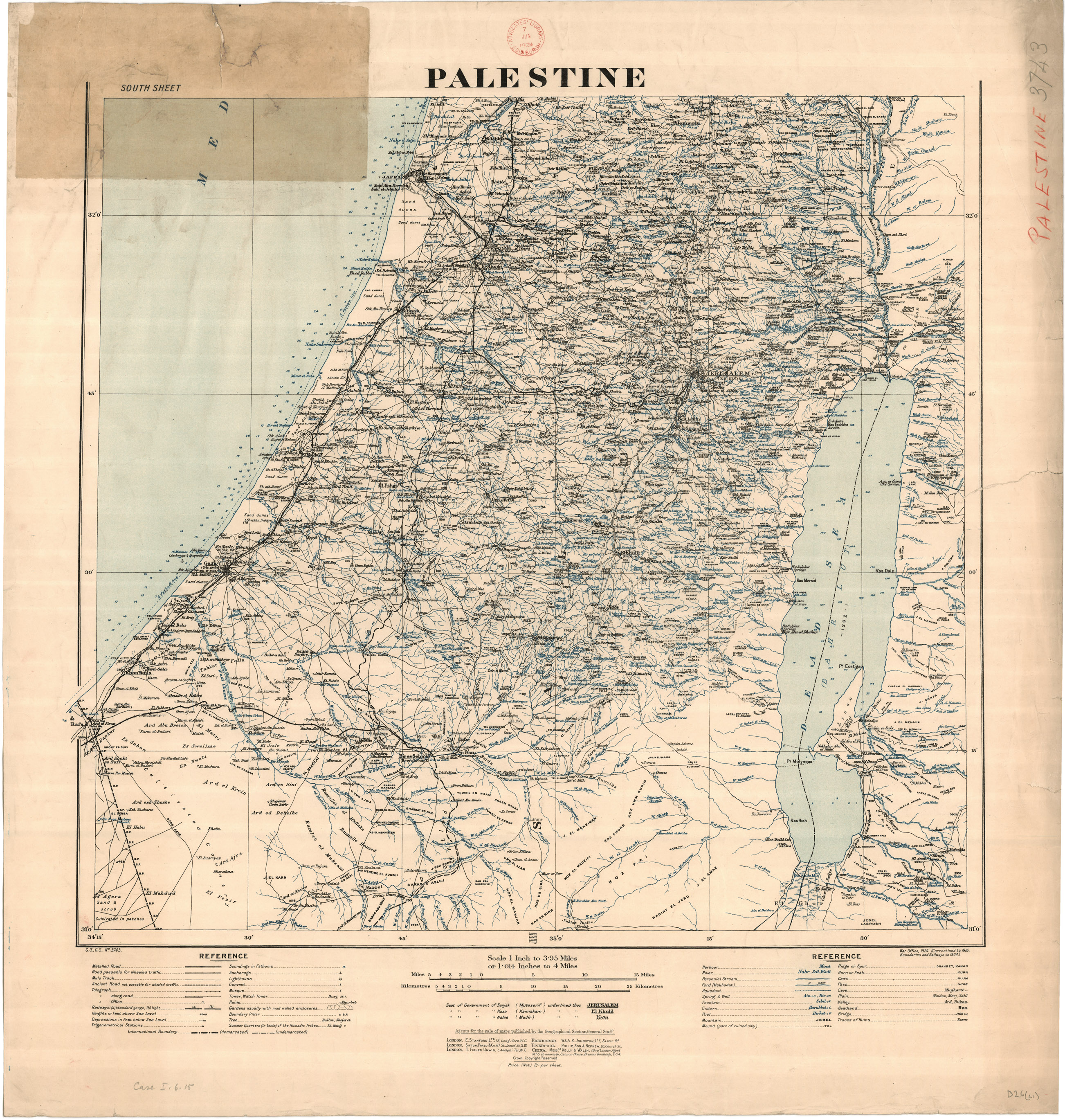
Southern Palestine in 1924

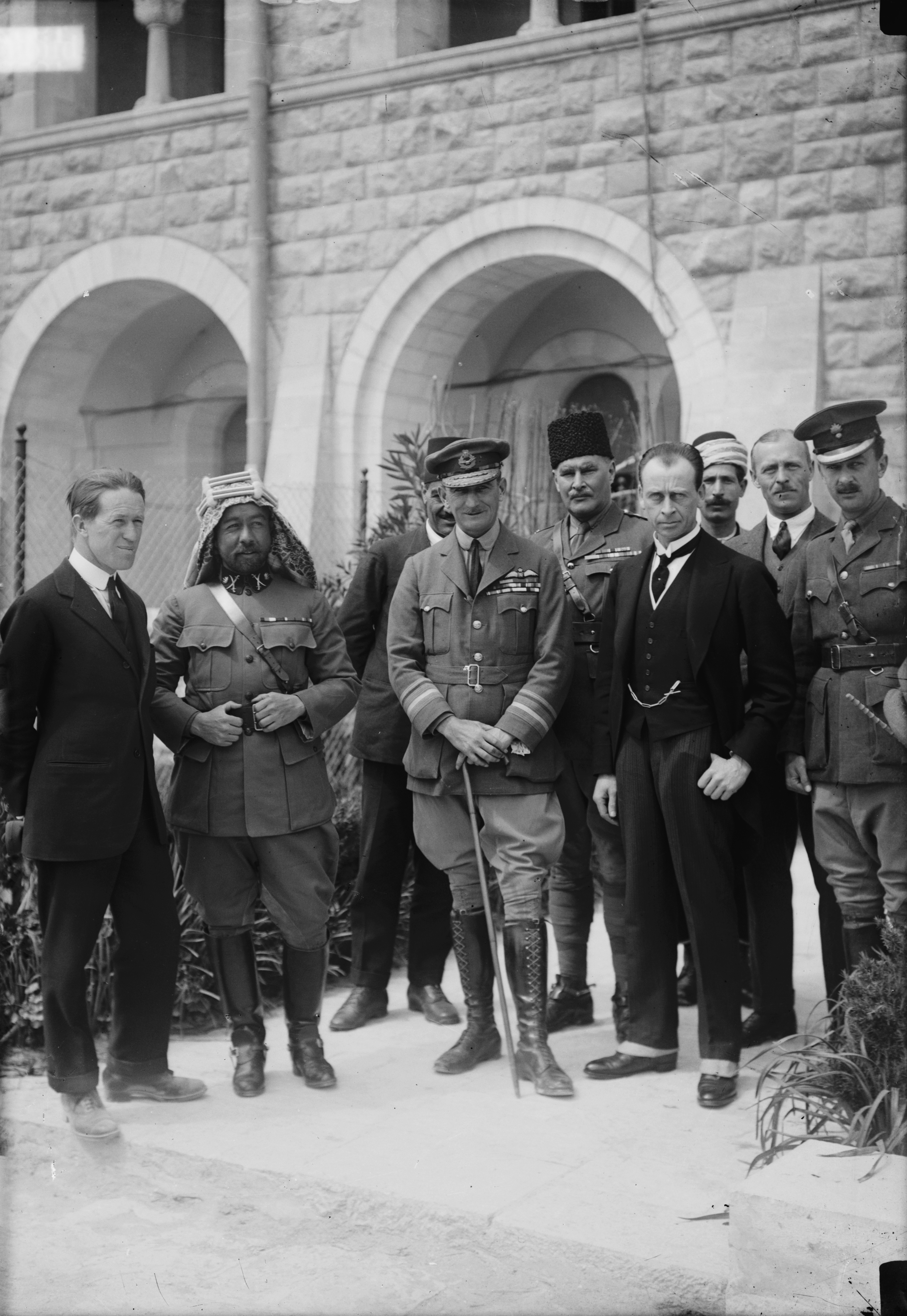
The new era in Palestine. The arrival of Sir Herbert Samuel, H.B.M. High Commissioner with Col. Lawrence, Emir Abdullah, Air Marshal Salmond and Sir Wyndham Deedes, 1920.

Following the First World War and the occupation of the region by the British, the principal Allied and associated powers drafted the mandate, which was formally approved by the League of Nations in 1922. Great Britain administered Palestine on behalf of the League of Nations between 1920 and 1948, a period referred to as the "British Mandate". The preamble of the mandate declared:

Whereas the Principal Allied Powers have also agreed that the Mandatory should be responsible for putting into effect the declaration originally made on November 2nd, 1917, by the Government of His Britannic Majesty, and adopted by the said Powers, in favor of the establishment in Palestine of a national home for the Jewish people, it being clearly understood that nothing should be done which might prejudice the civil and religious rights of existing non-Jewish communities in Palestine, or the rights and political status enjoyed by Jews in any other country.

Not all were satisfied with the mandate. The League of Nations' objective with the mandate system was to administer the parts of the former Ottoman Empire, which the Middle East had controlled since the 16th century, "until such time as they are able to stand alone". Some of the Arabs felt that Britain was violating the McMahon-Hussein Correspondence and the understanding of the Arab Revolt. Some wanted unification with Syria: in February 1919, several Muslim and Christian groups from Jaffa and Jerusalem met and adopted a platform endorsing unity with Syria and opposition to Zionism (this is sometimes called the First Palestinian National Congress). A letter was sent to Damascus authorizing Faisal to represent the Arabs of Palestine at the Paris Peace Conference. In May 1919 a Syrian National Congress was held in Damascus, and a Palestinian delegation attended its sessions.

In April 1920, violent Arab disturbances against the Jews in Jerusalem occurred, which came to be known as the 1920 Palestine riots. The riots followed rising tensions in Arab-Jewish relations over the implications of Zionist immigration. The British military administration's erratic response failed to contain the rioting, which continued for four days. As a result of the events, trust among the British, Jews, and Arabs eroded. One consequence was that the Jewish community increased moves towards an autonomous infrastructure and security apparatus parallel to that of the British administration.

In April 1920, the Allied Supreme Council (the United States, Great Britain, France, Italy and Japan) met at Sanremo and formal decisions were taken on the allocation of mandate territories. The United Kingdom obtained a mandate for Palestine and France obtained a mandate for Syria. The boundaries of the mandates and the conditions under which they were to be held were not decided. The Zionist Organization's representative at Sanremo, Chaim Weizmann, subsequently reported to his colleagues in London:

There are still important details outstanding, such as the actual terms of the mandate and the question of the boundaries in Palestine. There is the delimitation of the boundary between French Syria and Palestine, which will constitute the northern frontier and the eastern line of demarcation, adjoining Arab Syria. The latter is not likely to be fixed until the Emir Feisal attends the Peace Conference, probably in Paris.

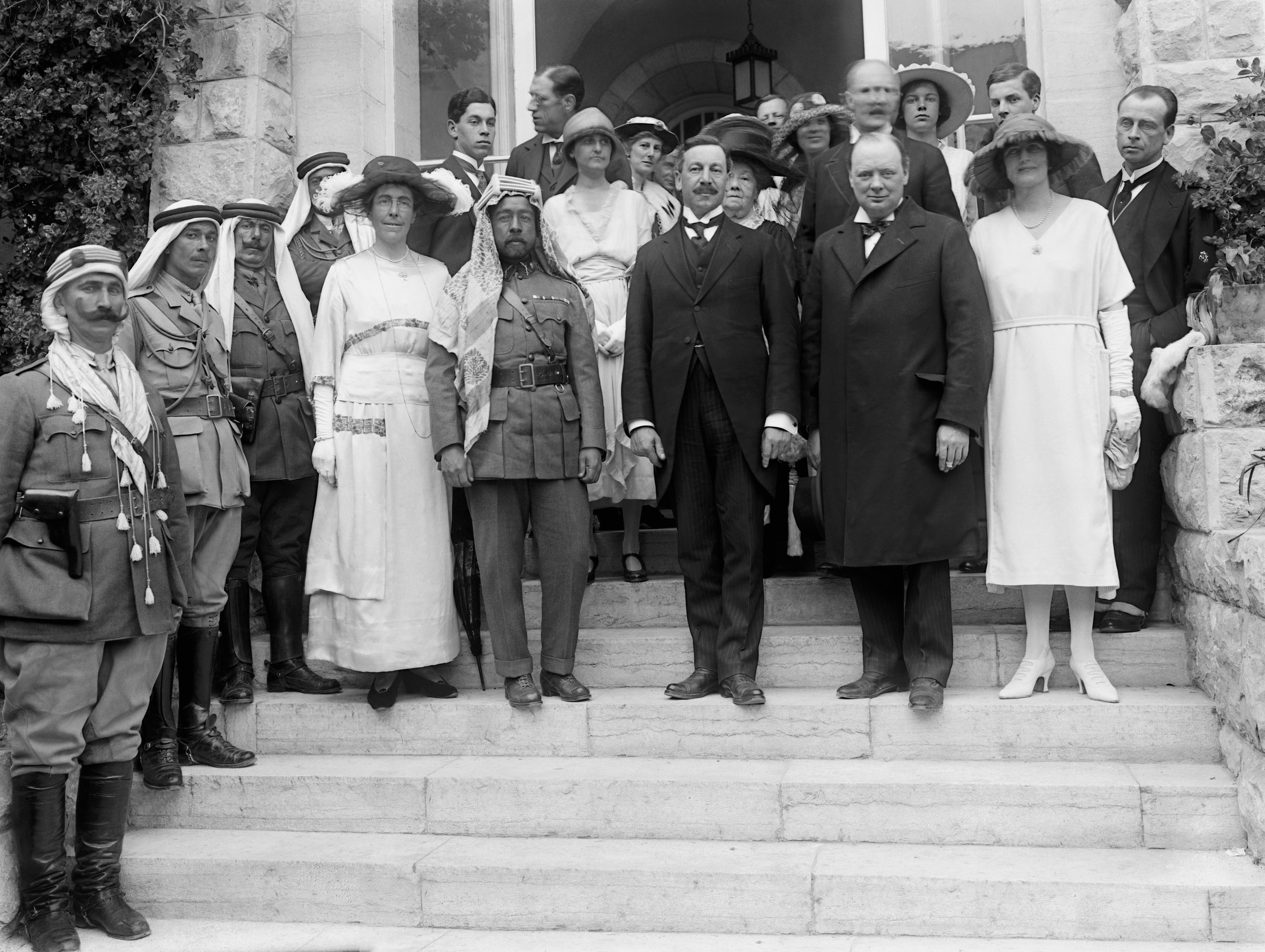
Churchill and Abdullah (with Herbert Samuel) during their negotiations in Jerusalem, March 1921

In July 1920, the French drove Faisal bin Husayn from Damascus, ending his already negligible control over the region of Transjordan, where local chiefs traditionally resisted any central authority. The sheikhs, who had earlier pledged their loyalty to the Sharif of Mecca, asked the British to undertake the region's administration. Herbert Samuel asked for the extension of the Palestine government's authority to Transjordan, but at meetings in Cairo and Jerusalem between Winston Churchill and Emir Abdullah in March 1921 it was agreed that Abdullah would administer the territory (initially for six months only) on behalf of the Palestine administration. In the summer of 1921 Transjordan was included within the Mandate, but excluded from the provisions for a Jewish National Home. On 24 July 1922, the League of Nations approved the terms of the British Mandate over Palestine and Transjordan. On 16 September the League formally approved a memorandum from Lord Balfour confirming the exemption of Transjordan from the clauses of the mandate concerning the creation of a Jewish national home and Jewish settlement.

With Transjordan coming under the administration of the British Mandate, the mandate's collective territory became constituted of 23% Palestine and 77% Transjordan. The mandate for Palestine, while specifying actions in support of Jewish immigration and political status, stated, in Article 25, that in the territory to the east of the Jordan River, Britain could 'postpone or withhold' those articles of the Mandate concerning a Jewish National Home. Transjordan was a very sparsely populated region (especially in comparison with Palestine proper) due to its relatively limited resources and largely desert environment.

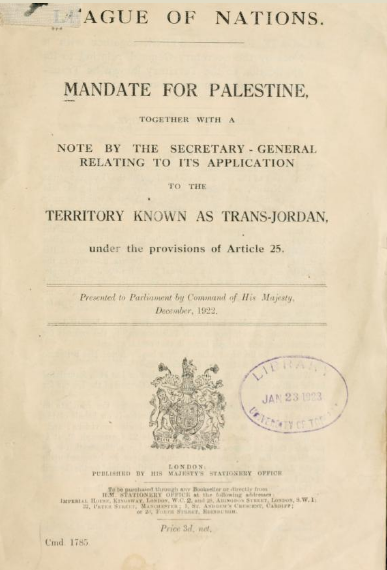
Palestine and Transjordan were incorporated (under different legal and administrative arrangements) into the "Mandate for Palestine and Transjordan Memorandum" issued by the League of Nations to Great Britain on 29 September 1923

In 1923, an agreement between the United Kingdom and France confirmed the border between the British Mandate of Palestine and the French Mandate of Syria. The British handed over the southern Golan Heights to the French in return for the northern Jordan Valley. The border was re-drawn so that both sides of the Jordan River and the whole of the Sea of Galilee, including a 10-metre-wide strip along the northeastern shore, were made a part of Palestine, with the provisions that Syria have fishing and navigation rights in the lake.

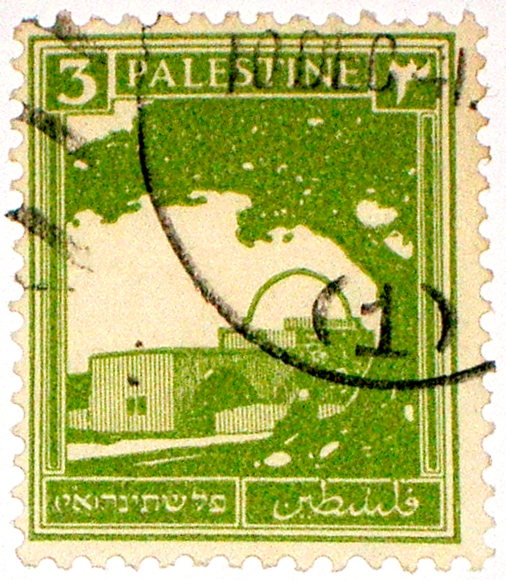
Rachel's Tomb on a 1927 British Mandate stamp. "Palestine" is shown in English, Arabic (فلسطين), and Hebrew, the latter includes the acronym א״י for Eretz Yisrael

The first reference to the Palestinians, without qualifying them as Arabs, is to be found in a document of the Permanent Executive Committee, composed of Muslims and Christians, presenting a series of formal complaints to the British authorities on 26 July 1928.

=== Governance ===
The most important Palestinian leader in Mandatory Palestine was Haj Amin al-Husayni. He was appointed "Grand Mufti of Palestine" by the British and used his position to lead the Palestinians' unsuccessful struggle for independence. He fled Palestine in 1937 to avoid being arrested for leading the Great Revolt but would still lead the Palestinians in his exile.

In 1921, the British created the institution the Muslim Higher Council to provide religious leadership. They proceeded to recognize it as representing the Arabs of Palestine, in spite of the existing nationalist Executive Arab Committee that already sought that role. The council's duties included administration of religious endowments and appointment of religious judges and local muftis. Haj Amin was chosen to head the institution and members of his family were given precedence on the council. The rival family, the Nashashibis, were directed towards municipal positions. This was in line with the British strategy to nurture rivalries among the Palestinian elite. They succeeded and the schism created would hamper the growth of modern forms of national organization for decades to come.

Al-Istiqlal, the Arab Independence Party, was established officially in 1932 but existed unofficially as early as 1930. The Arab Higher Committee (al-Lajna al-'Arabiyya al-'Ulya), consisting of members of the Husaynis and Nashashibis, was established shortly after the outbreak of the Great Revolt in 1936.

=== Demographics and Jewish immigration ===
The British facilitated Zionist settlement of Palestine by at least initially upholding their commitment under the Mandate to facilitate Jewish mass immigration. The latter was a factor in alarming the Arabs. In the census conducted in 1922 the population of Palestine was 763,550 of which 89 percent were Arabs and 11 percent Jews.

In 1933, Adolf Hitler came to power in Germany, and the Haavara agreement between the Zionist Federation and the Third Reich was to facilitate the emigration of German Jews. Jewish immigration dramatically increased during the mid-1930s. In 1935, 62,000 Jews entered Palestine, the highest number since the mandate began in 1920.

Between 1922 and 1947, the annual growth rate of the Jewish sector of the economy was 13.2%, mainly due to immigration and foreign capital, while that of the Arab was 6.5%. Per capita, these figures were 4.8% and 3.6% respectively. By 1936, the Jewish sector had eclipsed the Arab one, and Jewish individuals earned 2.6 times as much as Arabs. In terms of human capital, there was a huge difference. For instance, the literacy rates in 1932 were 86% for the Jews against 22% for the Arabs, although Arab literacy was steadily increasing. Palestine continued to develop economically during World War II, with increased industrial and agricultural outputs and the period was considered an "economic Boom". In terms of Arab-Jewish relations, these were relatively quiet times.

Starting in 1939 and throughout World War II, Britain reduced the number of Jewish immigrants allowed into Palestine, following the publication of the White Paper of 1939. Once the 15,000 annual quota was exceeded, Jews fleeing Nazi persecution were placed in detention camps or deported to places such as Mauritius. The Anglo-American Committee of Inquiry's findings published in 1946 divested the White Paper and caused Britain to ease restrictions on Jewish immigration to Palestine.

=== 1936–1939 Revolt ===
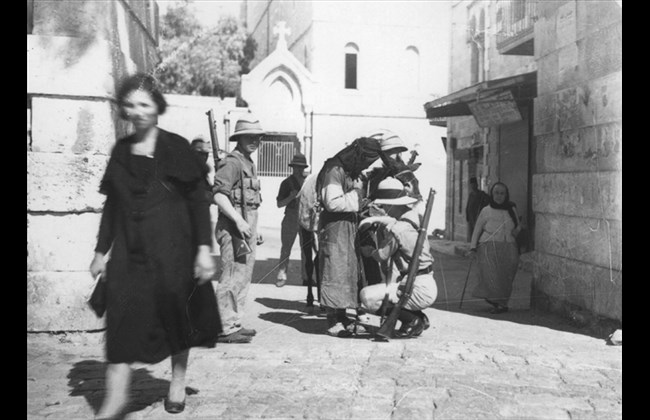
British soldiers frisk a Palestinian man in Jerusalem in the late 1930s, photo by Khalil Raad.

The revolt of 1936–1939, also known as the Great Palestinian Revolt, is one of the formative events of Palestinian nationalism. Driven by resentment with British rule and with the Zionist settlement of Palestine, the revolt began as a general strike but evolved into an armed insurrection. The British response to the revolt was harsh and it expanded its military force in Palestine, deploying over 100,000 troops. Imprisonment without charges or trial, curfews, whip lashings, house demolitions, and collective punishment against villages and families were some of the practices it employed to quell the revolt. An estimated 10 percent of the adult Palestinian male population were killed, wounded, deported, or imprisoned

The revolt was a disaster for the Palestinians and it failed to achieve its two goals; the uprooting of the Zionist settlement and the termination of the British Mandate. Due to the British crackdown, the Palestinians were left without a local leadership, as most of their leaders either fled the country or were deported by the authorities. Infighting between rival families deepened rifts in Palestinian society causing irreparable damage, all while the Zionists mobilized and British-Zionist cooperation increased.

==== General strike ====
In November 1935 the guerilla leader Sheikh Izz ad-Din al-Qassam was killed in a shootout with British police in the hills near Jenin. Thousands attended his funeral which turned into demonstrations. His death became a rallying call for others.

Al-Istiqlal called a general strike in April 1936 and the Palestinian leadership gave its blessing. The strike ended after a few months when Arab leaders instructed the Palestinians to desist in exchange for negotiations with the British on the future of Palestine. Meanwhile, volunteers led by Fawzi al-Qawuqji entered the country and engaged in unsuccessful guerilla warfare. The British destroyed much of al-Qawiqji's forces and by mid-October it left the country.

==== Peel Commission ====
In 1937, the Peel Commission recommended dividing Palestine into a Jewish and an Arab state. The Jews would receive Tel Aviv, the coastal plain, the northern valleys, and parts of the Galilee, while the Arabs would receive the West Bank of the river Jordan, central Palestine and the southern desert. Britain would retain Jerusalem and a narrow corridor linking it to the sea. Importantly, the commission envisaged a population exchange similar to the exchanges between Turkey and Greece in the 1920s; thousands of Arabs who had their homes within the territory of the Jewish state would be forcibly removed.

The Zionist leadership supported partition in principle, but expressed reservations about the commission's findings and some opponents thought that the territory allotted to the Jewish state was too small. Ben-Gurion saw it as the first step in a plan to gradually claim the entire country on both sides of Jordan. He was especially pleased with the commission's recommendation of forced population transfer; a "really Jewish" state is about to become reality, he wrote in his diary.

The Palestinians led by the mufti opposed dividing Palestine, but a minority, led by the Nashashibis, supported it. This led to animosity between Husayni's and Nashashibi's supporters as the former accused the latter of treason.

==== Escalation and disintegration ====
The revolt escalated in the latter half of 1937 and numerous rebel bands emerged. The rebels not only attacked British and Jewish targets, but also Palestinians who were accused of collaborating with the enemy. At the same time, the British enacted oppressive emergency regulations causing strife for the civilians. Popular support for the rebels declined.

The revolt waned in the fall 1938 as the British organized the rebels' opponents in armed groups called "peace bands," headed by Fakhri al-Nashashibi and Fakhri 'Abd al-Hadi, previously Qawiqji's deputy. Aided by these, the British effectively exposed the rebels' hiding places and by late 1939 all rebel activity had ceased.

==== Zionist mobilization ====
The Haganah (Hebrew for "defense"), a Jewish paramilitary organization, actively supported British efforts to quell the revolt. Although the British administration did not officially recognize the Haganah, the British security forces cooperated with it by forming the Jewish Settlement Police and Special Night Squads. A splinter group of the Haganah, called the Irgun (or Etzel) adopted a policy of violent retaliation against Arabs for attacks on Jews; the Hagana has adopted a policy of restraint. In a meeting in Alexandria in July 1937 between Irgun founder Ze'ev Jabotinsky, commander Col. Robert Bitker and chief-of-staff Moshe Rosenberg, the need for indiscriminate retaliation due to the difficulty of limiting operations to only the "guilty" was explained. The Irgun launched attacks against public gathering places such as markets and cafes. (Note: See for example the incident on 14 March 1937 when Arieh Yitzhaki and Benjamin Zeroni tossed a bomb into the Azur coffee house outside Tel Aviv, as reported in Bell 1996, pp. 35–36.)

=== World War II ===
A Jewish Brigade headquarters under both the Union Flag and the Jewish flag

When the Second World War broke out, the Jewish population sided with Britain. David Ben-Gurion, head of the Jewish Agency for Israel, defined the policy with what became a famous motto: "We will fight the war as if there were no White Paper, and we will fight the White Paper as if there were no war." While this represented the Jewish population as a whole, there were exceptions (see below).

As in most of the Arab world, there was no unanimity among the Palestinian Arabs as to their position regarding the combatants in World War II. A number of leaders and public figures saw an Axis victory as the likely outcome and a way of securing Palestine back from the Zionists and the British. Mohammad Amin al-Husayni, Grand Mufti of Jerusalem, spent the rest of the war in Nazi Germany and the occupied areas. About 6,000 Palestinian Arabs and 30,000 Palestinian Jews joined the British forces.

On 10 June 1940, Italy declared war on the British Commonwealth and sided with Germany. Within a month, the Italians attacked Palestine from the air, bombing Tel Aviv and Haifa.

In 1942, there was a period of anxiety for the Yishuv, when the forces of German General Erwin Rommel advanced east in North Africa towards the Suez Canal and there was fear that they would conquer Palestine. This event was the direct cause for the founding, with British support, of the Palmach – a highly trained regular unit belonging to Haganah (which was mostly made up of reserve troops).

On 3 July 1944, the British government consented to the establishment of a Jewish Brigade with hand-picked Jewish and also non-Jewish senior officers. The brigade fought in Europe, most notably against the Germans in Italy from March 1945 until the end of the war in May 1945. Members of the Brigade played a key role in the Berihah's efforts to help Jews escape Europe for Palestine. Later, veterans of the Jewish Brigade became key participants of the new State of Israel's Israel Defense Forces.

In 1944, Menachem Begin assumed the Irgun's leadership, determined to force the British government to remove its troops entirely from Palestine. Citing that the British had reneged on their original promise of the Balfour Declaration, and that the White Paper of 1939 restricting Jewish immigration was an escalation of their pro-Arab policy, he decided to break with the Haganah. Soon after he assumed command, a formal 'Declaration of Revolt' was publicized, and armed attacks against British forces were initiated. Lehi, another splinter group, opposed cessation of operations against the British authorities all along. The Jewish Agency for Israel, which opposed those actions and the challenge to its role as government in preparation responded with "The Hunting Season" – severe actions against supporters of the Irgun and Lehi, including turning them over to the British.

=== End of the British Mandate 1945–1948 ===
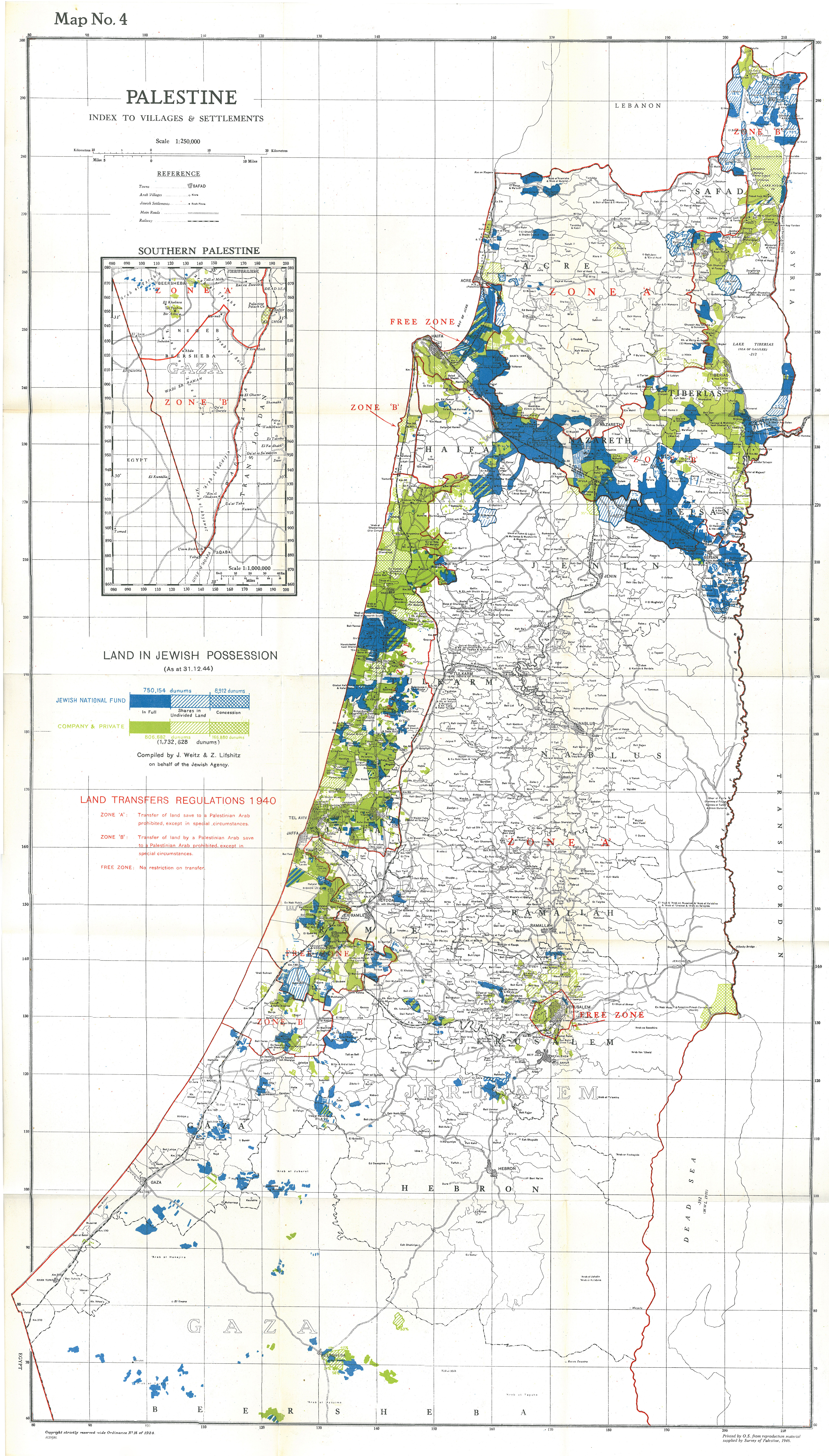
A map showing Jewish-owned land as of 31 December 1944, including land owned in full, shared in undivided land and State Lands under concession. This constituted 6% of the total land area, of which more than half was held by the JNF and PICA

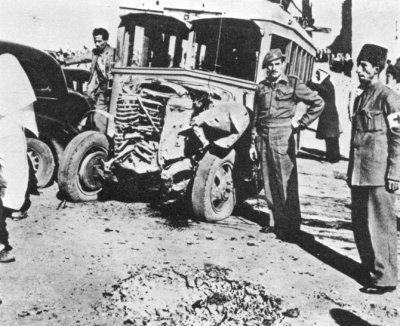
An Arab autobus after an attack by Irgun, 29 December 1947

In the years following World War II, Britain's control over Palestine became increasingly tenuous. This was caused by a combination of factors, including:

- The costs of maintaining an army of over 100,000 men in Palestine weighed heavily on a British economy suffering from post-war depression, and was another cause for British public opinion to demand an end to the Mandate.
- Rapid deterioration due to the actions of the Jewish paramilitary organizations (Hagana, Irgun and Lehi), involving attacks on strategic installations (by all three) as well as on British forces and officials (by the Irgun and Lehi). This caused severe damage to British morale and prestige, as well as increasing opposition to the mandate in Britain itself, public opinion demanding to "bring the boys home".
- The U.S. Congress was delaying a loan necessary to prevent British bankruptcy. The delays were in response to the British refusal to fulfill a promise given to Truman that 100,000 Holocaust survivors would be allowed to emigrate to Palestine.

In early 1947 the British Government announced their desire to terminate the Mandate, and asked the United Nations General Assembly to make recommendations regarding the future of the country. The British Administration declined to accept the responsibility for implementing any solution that wasn't acceptable to both the Jewish and the Arab communities, or to allow other authorities to take over responsibility for public security prior to the termination of its mandate on 15 May 1948.

== UN partition and the 1948 Palestine War ==
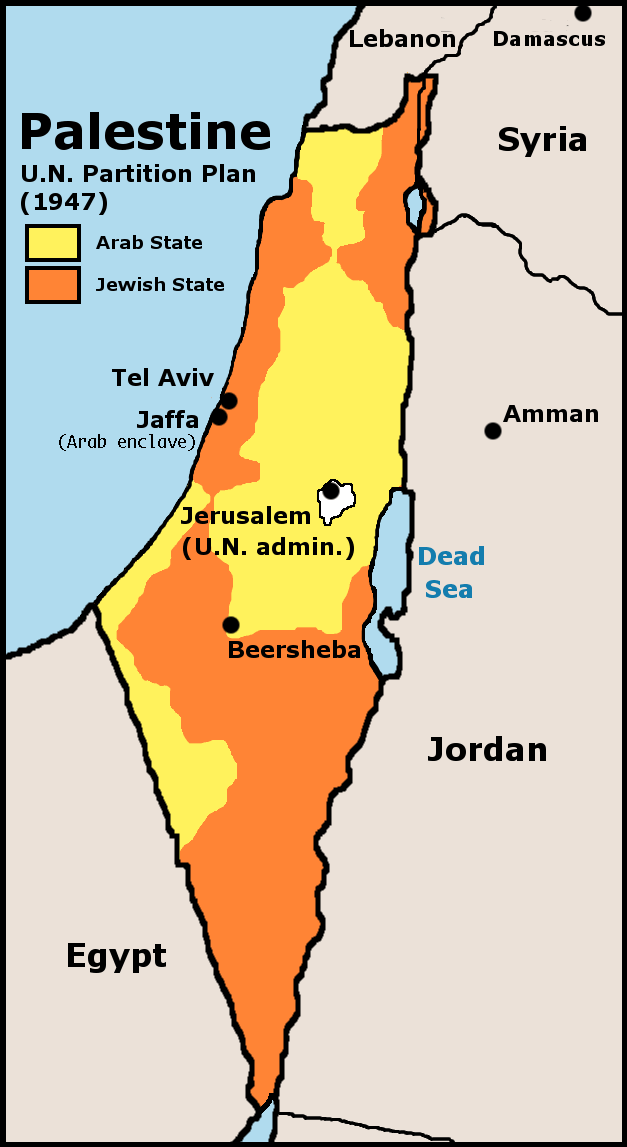
The UN partition plan, 1947

On 29 November 1947, the United Nations General Assembly, voting 33 to 13 in favour with 10 abstentions, adopted Resolution 181 (II) (though not legally binding) recommending a partition with the Economic Union of Mandatory Palestine to follow the termination of the British Mandate. The plan was to partition Palestine into an "Independent Arab state alongside a Jewish States, and the Special International Regime for the City of Jerusalem". Jerusalem was to encompass Bethlehem. Zionist leaders (including the Jewish Agency for Israel), accepted the plan, while Palestinian Arab leaders rejected it and all independent Muslim and Arab states voted against it. (Note: 6 Arab states, Egypt, Iraq, Lebanon, Saudi Arabia, Syria, Yemen: 4 Moslem states, Afghanistan, Iran, Pakistan, Turkey: Greece, Cuba and India also voted against (Cattan 1988, p. 36).) Almost immediately, sectarian violence erupted and spread, killing hundreds of Arabs, Jews and British over the ensuing months.

The UN resolution was the catalyst for a full scale civil war. For four months, under continuous Arab provocation and attack, the Yishuv was usually on the defensive while occasionally retaliating. Arab volunteers of the Arab Liberation Army entered Palestine to fight alongside the Palestinians, but the April–May offensive of Yishuv forces defeated the Arab forces and Arab Palestinian society collapsed. By the time the armistice was signed, some 700,000 Palestinians caught up in the turmoil fled or were driven from their homes. This event is now known as the Nakba.

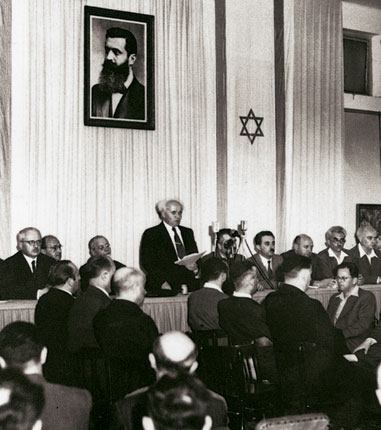
David Ben-Gurion proclaiming independence in May 1948, beneath a large portrait of Theodor Herzl, founder of modern Zionism

On 14 May 1948, David Ben-Gurion and the declared the establishment of a Jewish state in Eretz Israel (The Land of Israel), to be known as the State of Israel. The neighbouring Arab states intervened to prevent the partition and support the Palestinian Arab population. While Transjordan and Egypt took control of territory designated for the future Arab State, Syrian and Iraqi expeditionary forces attacked Israel without success. The most intensive battles were waged between the Jordanian and Israeli forces over the control of Jerusalem.

On 11 June, a truce was accepted by all parties. Israel used the lull to undertake a large-scale reinforcement of its army. In a series of military operations, during the war it conquered the whole of the Galilee region, both the Lydda and Ramle areas, and the Negev. It also managed to secure, in the Battles of Latrun, a road linking Jerusalem to Israel. However, the neighboring Arab countries signed the 1949 Armistice Agreements that ended the war, and have recognized de facto the new borders of Israel. In this phase, 350,000 more Arab Palestinians fled or were expelled from the conquered areas.

=== Partition of former Mandatory territory ===
The Arabs rejected the Partition Plan while the Jews ostensibly accepted it. Following the 1948 Arab–Israeli War, the area allocated to the Palestinian Arabs and the international zone of Jerusalem were occupied by Israel and the neighboring Arab states in accordance with the terms of the 1949 Armistice Agreements. In addition to the UN-partitioned area allotted to the Jewish state, Israel captured and incorporated a further 26% of the British Mandate territory.

Jordan retained possession of about 21% of the former Mandate territory. Jerusalem was divided, with Jordan taking the eastern parts, including the Old City, and Israel taking the western parts. Syria held on to small slivers of the former Mandate territory to the south and east of the Sea of Galilee, which had been allocated in the UN partition plan to the Jewish state. For a description of the massive population movements, Arab and Jewish, at the time of the 1948 war and over the following decades, see Palestinian exodus and Jewish exodus from Arab lands.

=== Palestinian governorship in Egyptian-controlled Gaza ===
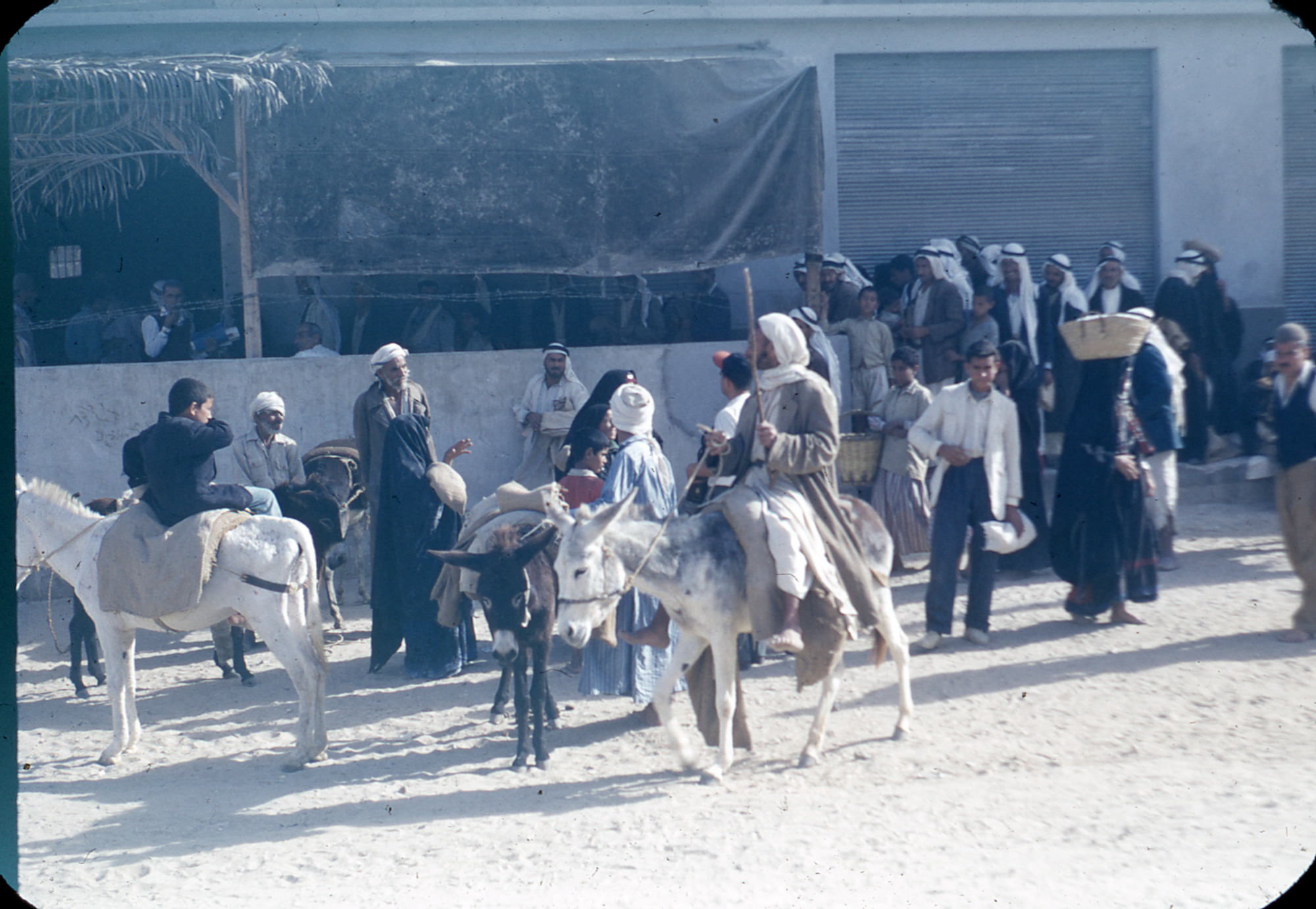
People in the Gaza Strip in 1956

On the same day that the State of Israel was announced, the Arab League announced that it would set up a single Arab civil administration throughout Palestine.

The All-Palestine Government was established by the Arab League on 22 September 1948, during the 1948 Arab–Israeli War. The Palestinian National Council convened in Gaza City and declared the independence of Palestine on 1 October 1948. It was soon recognized by all Arab League members, except Jordan. Though jurisdiction of the Government was declared to cover the whole of the former Mandatory Palestine with Jerusalem as its capital, its effective jurisdiction was limited to the Gaza Strip. The Prime Minister of the Gaza-seated administration was named Ahmed Hilmi Pasha, and the President was named Hajj Amin al-Husseini, former chairman of the Arab Higher Committee.

The All-Palestine Government is regarded by some as the first attempt to establish an independent Palestinian state. It was under official Egyptian protection, but, on the other hand, it had no executive role, but rather mostly political and symbolic. Its importance gradually declined, especially due to relocation of seat of government from Gaza to Cairo following Israeli incursions in late 1948. Though Gaza Strip returned under Egyptian control later on through the war, the All-Palestine Government remained in-exile in Cairo, managing Gazan affairs from outside.

In 1959, the All-Palestine Government was officially merged into the United Arab Republic, coming under formal Egyptian military administration, with the appointment of Egyptian military administrators in Gaza. Egypt both formally and informally denounced any and all territorial claims to Palestinian territory, in contrast to the government of Transjordan, which declared its annexation of the Palestinian West Bank. The All-Palestine Government's credentials as a bona fide sovereign state were questioned by many, particularly due to the effective reliance upon not only Egyptian military support, but Egyptian political and economic power.

=== Annexation of the West Bank of Jordan ===
Shortly after the proclamation of All-Palestine Government in Gaza, the Jericho Conference named Abdullah I of Transjordan, "King of Arab Palestine". The Congress called for the union of Arab Palestine and Transjordan and Abdullah announced his intention to annex the West Bank. The other Arab League member states opposed Abdullah's plan.

The New Historians, like Avi Shlaim, hold that there was an unwritten secret agreement between King Abdullah of Transjordan and Israeli authorities to partition the territory between themselves, and that this translated into each side limiting their objectives and exercising mutual restraint during the 1948 war.

The presence of a large number of immigrants and refugees from the now dissolved Mandate of Palestine fueled the regional ambitions of King Abdullah I, who sought control over what had been the British Jerusalem and Samaria districts on the West Bank of the Jordan River. Towards this goal the king granted Jordanian citizenship to all Arab holders of the Palestinian Mandate identity documents in February 1949, and outlawed the terms "Palestinian" and "Transjordanian" from official usage, changing the country's name from the Emirate of Trans-Jordan to the Hashemite Kingdom of Jordan.

The area east of the river became known as al-Ḍiffah al-Sharqiyya, or "The East Bank". In April 1950, with the formal annexation of the positions held by the Jordanian Army since 1948, the area became known as al-Ḍiffah al-Gharbiyya or "The Western Bank". With the formal union of the East and West Banks in 1950, the number of Palestinians in the kingdom rose by another 720,000, of whom 440,000 were West Bank residents and 280,000 were refugees from other areas of the former Mandate then living on the West Bank. Palestinians became the majority in Jordan although most believed their return to what was now the state of Israel was imminent.

== Israel and the occupied Palestinian territories ==
=== Six-Day War and Yom Kippur War ===
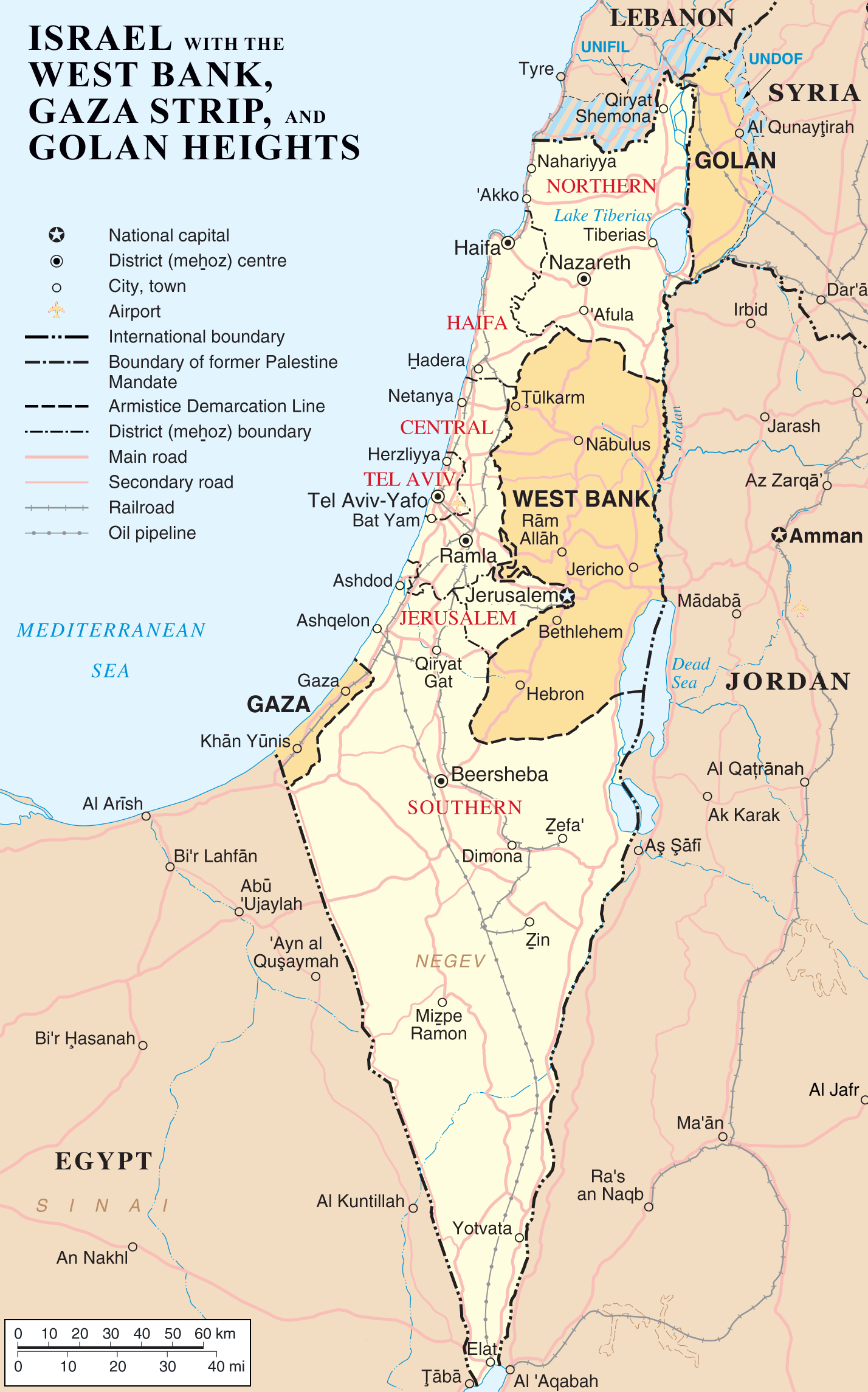
The region today: Israel, the West Bank, the Gaza Strip and the Golan Heights

In the course of the Six-Day War in June 1967, Israel captured the rest of the area that had been part of the British Mandate of Palestine, taking the West Bank (including East Jerusalem) from Jordan and the Gaza Strip from Egypt. Following military threats by Egypt and Syria, including Egyptian president Nasser's demand of the UN to remove its peace-keeping troops from the Egyptian-Israeli border, in June 1967 Israeli forces went to action against Egypt, Syria and Jordan.

As a result of that war, the Israel Defense Forces conquered the West Bank, the Gaza Strip, the Golan Heights, and the Sinai Peninsula bringing them under military rule. Israel also pushed Arab forces back from East Jerusalem, which Jews had not been permitted to visit during the prior Jordanian rule. East Jerusalem was allegedly annexed by Israel as part of its capital, though this action has not been recognized internationally. Israel also started building settlements on the occupied land.

The United Nations Security Council passed Resolution 242, promoting the "land for peace" formula, which called for Israeli withdrawal from territories occupied in 1967, in return for the end of all states of belligerency by the aforementioned Arab League nations. Palestinians continued longstanding demands for the destruction of Israel or made a new demand for self-determination in a separate independent Arab state in the West Bank and Gaza Strip similar to but smaller than the original Partition area that Palestinians and the Arab League had rejected for statehood in 1947.

In the 1973 Yom Kippur War, military forces of Egypt crossed the Suez canal and Syria to regain the Golan heights. The attacking military forces of Syria were pushed back. After a cease fire, Egyptian President Sadat Anwar Sadat started peace talks with the U.S. and Israel. Israel returned the Sinai Peninsula to Egypt as part of the 1978 Camp David Peace Accords between Egypt and Israel.

=== First Intifada, Oslo Accords and the State of Palestine ===
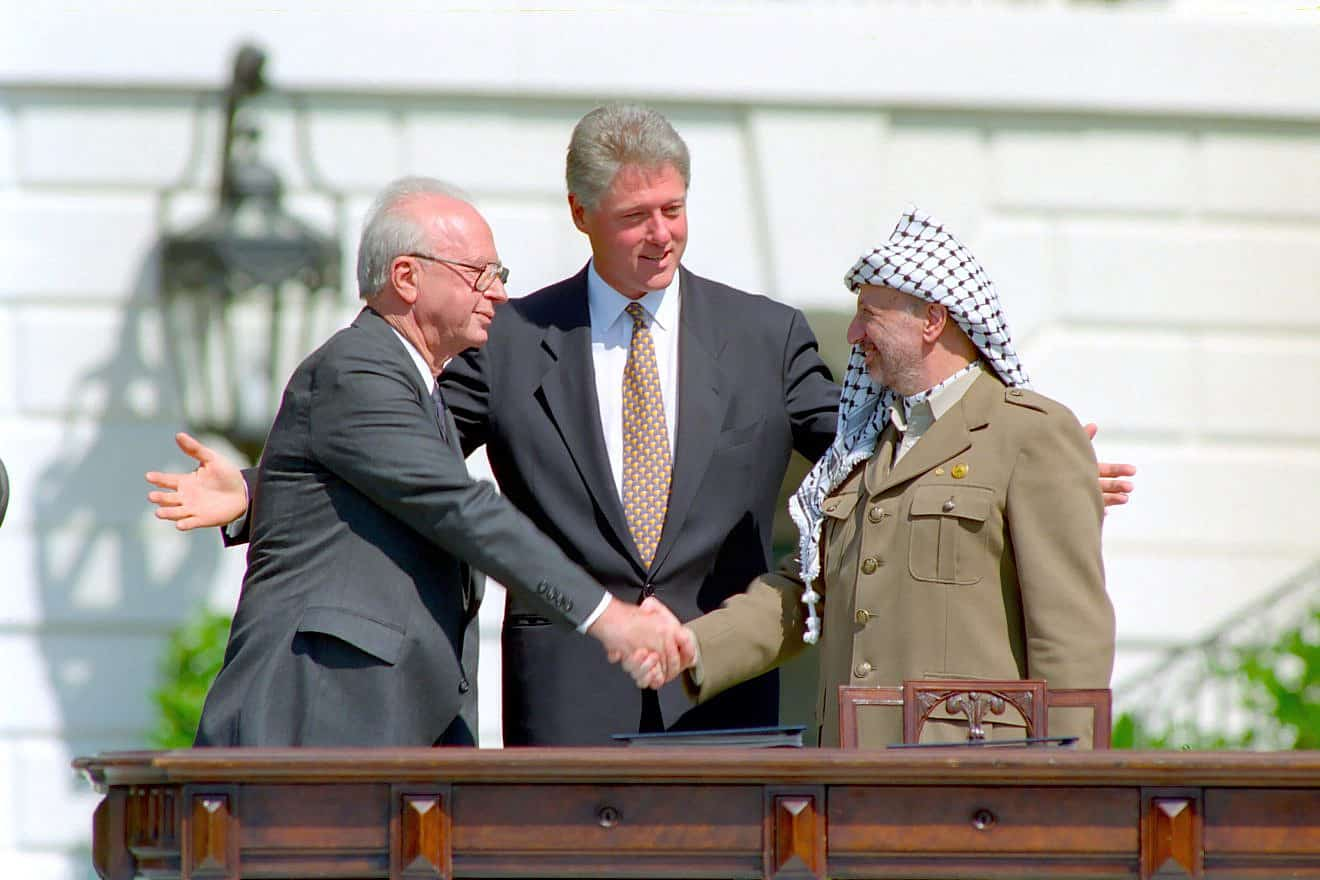
Yitzhak Rabin, Bill Clinton, and Yasser Arafat at the Oslo Accords signing ceremony on 13 September 1993

From 1987 to 1993, the First Palestinian Intifada against Israel took place. Attempts at the Israeli–Palestinian peace process were made at the Madrid Conference of 1991.

Following the historic 1993 Oslo Peace Accords between Palestinians and Israel (the "Oslo Accords"), which gave the Palestinians limited self-rule in some parts of the occupied territories through the Palestinian Authority, and other detailed negotiations, proposals for a Palestinian state gained momentum. They were soon followed in 1993 by the Israel–Jordan peace treaty.

=== Second Intifada and later ===
After a few years of on-and-off negotiations, the Palestinians began an uprising against Israel. This was known as the Al-Aqsa Intifada. The events were highlighted in world media by Palestinian suicide bombings in Israel that killed many civilians, and by Israeli Security Forces full-fledged invasions into civilian areas along with some targeted killings of Palestinian militant leaders and organizers. Israel began building a complex security barrier to block suicide bombers crossing into Israel from the West Bank in 2002.

Also in 2002, the Road map for peace calling for the resolution of the Israeli–Palestinian conflict was proposed by a "quartet": the United States, European Union, Russia, and United Nations. U.S. president George W. Bush in a speech on 24 June 2002, called for an independent Palestinian state living side by side with Israel in peace. Bush was the first U.S. president to explicitly call for such a Palestinian state.

Following Israel's unilateral disengagement plan of 2004, it withdrew all settlers and most of the military presence from the Gaza strip, but maintained control of the air space and coast. Israel also dismantled four settlements in northern West Bank in September 2005.

=== Gaza-West Bank split ===
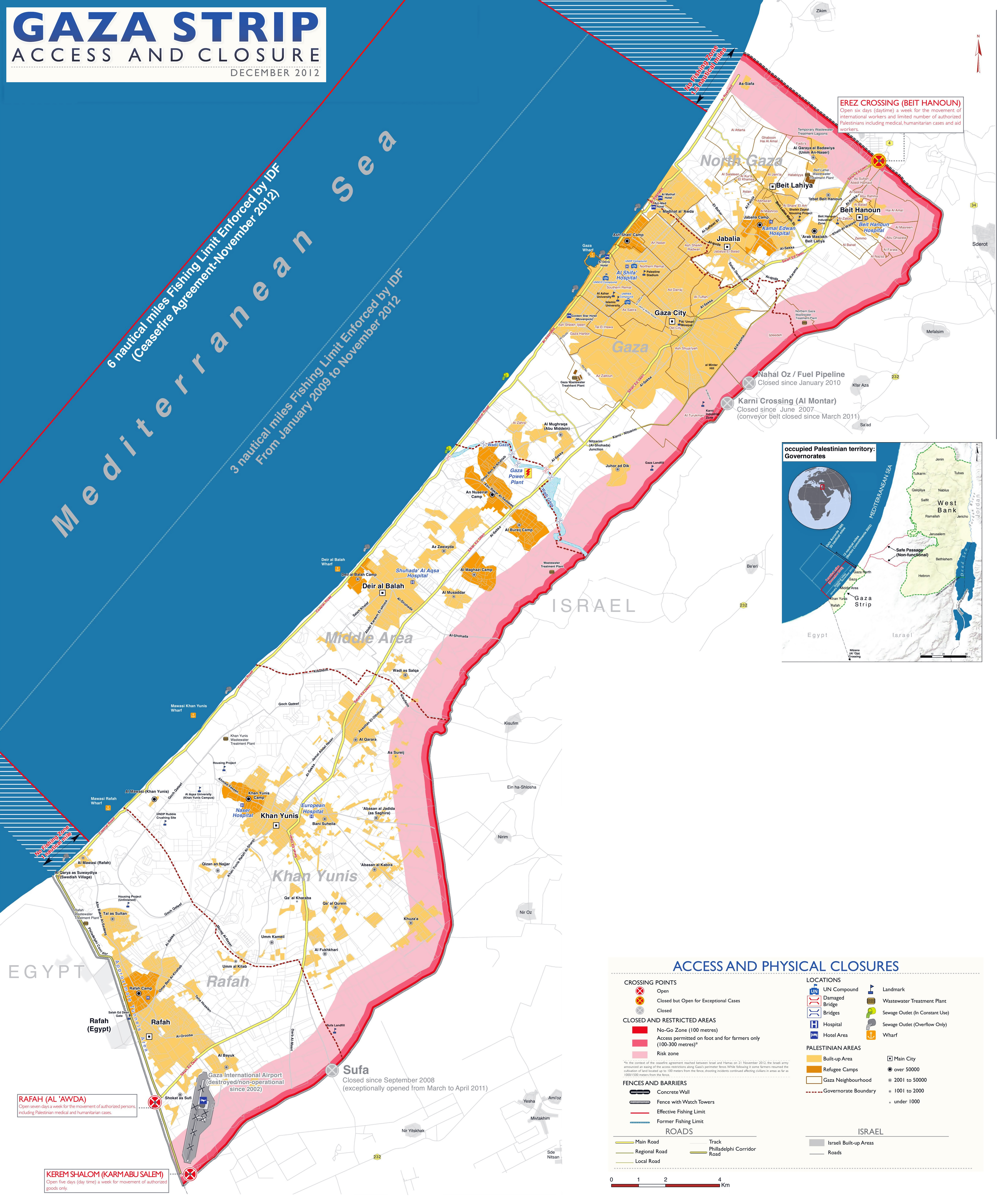
The Gaza Strip with Israeli-controlled borders and limited fishing zone, December 2012

A map of the West Bank, May 2021, showing Palestinian and Israeli control.

On 25 January 2006, Palestinian legislative elections were held in order to elect the second Palestinian Legislative Council, the legislature of the Palestinian Authority (PA). Hamas won the election, securing 74 of the 132 seats while its rival Fatah only won 45 seats. The outcome of the election shocked the world and meant that Hamas would take over most of PA's institutions. Hamas tried to form a unity government with Fatah, but the offer was rebuffed. Meanwhile, Israel and the US imposed sanctions on the PA in order to destabilize the Palestinian government so that it would fail and new elections would be called. Those efforts were ultimately unsuccessful but lead to a rift between Hamas and Fatah.

In June 2006, Palestinian militants affiliated with Hamas carried out a cross-border raid from Gaza into Israel through a tunnel dug for the purpose of attacking Israel. An Israeli soldier, Gilad Shalit, was captured and taken to Gaza by the militants. He would be held for five years until he was released in 2011 in exchange for over 1,000 Palestinian prisoners imprisoned by Israel. The raid caused Israel to make several large-scale invasions of Gaza in the summer and autumn of 2006 attempting to rescue their captured soldier. Over 500 Palestinians and 11 Israelis were killed during the hostilities but ultimately they were unsuccessful in retrieving Shalit.

Relations between Hamas and Fatah deteriorated further as Palestinian President Mahmoud Abbas attempted to dismiss the Hamas-led coalition government in June 2007. Hamas objected to this move being illegal and street battles between Hamas and Fatah members broke out in what came to be known as the 2007 Battle of Gaza. Hamas emerged victorious and took control of the Gaza Strip.

From that point on, governance of the Palestinian territories were split between Hamas and Fatah. Hamas, branded an Islamist terror organization by the EU and several Western countries, in control of Gaza and Fatah in control of the West Bank.

In July 2009, approximately 305,000 Israelis lived in 121 settlements in the West Bank. The 2.4 million West Bank Palestinians (according to Palestinian evaluations) live primarily in four blocs centered in Hebron, Ramallah, Nablus, and Jericho.

=== Observer status of State of Palestine ===
On 23 September 2011, President Mahmoud Abbas on behalf of the Palestine Liberation Organisation submitted an application for membership of Palestine in the United Nations. The campaign, dubbed "Palestine 194", was formally backed by the Arab League in May, and was officially confirmed by the PLO on 26 June. The decision was labelled by the Israeli government as a unilateral step, while the Palestinian government countered that it is essential to overcoming the current impasse. Several other countries, such as Germany and Canada, have also denounced the decision and called for a prompt return to negotiations. Many others, however, such as Norway and Russia, have endorsed the plan, as has UN secretary-General Ban Ki-moon, who stated, "UN members are entitled whether to vote for or against the Palestinian statehood recognition at the UN."

In July 2012, it was reported that Hamas Government in Gaza was considering declaring the independence of the Gaza Strip with the help of Egypt. In August 2012, Foreign Minister of the PNA Riyad al-Malki told reporters in Ramallah that PNA would renew effort to upgrade the Palestinian (PLO) status to "full member state" at the U.N. General Assembly on 27 September 2012. By September 2012, with their application for full membership stalled due to the inability of Security Council members to "make a unanimous recommendation", Palestine had decided to pursue an upgrade in status from "observer entity" to "non-member observer state".

On 27 November, it was announced that the appeal had been officially made, and would be put to a vote in the General Assembly on 29 November, where their status upgrade was expected to be supported by a majority of states. In addition to granting Palestine "non-member observer state status", the draft resolution "expresses the hope that the Security Council will consider favourably the application submitted on 23 September 2011 by the State of Palestine for admission to full membership in the United Nations, endorses the two state solution based on the pre-1967 borders, and stresses the need for an immediate resumption of negotiations between the two parties".

State of Palestine Countries that have recognised the State of Palestine Countries that have not recognised the State of Palestine

On 29 November 2012, in a 138–9 vote (with 41 abstaining), General Assembly resolution 67/19 passed, upgrading Palestine to "non-member observer state" status in the United Nations. The new status equates Palestine's with that of the Holy See. The change in status was described by The Independent as "de facto recognition of the sovereign state of Palestine".

The UN has permitted Palestine to title its representative office to the UN as "The Permanent Observer Mission of the State of Palestine to the United Nations", and Palestine has started to re-title its name accordingly on postal stamps, official documents and passports, whilst it has instructed its diplomats to officially represent "The State of Palestine", as opposed to the "Palestine National Authority". Additionally, on 17 December 2012, UN Chief of Protocol Yeocheol Yoon decided that "the designation of "State of Palestine" shall be used by the Secretariat in all official United Nations documents", thus recognising the PLO-proclaimed State of Palestine as being sovereign over the territories Palestine and its citizens under international law.

By February 2013, 131 (67.9%) of the 193 member states of the United Nations had recognised the State of Palestine. Many of the countries that do not recognise the State of Palestine nevertheless recognise the PLO as the "representative of the Palestinian people".

== See also ==
- Architecture of Palestine
- Demographic history of Palestine (region)
- History of ancient Israel and Judah
- History of Gaza City
- History of Israel
- History of the ancient Levant
- History of the Gaza Strip
- History of the Jews and Judaism in the Land of Israel
- History of the Middle East
- Levantine archaeology (including useful periodisation)
- Shaam
- Timeline of Jerusalem
- Timeline of the demographics of Palestine (region)
- Timeline of the name Palestine
- Timeline of the Palestine region
- Time periods in the Palestine region

== Sources ==
=== News media ===
- Ahren, Raphael (30 November 2017). "Jerusalem ignores the UN's forgotten partition plan of 2012 at its peril". The Times of Israel. Archived from the original on 22 June 2020.
- Al-Tahhan, Zena (2 November 2018). "More than a century on: The Balfour Declaration explained". Al Jazeera. Archived from the original on 7 November 2023.
- "Arab League Requests Palestinian Statehood from U.N". Palestine News Network. 6 July 2011. Archived from the original on 14 August 2014.
- Ashkar, Alaa; Bannoura, Saed (9 September 2011). "UN Secretary-General Supports Full Palestinian Membership". IMEMC News. International Middle East Media Center. Archived from the original on 15 October 2011.
- Ateeq, Mounir (31 July 2012). "Report of possible Gaza independence stirs debate". Al Arabiya. Archived from the original on 14 October 2012.
- Baroud, Ramzy (July 2007). "Gaza: chaos foretold". Le Monde diplomatique. Archived from the original on 3 January 2010.
- Ben Zion, Ilan (9 April 2014). "Egyptian coffin, gold seal with king's name found in Israel". The Times of Israel. Archived from the original on 11 April 2014.
- Cohen, Shaye I.D. (18 November 2015). "Legitimization Under Constantine". PBS. Archived from the original on 14 January 2021.
- Ein-Gil, Ehud (4 December 2015). "Revisiting the UN Partition Plan: Is It Still Relevant?". Haaretz. Archived from the original on 16 May 2020. "The leadership of the Yishuv – the Zionist settlement enterprise in Palestine – and the Jewish Agency – the executive body of the World Zionist Organization – seemingly accepted the partition plan, but did not come to terms with the international status that was to be bestowed on Jerusalem, an inseparable part of the plan, nor accept the proposed borders of the partitioned states."
- Levinson, Chaim (27 July 2009). "IDF: More than 300,000 settlers live in West Bank". Haaretz. Archived from the original on 3 December 2009.
- "Palestine: What is in a name (change)?". Inside Story. Al Jazeera. 8 January 2013. Archived from the original on 21 March 2020.
- "Palestinian Authority officially changes name to 'State of Palestine'". Haaretz. Associated Press. 5 January 2013. Archived from the original on 8 February 2015.
- Perry, Mark; Crooke, Alastair (9 January 2007). "No-goodniks and the Palestinian shootout". Asia Times. Archived from the original on 9 January 2007.
- Sawafta, A. (14 July 2011). "Arabs to seek full Palestinian upgrade at UN". Reuters. Archived from the original on 15 September 2011.
- Sawafta, Ali (4 August 2012). "Palestinians to renew U.N. statehood drive in September". Al Arabiya. Reuters. Archived from the original on 1 March 2013.
- Schell, Bernhard (31 July 2011). "UN will count 194 members if Palestine gets in". InDepthNews. Archived from the original on 3 August 2017.
- Steiman, Daniel (29 December 2013). "The settlements are illegal under international law". The Jerusalem Post. Archived from the original on 15 January 2015.
- Williams, Dan (1 December 2012). "Israel defies UN after vote on Palestine with plans for 3,000 new homes in the West Bank". The Independent. Archived from the original on 18 October 2017.
- "Zionist Aspirations: Dr Weizmann on the Future of Palestine". The Times. 8 May 1920. p. 15.

=== Online sources ===
- "1941 The Palmach formed". History Central. n.d. Archived from the original on 13 April 2023.
- Bar-Ilan, Meir (2013). "Major trends in Jewish Society in the Land of Israel: From the 5th century BCE till the 7th century CE". Bar-Ilan University. Archived from the original on 21 May 2022.
- Ben-Arieh, Alex (n.d.). "Uniform (and History) of Jewish Palestine Police "Noter"". The Historama. Archived from the original on 11 August 2022.
- Ben-Ghedalia, Yochai (2009). "The Habsburgs and the Jewish Philanthropy in Jerusalem during the Crimean War (1853–6)" (PDF). Jerusalem: The Hebrew University of Jerusalem. Archived from the original (PDF) on 5 September 2012.
- "The Crusades (1095–1291)". Heilbrunn Timeline of Art History. New York: Department of Medieval Art and The Cloisters at the Metropolitan Museum of Art. February 2014. Archived from the original on 23 March 2022.
- "Dio's Roman History (books 61–70)". Translated by Earnest Cary. London: Loeb Classical Library. 1925. pp. 449–451 – via Internet Archive.
- "Etzel – The Establishment of Irgun". The Irgun Site. n.d. Archived from the original on 7 November 2020.
- Gee, John (February 2000). "The borders between Syria and Israel". CAABU Focus. Vol. 6, no. 1. CAABU. Archived from the original on 22 January 2001.
- Gharib, Ali (20 December 2012). "U.N. Adds New Name: "State of Palestine"". The Daily Beast. Archived from the original on 21 December 2012.
- Harrison, Timothy P. (2009). "'The land of Medeba' and Early Iron Age Mādabā". In Bienkowski, Piotr (ed.). Studies on Iron Age Moab and Neighbouring Areas: In Honour of Michèle Daviau (PDF). Leuven – Paris – Walpole, MA: Peeters. pp. 27–45. Archived (PDF) from the original on 16 May 2018.
- "The Hazor Excavations Project". The Hebrew University of Jerusalem. 12 January 2017. Archived from the original on 7 May 2019.
- Jarus, Owen (16 July 2016). "Who Were the Philistines?". livescience.com. Archived from the original on 26 January 2021.
- Kimmerling, Baruch (n.d.). "Benny Morris's Shocking Interview". History News Network. Archived from the original on 30 March 2019. "they officially accepted the partition plan, but invested all their efforts towards improving its terms and maximally expanding their boundaries while reducing the number of Arabs in them."
- "Land Registration in Palestine before 1948 (Nakba): Table 2". Palestine Remembered. n.d. Archived from the original on 18 June 2021.
- Lapidot, Yehuda (9 September 2015). "Why Italian Planes Bombed Tel-Aviv?". IsraCast. Archived from the original on 29 October 2020.
- Lawler, Andrew (28 May 2020). "DNA from the Bible's Canaanites lives on in modern Arabs and Jews". National Geographic. Archived from the original on 1 June 2020.
- "Lion reliefs". The Israel Museum, Jerusalem. 7 October 2021. Archived from the original on 3 January 2022.
- "New Aliyah – Modern Zionist Aliyot (1882–1948)". Jewish Agency for Israel. n.d. Archived from the original on 23 June 2009.
- "The Palestine Mandate". Yale Law School – The Avalon Project. n.d.
- "Remains of Minoan-Style Painting Discovered During Excavations of Canaanite Palace". ScienceDaily. 7 December 2009. Archived from the original on 4 February 2019.
- "Restraint and Retaliation". The Irgun Site. n.d. Archived from the original on 27 April 2011.
- "The Second Aliyah (1904–1914)". Gov.il. Ministry of Aliyah and Integration. 2 December 2020. Archived from the original on 13 June 2022.
- "Who were the Canaanites? New insight from 73 ancient genomes". ScienceDaily. 28 May 2020. Archived from the original on 31 May 2020.

=== Primary sources ===
- Covenant of the League of Nations#Article 22 – via Wikisource.
- "A/RES/181(II): 29 November 1947: Resolution 181 (II): Future government of Palestine". United Nations General Assembly. Archived from the original on 24 May 2012.
- "Declaration of Establishment of State of Israel: 14 May 1948". Israeli Ministry of Foreign Affairs. Archived from the original on 21 March 2012.
- No. 565. – Exchange of Notes * Constituting an Agreement Between the British and French Governments Respecting the Boundary Line Between Syria and Palestine from the Mediterranean to El Hammé (PDF). Paris: British and French governments. 7 March 1923. p. 7. Archived from the original (PDF) on 9 September 2008.
- "Permanent Observer Mission of the State of Palestine to the United Nations". 2012. Archived from the original on 31 January 2013.

=== General ===
- Ben Yosef, Avraham (1981). מבוא לתולדות הלשון העברית [Introduction to the History of the Hebrew Language] (in Hebrew). Tel Aviv: אור־עם. p. 38.
- Ben-Sasson, H.H. (1976). A History of the Jewish People. Harvard University Press. ISBN 0-674-39731-2. "In an effort to wipe out all memory of the bond between the Jews and the land, Hadrian changed the name of the province from Iudaea to Syria-Palestina, a name that became common in non-Jewish literature."
- Doumani, Beshara (1995). Rediscovering Palestine: Merchants and Peasants in Jabal Nablus, 1700–1900. University of California Press. ISBN 978-0-520-08895-5.
- Elayi, Josette (2017). Sargon II, King of Assyria. Atlanta: Society of Biblical Literature Press. ISBN 978-1-62837-177-2.
- Filiu, Jean-Pierre (2014). Gaza: A History. Oxford University Press. ISBN 978-0-19-020189-0. Archived from the original on 17 April 2023.
- Heynick, Frank (2002). Jews and medicine, An Epic Saga. KTAV Publishing House. ISBN 978-0-88125-773-1.
- Kletter, Raz (2003). "A very general archaeologist: Moshe Dayan and Israeli archaeology" (PDF). The Journal of Hebrew Scriptures. 4. doi:10.5508/jhs.2002.v4.a5. Archived from the original (PDF) on 3 December 2013.
- Krämer, Gudrun (2011). A History of Palestine: From the Ottoman Conquest to the Founding of the State of Israel. Princeton University Press. ISBN 978-0-691-15007-9.
- Mattar, Phillip (2005). Encyclopedia of the Palestinians. Facts on File. ISBN 978-0-8160-6986-6.
- Magness, Jodi (2024). Jerusalem Through The Ages: From Its Beginnings To The Crusades. Oxford University Press. ISBN 978-0-19-093780-5. Archived from the original on 8 December 2024.
- Noonan, Benjamin J. (2019). Non-Semitic Loanwords in the Hebrew Bible: A Lexicon of Language Contact. Penn State Press. ISBN 978-1-64602-039-3. Archived from the original on 19 December 2023.
- Philipp, Thomas (1998). The Syrian Land: Processes of Integration and Fragmentation: Bilād Al-Shām from the 18th to the 20th Century. Franz Steiner Verlag. ISBN 978-3-515-07309-7. Archived from the original on 19 December 2023.
- Pletcher, Kenneth (n.d.). "Sea of Galilee". Encyclopædia Britannica. Archived from the original on 21 June 2022.
- Sáenz-Badillos, Angel (1993). A History of the Hebrew Language. Cambridge University Press. ISBN 978-0-521-55634-7.
- Scharfstein, Sol (1997). Chronicle of Jewish History: From the Patriarchs to the 21st Century. Ktav Publishing House. p. 231. ISBN 0-88125-545-9.
- Shahin, Mariam (2005). Palestine: A Guide. Interlink Books. ISBN 1-56656-557-X – via Internet Archive.
- Sharon, Moshe (2009). Handbook of Oriental Studies: The Near and Middle East. Corpus inscriptionum Arabicarum Palaestinae. Vol. 4. Leiden; Boston: Brill. ISBN 978-90-04-17085-8. Archived from the original on 19 December 2023.
- Silberman, Neil Asher; Levy, Thomas E.; Wisthoff, Bonnie L.; Tappy, Ron E.; Meloy, John L. (1996). "Near East". In Fagan, Brian M. (ed.). The Oxford Companion to Archaeology. Oxford Companions. Oxford University Press. ISBN 978-0-19-507618-9.
- Sluglett, Peter, ed. (2014). The Urban Social History of the Middle East, 1750–1950. Syracuse University Press. ISBN 978-0-8156-5063-8. Archived from the original on 19 December 2023.
- Steiner, Margreet L.; Killebrew, Ann E. (2013). The Oxford Handbook of the Archaeology of the Levant: c. 8000–332 BCE. OUP Oxford. pp. 2, 9. doi:10.1093/oxfordhb/9780199212972.001.0001. ISBN 978-0-19-921297-2.

=== Ancient history ===
- Adams, Samuel L. (2014). Social and Economic Life in Second Temple Judea. Presbyterian Publishing Corp. pp. 150–. ISBN 978-0-664-23703-5. Archived from the original on 19 December 2023.
- Agranat-Tamir, Lily; Waldman, Shamam; Martin, Mario A.S.; Gokhman, David; Mishol, Nadav; Eshel, Tzilla; et al. (28 May 2020). "The Genomic History of the Bronze Age Southern Levant". Cell. 181 (5): 1146–1157. doi:10.1016/j.cell.2020.04.024. PMC 10212583. PMID 32470400. S2CID 219105441.
- Ahlström, Gösta Werner (1994). The history of ancient Palestine. Fortress Press. ISBN 0-8006-2770-9. OCLC 704333266. Archived from the original on 19 December 2023.
- "Amud". Encyclopædia Britannica. n.d. Archived from the original on 19 November 2021.
- Avni, Gideon (2014). The Byzantine-Islamic Transition in Palestine: An Archaeological Approach. OUP Oxford. pp. 325ff. ISBN 978-0-19-968433-5. Archived from the original on 19 December 2023.
- Belfer-Cohen, A.; Bar-Yosef, O. (2000). "Early Sedentism in the Near East – A Bumpy Ride to Village Life". In Kuijt, Ian (ed.). Life in Neolithic Farming Communities. Social Organization, Identity, and Differentiation. Kluwer Academic/Plenum Publishers. pp. 19–37. ISBN 978-0-306-47166-7.
- Ben-Shlomo, David (2010). Philistine Iconography: A Wealth of Style and Symbolism. Saint-Paul. ISBN 978-3-525-54360-3. Archived from the original on 19 December 2023.
- Cline, Eric H. (2015). 1177 B.C.: the year civilization collapsed. Princeton: Princeton University Press. p. 93. ISBN 978-0-691-14089-6. OCLC 861542115.
- Dever, William G. (2001). What Did the Biblical Writers Know and When Did They Know It?: What Archeology Can Tell Us About the Reality of Ancient Israel. Wm. B. Eerdmans Publishing. pp. 118–119. ISBN 978-0-8028-2126-3. Archived from the original on 19 December 2023.
- Dothan, Trude (1978). Excavations at the cemetery of Deir el-Balah. Qedem. Vol. 10. Institute of Archaeology, Hebrew University of Jerusalem. JSTOR 43587093.
- Ember, Melvin; Peregrine, Peter Neal, eds. (2002). "Encyclopedia of Prehistory: Volume 8: South and Southwest Asia". Encyclopedia of Prehistory. Vol. 8: South and Southwest Asia. New York; London: Kluwer Academic/Plenum. p. 103. ISBN 0-306-46262-1.
- Faust, Avraham (2009). "How Did Israel Become a People?". Biblical Archaeology Review. 35 (6): 62–69. Archived from the original on 19 December 2023.
- Faust, Avraham (2016). Israel's Ethnogenesis: Settlement, Interaction, Expansion and Resistance. Routledge. ISBN 978-1-134-94208-4. Archived from the original on 1 July 2023.
- Finkelstein, Israel (2014). "The Southern Steppe of the Levant ca. 1050–750 BCE: a Framework for a Territorial History". Palestine Exploration Quarterly. 146 (2): 89–104. doi:10.1179/0031032814z.00000000092. ISSN 0031-0328. S2CID 162245680. Archived from the original on 19 December 2023.
- Finkelstein, Israel; Lipschits, Oded; Koch, Ido (2012). "The Biblical Gilead: Observations on Identifications, Geographic Divisions and Territorial History". In Kottsieper, Ingo; Dietrich, Manfried (eds.). Ugarit-Forschungen: Internationales Jahrbuch Für Die Altertumskunde Syrien-Palästinas. 2011. Band 43. Ugarit Verlag. p. 151. ISBN 978-3-86835-086-9. OCLC 1101929531. Archived from the original on 11 May 2023.
- Finkelstein, Israel; Mazar, Amihai (2007). Schmidt, Brian B. (ed.). The Quest for the Historical Israel: Debating Archaeology and the History of Early Israel. Invited Lectures Delivered at the Sixth Biennial Colloquium of the International Institute for Secular Humanistic Judaism, Detroit, October 2005. Atlanta: Society of Biblical Literature. ISBN 978-1-58983-277-0. Archived from the original on 11 May 2023.
- Finkelstein, Israel; Silberman, Neil Asher (2002). The Bible Unearthed: Archaeology's New Vision of Ancient Israel and the Origin of Sacred Texts. Simon and Schuster. ISBN 978-0-7432-2338-6. Archived from the original on 1 July 2023.
- Grabbe, Lester L. (2010). An Introduction to Second Temple Judaism: History and Religion of the Jews in the Time of Nehemiah, the Maccabees, Hillel, and Jesus. A&C Black. ISBN 978-0-567-55248-8. Archived from the original on 19 December 2023.
- Greenberg, Raphael (2019). The Archaeology of the Bronze Age Levant: From Urban Origins to the Demise of City-States, 3700–1000 ВСЕ. Cambridge World Archaeology. Cambridge University Press. doi:10.1017/9781316275993. ISBN 9781107111462.
- Haralson Hayes, John; Mandell, Sara (1998). The Jewish People in Classical Antiquity: From Alexander to Bar Kochba. Westminster John Knox Press. pp. 13–. ISBN 978-0-664-25727-9. Archived from the original on 19 December 2023.
- Hjelm, Ingrid (2010). "Mt. Gerizim and Samaritans in Recent Research". In Winkler, Waltraud (ed.). Samaritans: Past and Present: Current Studies. Walter de Gruyter. pp. 25–44. ISBN 978-3-11-019497-5. Archived from the original on 19 December 2023.
- Killebrew, Ann E. (2005). Biblical Peoples and Ethnicity: An Archaeological Study of Egyptians, Canaanites, Philistines, and Early Israel, 1300–1100 BCE. Archaeology and Biblical Studies. Society of Biblical Literature. p. 230. ISBN 978-1-58983-097-4.
- Knapp, A. Bernard; Manning, Sturt W. (1 January 2016). "Crisis in Context: The End of the Late Bronze Age in the Eastern Mediterranean". American Journal of Archaeology. 120 (1): 130. doi:10.3764/aja.120.1.0099. ISSN 0002-9114. S2CID 191385013. Archived from the original on 3 July 2024.
- Lemche, Niels Peter (31 December 2001). "On The Problems of Reconstructing Pre-Hellenistic Israelite (Palestinian) History". The Journal of Hebrew Scriptures. 3. doi:10.5508/jhs.2000.v3.a1.
- Lewis, Bernard (1980). "Palestine: On the History and Geography of a Name". The International History Review. 2 (1): 1–12. doi:10.1080/07075332.1980.9640202.
- Lynwood Smith, Daniel (2015). Into the World of the New Testament: Greco-Roman and Jewish Texts and Contexts. Bloomsbury Publishing. pp. 133–. ISBN 978-0-567-65742-8. Archived from the original on 3 July 2024.
- Magness, Jodi (2012). The Archaeology of the Holy Land: From the Destruction of Solomon's Temple to the Muslim Conquest. Cambridge University Press. ISBN 978-0-521-12413-3. Archived from the original on 3 July 2024.
- Masalha, Nur (2018). Palestine: A Four Thousand Year History. Bloomsbury Academic. ISBN 978-1-78699-274-1. Archived from the original on 3 July 2024.
- Mazar, Benjamin (1975). The Mountain of the Lord. Garden City, New York: Doubleday & Company. p. 45. ISBN 0-385-04843-2.
- McNutt, Paula (1999). Reconstructing the Society of Ancient Israel. Westminster John Knox Press. ISBN 978-0-664-22265-9. Archived from the original on 9 October 2023.
- Meyers, Eric M.; Chancey, Mark A. (2012). Alexander to Constantine: Archaeology of the Land of the Bible. Vol. III. Yale University Press. ISBN 978-0-300-14179-5. Archived from the original on 19 December 2023.
- de Miroschedji, Pierre; Sadeq, Moain (2005), "The frontier of Egypt in the Early Bronze Age: preliminary soundings at Tell es-Sakan (Gaza Strip)", in Clarke, Joanne (ed.), Archaeological Perspectives on the Transmission and Transformation of Culture in the Eastern Mediterranean, Council for British Research in the Levant, pp. 155–169, ISBN 978-1-84217-168-4, JSTOR j.ctv310vqks.24
- Noll, K. L. (2001). Canaan and Israel in Antiquity: An Introduction. London: Sheffield Academic Press. p. 164. ISBN 978-1-84127-318-1. Archived from the original on 1 July 2023. "It would seem that, in the eyes of Merneptah's artisans, Israel was a Canaanite group indistinguishable from all other Canaanite groups... It is likely that Merneptah's Israel was a group of Canaanites located in the Jezreel Valley."
- Noll, K. L. (2013). Canaan and Israel in Antiquity: A Textbook on History and Religion. Bloomsbury Publishing. pp. 340–. ISBN 978-0-567-18258-6. Archived from the original on 19 December 2023.
- Olson, Steve (2003). Mapping Human History: Discovering the Past through Our Genes. New York: Houghton Mifflin. pp. 74–75. ISBN 978-0-7475-6174-3.
- "Palestine: Middle Bronze Age". Encyclopædia Britannica. Archived from the original on 14 September 2007.
- Perdue, Leo G.; Carter, Warren (2015). Israel and Empire: A Postcolonial History of Israel and Early Judaism. Bloomsbury Publishing. ISBN 978-0-567-28051-0. Archived from the original on 19 December 2023.
- Propp, William H. (1993). "Amarna Letters". In Metzger, Bruce M.; Coogan, Michael D. (eds.). The Oxford Companion to the Bible. Oxford Companions. Oxford University Press. ISBN 978-0-19-504645-8.
- Schäfer, Peter (2003). The History of the Jews in the Greco-Roman World. Psychology Press. ISBN 978-0-415-30585-3.
- Schipper, Bernd U. (2011). "Egyptian Imperialism After The New Kingdom: The 26th Dynasty and the Southern Levant". Egypt, Canaan and Israel: History, Imperialism, Ideology and Literature. BRILL. pp. 268–290. doi:10.1163/ej.9789004194939.i-370.99. ISBN 978-90-04-21069-1.
- Schwartz, Seth (2009). Imperialism and Jewish Society: 200 B.C.E. to 640 C.E. Princeton University Press. ISBN 978-1-4008-2485-4. Archived from the original on 19 December 2023.
- Škerlj, B. (1960). "Human Evolution and Neanderthal Man" (PDF). Antiquity. 34 (134): 90–99. doi:10.1017/S0003598X00035377. S2CID 163810659. Archived from the original on 19 December 2023.
- Tesch, Noah (2017). "Aramaic language". Encyclopædia Britannica. Archived from the original on 27 April 2015.
- Tubb, Jonathan N. (1998). Canaanites. University of Oklahoma Press. p. 40. ISBN 0-8061-3108-X – via Internet Archive. "The Canaanites and Their Land."
- Wenning, Robert (2007). "The Nabataeans in History (Before AD 106)". In Politis, Konstantinos D. (ed.). The World of the Nabataeans. Vol. 2 of the International Conference, The World of the Herods and the Nabataeans, Held at the British Museum, 17–19 April 2001. Franz Steiner Verlag. ISBN 978-3-515-08816-9. Archived from the original on 19 December 2023.

==== Assyrian period ====
- Bagg, Ariel M. (2013). "Palestine under Assyrian Rule: A New Look at the Assyrian Imperial Policy in the West". Journal of the American Oriental Society. 133 (1): 119–144. doi:10.7817/jameroriesoci.133.1.0119. JSTOR 10.7817/jameroriesoci.133.1.0119. Gale A337529852 ProQuest 1398770895.
- Finkelstein, Israel (28 June 2015). "Migration of Israelites into Judah after 720 BCE: An Answer and an Update". Zeitschrift für die alttestamentliche Wissenschaft. 127 (2): 188–206. doi:10.1515/zaw-2015-0011. ISSN 1613-0103. S2CID 171178702. Archived from the original on 4 January 2022.
- Leithart, Peter J. (2006). 1 & 2 Kings (Brazos Theological Commentary on the Bible). Baker Publishing Group. pp. 255–256. ISBN 978-1-4412-3560-2.
- Pritchard, James B., ed. (1965). Ancient Near Eastern Texts Related to the Old Testament. Princeton, NJ: Princeton University Press. pp. 287–288.
- Schneider, Tammi J. (31 October 2011). "Through Assyria's Eyes: Israel's Relationship with Judah". Expedition Magazine. Vol. 44, no. 3. Archived from the original on 18 July 2022.
- Younger, K. Lawson (1998). "The Deportations of the Israelites". Journal of Biblical Literature. 117 (2): 201–227. doi:10.2307/3266980. ISSN 0021-9231. JSTOR 3266980.

==== Babylonian period ====
- Lipschits, Oled (2005). The Fall and Rise of Jerusalem: Judah under Babylonian Rule. Winona Lake: Eisenbrauns. ISBN 978-1-57506-095-8. Archived from the original on 19 December 2023.
- Saggs, Henry W.F. (2010). "Nebuchadnezzar II – Biography, Accomplishments, & Facts". Encyclopædia Britannica. Archived from the original on 18 January 2020.

==== Persian period ====
- Bowman, Alan K. (2020). "Ancient Egypt – Egypt under Achaemenid rule". Encyclopædia Britannica. Archived from the original on 20 June 2015.
- Crotty, Robert Brian (2017). The Christian Survivor: How Roman Christianity Defeated Its Early Competitors. Springer. p. 25 f.n. 4. ISBN 978-981-10-3214-1. Archived from the original on 19 December 2023. "The Babylonians translated the Hebrew name [Judah] into Aramaic as Yehud Medinata ('the province of Judah') or simply 'Yehud' and made it a new Babylonian province. This was inherited by the Persians. Under the Greeks, Yehud was translated as Judaea and this was taken over by the Romans. After the Jewish rebellion of 135 CE, the Romans renamed the area Syria Palaestina or simply Palestine. The area described by these land titles differed to some extent in the different periods."
- Ephal, Israel (1998). "Changes in Palestine during the Persian Period in Light of Epigraphic Sources". Israel Exploration Journal. 48 (1/2): 106–119. JSTOR 27926503. Archived from the original on 1 October 2021.
- Ephal, Israel (2000). "Syria-Palestine under Achaemenid Rule". The Cambridge Ancient History. Vol. 11. Cambridge University Press. pp. 139–. ISBN 978-0-521-22804-6. Archived from the original on 19 December 2023.
- Grabbe, Lester L. (2004). A History of the Jews and Judaism in the Second Temple Period: Yehud – A History of the Persian Province of Judah v. 1. T & T Clark. p. 355. ISBN 978-0-567-08998-4. Archived from the original on 19 December 2023.
- Grabbe, Lester L. (2006). A History of the Jews and Judaism in the Second Temple Period (vol. 1): The Persian Period (539–331BCE). Bloomsbury Academic. pp. 85–. ISBN 978-0-567-04352-8. Archived from the original on 19 December 2023.
- Hübner, Ulrich (2014). "The development of monetary systems in Palestine during the Achaemenid and Hellenistic Eras". In Hagen, Jürgen von; Welker, Michael (eds.). Money as God?: The Monetisation of the Market and its Impact on Religion, Politics, Law and Ethics. Cambridge University Press. pp. 164–. ISBN 978-1-107-04300-8. Archived from the original on 19 December 2023.
- Lendering, Jona. "Cyrus the Great". Livius. Archived from the original on 12 November 2020.
- Lipschits, Oded (2006). "Achaemenid Imperial Policy and the Status of Jerusalem". In Lipschits, Oded; Oeming, Manfred (eds.). Judah and the Judeans in the Persian Period. Pennsylvania State University Press. pp. 19–52. ISBN 978-1-57506-250-1. Archived from the original on 19 December 2023.
- Shen, Peidong; Lavi, Tal; Kivisild, Toomas; Chou, Vivian; Sengun, Deniz; Gefel, Dov; et al. (2004). "Reconstruction of patrilineages and matrilineages of Samaritans and other Israeli populations from Y-Chromosome and mitochondrial DNA sequence Variation". Human Mutation. 24 (3): 248–260. doi:10.1002/humu.20077. ISSN 1059-7794. PMID 15300852. S2CID 1571356. Archived from the original on 1 July 2023.
- Stern, Ephraim (1984). "The Persian Empire and the Political and Social History of Palestine in the Persian Period". In Davies, William Donald; Finkelstein, Louis (eds.). The Cambridge History of Judaism: Volume 1, Introduction: The Persian Period. Cambridge University Press. pp. 70–87. ISBN 978-0-521-21880-1.

==== Hellenistic period ====
- Atkinson, Kenneth (2018). The Hasmoneans and Their Neighbors. Jewish and Christian texts in contexts and related studies. London; New York: T&T Clark. ISBN 978-0-567-68082-2. Archived from the original on 19 December 2023.
- Bevan, Edwyn (2014). A History of Egypt under the Ptolemaic Dynasty. Taylor & Francis. pp. 44–. ISBN 978-1-317-68224-0. Archived from the original on 19 December 2023.
- Collins, John J. (2016). "Temple or Taxes? What Sparked the Maccabean Revolt?". Revolt and Resistance in the Ancient Classical World and the Near East: In the Crucible of Empire. Brill. pp. 189–201. ISBN 978-90-04-33018-4. Archived from the original on 19 December 2023.
- Dąbrowa, Edward (2010). The Hasmoneans and Their State: A Study in History, Ideology, and the Institutions. Jagiellonian University Press. ISBN 978-83-233-2837-7. Archived from the original on 19 December 2023.
- Gruen, Erich S. (2016). "When is a Revolt not a Revolt? A Case for Contingency". Revolt and Resistance in the Ancient Classical World and the Near East: In the Crucible of Empire. Brill. pp. 10–37. ISBN 978-90-04-33018-4. Archived from the original on 19 December 2023.
- Hengel, Martin (1984). "The political and social history of Palestine from Alexander to Antiochus III". In Davies, William David; Finkelstein, Louis (eds.). The Cambridge History of Judaism: Volume 2, The Hellenistic Age. Cambridge University Press. pp. 35–78. ISBN 978-0-521-21929-7. Archived from the original on 19 December 2023.
- Levin, Yigal (24 September 2020). "The Religion of Idumea and Its Relationship to Early Judaism". Religions. 11 (10): 487. doi:10.3390/rel11100487. ISSN 2077-1444.
- Lundahl, Mats (2002). "The Attraction of Extraction: Three Cases of State Versus Peasantry". Politics or Markets?: Essays on Haitian Underdevelopment. Routledge. pp. 200–221. ISBN 978-1-134-95099-7. Archived from the original on 19 December 2023.
- Myles, Jack (2010). "The Greatest Translation of All Time: The Cultural Importance of the Septuagint". In Dijkstra, Jitse; Kroesen, Justin; Kuiper, Yme (eds.). Myths, Martyrs, and Modernity: Studies in the History of Religions in Honour of Jan N. Bremmer. Brill. pp. 343–357. ISBN 978-90-04-19365-9. Archived from the original on 19 December 2023.

==== Roman period ====
- "Christianity – The history of Christianity". Encyclopædia Britannica. 2020. Archived from the original on 25 January 2021.
- "Jesus – The context of Jesus' career". Encyclopædia Britannica. Archived from the original on 11 November 2020.
- "Jesus – The Jewish religion in the 1st century". Encyclopædia Britannica. Archived from the original on 11 December 2020.
- "Palestine – Roman Palestine". Encyclopædia Britannica. Archived from the original on 30 October 2023.
- Perowne, Stewart Henry (1999). "Herod". Encyclopædia Britannica. Archived from the original on 25 June 2015.
- "The relation of the early church to the career and intentions of Jesus". Encyclopædia Britannica. 2020. Archived from the original on 18 January 2021.
- Allen, Joel S. (2013). Jewish Biblical Legends: Rabbinic Wisdom for Christian Readers. Wipf and Stock Publishers. ISBN 978-1-62189-890-0. Archived from the original on 19 December 2023.
- Bibliowicz, Abel M. (2019). Jewish-Christian Relations-The First Centuries. WA: Mascarat. ISBN 978-1-5136-1648-3. Archived from the original on 16 November 2021.
- Butcher, Kevin (2003). Roman Syria and the Near East. Getty Publications. ISBN 978-0-89236-715-3.
- Chancey, Mark A. (2004). "City Coins and Roman Power in Palestine: from Pompey to the Great Revolt". In Edwards, Douglas R. (ed.). Religion and Society in Roman Palestine: Old Questions, New Approaches. Taylor & Francis. ISBN 978-0-203-40956-5. Archived from the original on 19 December 2023.
- Chancey, Mark A. (2005). Greco-Roman Culture and the Galilee of Jesus. Cambridge University Press. ISBN 978-1-139-44798-0. Archived from the original on 19 December 2023.
- Dignas, Beate; Winter, Engelbert (2007) [First published 2001]. Rome and Persia in Late Antiquity: Neighbours and Rivals. Cambridge University Press. ISBN 978-0-521-84925-8. Archived from the original on 19 December 2023.
- Eshel, Hanan (2008). "The Bar Kochba Revolt, 132–135". In Katz, Steven T. (ed.). The Cambridge History of Judaism: Volume 4, The Late Roman-Rabbinic Period. Cambridge University Press. pp. 105–127. ISBN 978-0-521-77248-8. Archived from the original on 19 December 2023.
- Foster, Zachary (2017). The Invention of Palestine (thesis). Princeton University. p. 278. ISBN 978-0-355-48023-8. Docket 10634618. Archived from the original on 29 July 2021.
- Gabba, Emilio (2008). "The social, economic and political history of Palestine 63 BCE – CE 70". In Davies, William David; Finkelstein, Louis; Horbury, William (eds.). The Cambridge History of Judaism: The early Roman period. Cambridge University Press. pp. 94–167. ISBN 978-0-521-24377-3. Archived from the original on 3 July 2024.
- Goldenberg, Robert (2008). "The Destruction of the Jerusalem Temple: its Meaning and its Consequences". In Katz, Steven T. (ed.). The Cambridge History of Judaism: Volume 4, The Late Roman-Rabbinic Period. Cambridge University Press. pp. 191–205. ISBN 978-0-521-77248-8. Archived from the original on 19 December 2023.
- Haensch, Rudolf (2010). "The Roman Provincial Administration". In Hezser, Catherine (ed.). The Oxford Handbook of Jewish Daily Life in Roman Palestine. OUP Oxford. pp. 1–13. ISBN 978-0-19-921643-7. Archived from the original on 3 July 2024.
- Har-El, Menashe (1977). This Is Jerusalem. Canaan Publishing House. pp. 68–95. ISBN 0-86628-002-2.
- Jacobson, David (1999). "Palestine and Israel". Bulletin of the American Schools of Oriental Research. 313 (313): 65–74. doi:10.2307/1357617. JSTOR 1357617. S2CID 163303829.
- Jacobson, David (2001), "When Palestine Meant Israel", Biblical Archaeology Review, 27 (3), archived from the original on 25 July 2011
- Kimelman, Reuven (2008). "Rabbinic Prayer in Late Antiquity". In Katz, Steven T. (ed.). The Cambridge History of Judaism: Volume 4, The Late Roman-Rabbinic Period. Cambridge University Press. pp. 573–611. ISBN 978-0-521-77248-8. Archived from the original on 19 December 2023.
- Köstenberger, Andreas J.; Kellum, L. Scott; Quarles, Charles L (2016). The Cradle, the Cross, and the Crown: An Introduction to the New Testament. B&H Publishing Group. ISBN 978-1-4336-8401-2. Archived from the original on 19 December 2023.
- Lehmann, Clayton Miles (2007). "Palestine: History". The On-line Encyclopedia of the Roman Provinces. University of South Dakota. Archived from the original on 10 March 2008.
- Lendering, Jona (28 April 2020). "Fiscus Judaicus". Livius. Archived from the original on 27 November 2022.
- Lendering, Jona (10 October 2020). "Herod the Great". Livius. Archived from the original on 26 November 2020.
- Levine, Amy-Jill, ed. (2006). The Historical Jesus in Context. Princeton University Press. ISBN 1-4008-2737-X. Archived from the original on 19 December 2023.
- Lewin, Ariel (2005). The Archaeology of Ancient Judea and Palestine. Getty Publications. ISBN 978-0-89236-800-6. Archived from the original on 19 December 2023.
- Neusner, Jacob (2003). Understanding Rabbinic Judaism: From Talmudic to Modern Times. Wipf and Stock Publishers. ISBN 978-1-59244-213-3. Archived from the original on 19 December 2023.
- Safrai, Schmuel (1976). "The Jews in the Land of Israel (70–335)". In Ben-Sasson, H. H. (ed.). A History of the Jewish People. Harvard University Press. pp. 314–342. ISBN 978-0-674-39731-6. Archived from the original on 19 January 2023.
- Sartre, Maurice (2005). The Middle East Under Rome. Harvard University Press. ISBN 978-0-674-01683-5.
- Scheindlin, Raymond P. (2000). A Short History of the Jewish People: From Legendary Times to Modern Statehood. Oxford University Press. ISBN 978-0-19-513941-9. Archived from the original on 19 December 2023.
- Schwartz, Seth (2016). "The Impact of the Jewish Rebellions, 66–135 CE: Destruction or Provincialization?". Revolt and Resistance in the Ancient Classical World and the Near East: In the Crucible of Empire. Brill. pp. 234–252. ISBN 978-90-04-33018-4. Archived from the original on 19 December 2023.
- Seligman, Jon (2017). "'Absence of Evidence' or 'Evidence of Absence' Was Jerusalem the Legionary Camp and Where Was Civilian Aelia Capitolina?". In Avni, Gideon; Stiebel, Guy (eds.). Roman Jerusalem: A New Old City. Journal of Roman Archaeology. pp. 107–116. ISBN 978-0-9913730-9-3. Archived from the original on 19 December 2023.
- Taylor, Joan E. (2012). The Essenes, the Scrolls, and the Dead Sea. Oxford University Press. ISBN 978-0-19-955448-5. Archived from the original on 19 December 2023. "Up until this date the Bar Kokhba documents indicate that towns, villages and ports where Jews lived were busy with industry and activity. Afterwards there is an eerie silence, and the archaeological record testifies to little Jewish presence until the Byzantine era, in En Gedi. This picture coheres with what we have already determined in Part I of this study, that the crucial date for what can only be described as genocide, and the devastation of Jews and Judaism within central Judea, was 135 CE and not, as usually assumed, 70 CE, despite the siege of Jerusalem and the Temple's destruction"
- Young, Gary K. (2003) [2001]. Rome's Eastern Trade: International Commerce and Imperial Policy 31 BC – AD 305. Routledge. ISBN 978-1-134-54793-7.
- Zissu, Boaz (2018). "Interbellum Judea 70–132 CE: An Archaeological Perspective". In Schwartz, Joshua J; Tomson, Peter J. (eds.). Jews and Christians in the First and Second Centuries: The Interbellum 70‒132 CE. Leiden, The Netherlands: Brill. pp. 19–49. ISBN 978-90-04-34986-5. OCLC 988856967. Archived from the original on 11 May 2023.
- Zucker, David J. (2005). The Torah: An Introduction for Christians and Jews. Paulist Press. ISBN 978-0-8091-4349-8. Archived from the original on 3 July 2024.

=== Middle Ages ===
==== Byzantine period ====
- Balfour, Alan (2012). Solomon's Temple: Myth, Conflict, and Faith. John Wiley & Sons. pp. 112–. ISBN 978-0-470-67495-6.
- Browning, Robert (1976). The Emperor Julian. University of California Press. ISBN 978-0-520-03731-1. Archived from the original on 19 December 2023.
- "Constantine I – Commitment to Christianity". Encyclopædia Britannica. 2020. Archived from the original on 15 April 2017.
- Drijvers, Jan Willem (2002). "Heraclius and the Restitutio Crucis: Notes on Symbolism and Ideology". In Reinink, G. J.; Stolte, Bernard H. (eds.). The Reign of Heraclius (610–641): Crisis and Confrontation. Peeters Publishers. pp. 175–190. ISBN 978-90-429-1228-1. Archived from the original on 19 December 2023.
- Foss, Clive (July 2003). "The Persians in the Roman Near East (602–630 AD)". Journal of the Royal Asiatic Society of Great Britain & Ireland. 13 (2): 149–170. doi:10.1017/S1356186303003055. S2CID 162252154.
- Fredriksen, Paula; Irshai, Oded (2008). "Christian anti-Judaism: polemics and policies". In Katz, Steven T. (ed.). The Cambridge History of Judaism: Volume 4, The Late Roman-Rabbinic Period. Cambridge University Press. pp. 997–1034. ISBN 978-0-521-77248-8. Archived from the original on 19 December 2023.
- Gaddis, Michael (1999). There is No Crime for Those who Have Christ: Religious Violence in the Christian Roman Empire. Princeton University. ISBN 978-0-520-24104-6. Archived from the original on 19 December 2023.
- Goodblatt, David (2008). "The political and social history of the Jewish community in the Land of Israel, c. 235–638". In Katz, Steven T. (ed.). The Cambridge History of Judaism: Volume 4, The Late Roman-Rabbinic Period. Cambridge University Press. pp. 404–430. ISBN 978-0-521-77248-8. Archived from the original on 19 December 2023.
- Gzella, Holger (2015). A Cultural History of Aramaic: From the Beginnings to the Advent of Islam. Brill. ISBN 978-90-04-28510-1. Archived from the original on 19 December 2023.
- Hahn, Johannes; Menze, Volker (2020). The Wandering Holy Man: The Life of Barsauma, Christian Asceticism, and Religious Conflict in Late Antique Palestine. Univ of California Press. ISBN 978-0-520-30414-7. Archived from the original on 19 December 2023.
- Haldon, John (2002). "The Reign of Heraclius: a Context for Change?". In Reinink, G. J.; Stolte, Bernard H. (eds.). The Reign of Heraclius (610-641): Crisis and Confrontation. Peeters Publishers. pp. 1–16. ISBN 978-90-429-1228-1. Archived from the original on 19 December 2023.
- Harries, Jill (2012). Imperial Rome AD 284 to 363: The New Empire. Edinburgh University Press. ISBN 978-0-7486-2052-4. Archived from the original on 19 December 2023.
- Horn, Cornelia B.; Phenix, Robert R. Jr. (2008). The Lives of Peter the Iberian, Theodosius of Jerusalem, and the Monk Romanus. Society of Biblical Lit. ISBN 978-1-58983-200-8. Archived from the original on 19 December 2023.
- Hughes, Ian (2020). A Military Life of Constantine the Great. Pen and Sword Military. ISBN 978-1-5267-2426-7. Archived from the original on 3 July 2024.
- Janin, Hunt (2015). Four Paths to Jerusalem: Jewish, Christian, Muslim, and Secular Pilgrimages, 1000 BCE to 2001 CE. McFarland. ISBN 978-1-4766-0880-8. Archived from the original on 19 December 2023.
- Kazhdan, Aleksandr Petrovich (1991). The Oxford Dictionary of Byzantium. Oxford University Press. ISBN 978-0-19-504652-6. Archived from the original on 19 December 2023.
- Lawler, Jennifer (2011). Encyclopedia of the Byzantine Empire. McFarland. ISBN 978-0-7864-6616-0. Archived from the original on 19 December 2023.
- Lendering, Jona (12 October 2020). "Arabia Deserta". Livius. Archived from the original on 25 December 2020.
- Lewis, Bernard (2011). Islam in History: Ideas, People, and Events in the Middle East. Open Court. ISBN 978-0-8126-9757-5. Archived from the original on 19 December 2023.
- McGuckin, John (2008). "Monasticism and Monasteries". In Jeffreys, Elizabeth; Haldon, John F.; Cormack, Robin (eds.). The Oxford Handbook of Byzantine Studies. Oxford University Press. pp. 611–620. ISBN 978-0-19-925246-6.
- Marsham, Andrew (2013). "The Architecture of Allegiance in Early Islamic Late Antiquity: The Accession of Mu'awiya in Jerusalem, ca. 661 CE". In Beihammer, Alexander; Constantinou, Stavroula; Parani, Maria (eds.). Court Ceremonies and Rituals of Power in Byzantium and the Medieval Mediterranean. Leiden and Boston: Brill. pp. 87–114. ISBN 978-90-04-25686-6. Archived from the original on 31 January 2024.
- Middleton, John (2015). World Monarchies and Dynasties. Routledge. ISBN 978-1-317-45158-7.
- Mitchell, Stephen (2014). A History of the Later Roman Empire, AD 284–641. Wiley. ISBN 978-1-118-34106-3.
- Neusner, Jacob (2008). Judaism and Christianity in the Age of Constantine: History, Messiah, Israel, and the Initial Confrontation. University of Chicago Press. ISBN 978-0-226-57647-3.
- Pummer, Reinhard (2016). The Samaritans: A Profile. Wm. B. Eerdmans Publishing. pp. 132–. ISBN 978-0-8028-6768-1.
- Reinik, Gerrit J. (2002). "Heraclius, the New Alexander: Apocalyptic Prophecies during the Reign of Heraclius". In Reinink, G. J.; Stolte, Bernard H. (eds.). The Reign of Heraclius (610–641): Crisis and Confrontation. Peeters Publishers. pp. 81–94. ISBN 978-90-429-1228-1. Archived from the original on 19 December 2023.
- Shahid, Irfan (2002). Byzantium and the Arabs in the Sixth Century. Vol. II. Dumbarton Oaks. ISBN 978-0-88402-214-5.
- Sivan, Hagith (2008). Palestine in Late Antiquity. OUP Oxford. ISBN 978-0-19-160867-4.
- Taylor, Jane (2002). Petra and the Lost Kingdom of the Nabataeans. Harvard University Press. ISBN 978-0-674-00849-6. Archived from the original on 19 December 2023.
- "Vulgate". Encyclopædia Britannica. Archived from the original on 13 March 2022.

==== Early Muslim period ====
- "Ahl al-Kitāb – Islam". Encyclopædia Britannica. Archived from the original on 21 November 2020.
- "Dome of the Rock". Encyclopædia Britannica. Archived from the original on 15 June 2008.
- "Fāṭimid Dynasty – Islamic dynasty". Encyclopædia Britannica. Archived from the original on 1 September 2022.
- "Ṭūlūnid Dynasty". Encyclopædia Britannica. Archived from the original on 16 April 2008.
- Adler, Philip J.; Pouwels, Randall L. (2006). World Civilizations (4th ed.). Thomson Wadsworth. ISBN 0-534-59933-8.
- Al-Salim, Farid (2015). Palestine and the Decline of the Ottoman Empire: Modernization and the Path to Palestinian Statehood. Bloomsbury Publishing. ISBN 978-1-78673-967-4. Archived from the original on 19 December 2023.
- Bacharach, Jere L. (2010). "Signs of Sovereignty: The "Shahāda", the Qurʾanic Verses, and the Coinage of ʿAbd al-Malik". Muqarnas Online. 27. Brill: 1–30. doi:10.1163/22118993_02701002. ISSN 2211-8993. JSTOR 25769690.
- Bahat, Dan (1990). The Illustrated Atlas of Jerusalem. Carta. ISBN 978-965-220-348-9. Archived from the original on 19 December 2023.
- Bianquis, Thierry (1998). "Autonomous Egypt from Ibn Ṭūlūn to Kāfūr, 868–969". In Petry, Carl F. (ed.). The Cambridge History of Egypt, Volume 1: Islamic Egypt, 640–1517. Vol. 1. Cambridge University Press. pp. 86–119. doi:10.1017/CHOL9780521471374. ISBN 0-521-47137-0.
- Blankinship, Khalid Yahya (1994). The End of the Jihad State: The Reign of Hisham Ibn 'Abd al-Malik and the Collapse of the Umayyads. SUNY Press. ISBN 978-0-7914-1827-7. Archived from the original on 19 December 2023.
- Brett, Michael (2017). The Fatimid Empire. Edinburgh University Press. ISBN 978-1-4744-2151-5. Archived from the original on 19 December 2023.
- Burke, Aaron A; Peilstocker, Martin (2011). The History and Archaeology of Jaffa 1. Cotsen Institute of Archaeology Press. ISBN 978-1-938770-56-2. Archived from the original on 19 December 2023.
- Cobb, Paul M. (2001). White Banners: Contention in 'Abbasid Syria, 750–880. SUNY Press. ISBN 978-0-7914-4880-9. Archived from the original on 19 December 2023.
- Crone, Patricia (1994). "Were the Qays and Yemen of the Umayyad Period Political Parties?". Der Islam. 71 (1): 1–57. doi:10.1515/islm.1994.71.1.1. S2CID 154370527.
- Elad, Amikam (1999). Medieval Jerusalem and Islamic Worship: Holy Places, Ceremonies, Pilgrimage (2nd ed.). Leiden: Brill. ISBN 90-04-10010-5. Archived from the original on 6 January 2024.
- Faizer, Rizwi (1998). "The Shape of the Holy: Early Islamic Jerusalem". Rizwi's Bibliography for Medieval Islam. Archived from the original on 9 June 2007.
- Gil, Moshe (1997). A History of Palestine, 634–1099. Cambridge University Press. ISBN 978-0-521-59984-9.
- Goitein, S.D.; Grabar, O. (2007). "Jerusalem". In Bosworth, Clifford Edmund (ed.). Historic Cities of the Islamic World. Brill. pp. 224–255. ISBN 978-90-04-15388-2. Archived from the original on 29 June 2023.
- Hawting, Gerald R. (2000). The First Dynasty of Islam: The Umayyad Caliphate AD 661–750 (2nd ed.). London; New York: Routledge. ISBN 0-415-24072-7. Archived from the original on 19 December 2023.
- Hawting, Gerald R. (2002). The First Dynasty of Islam: The Umayyad Caliphate AD 661–750 (2nd ed.). Routledge. ISBN 978-1-134-55059-3.
- Jotischky, Andrew (2016). Kedar, Benjamin Z.; Phillips, Jonathan; Riley-Smith, Jonathan (eds.). Crusades. Vol. 7. Taylor & Francis. ISBN 978-1-351-98557-4. Archived from the original on 3 July 2024.
- Kennedy, Hugh N. (2004). The Prophet and the Age of the Caliphates: The Islamic Near East from the 6th to the 11th Century (2nd ed.). Harlow: Pearson Education Limited. ISBN 0-582-40525-4.
- Lev, Yaacov (2006). "Palestine". In Meri, Josef W. (ed.). Medieval Islamic Civilization: L–Z, index. Taylor & Francis. pp. 590–592. ISBN 978-0-415-96692-4. Archived from the original on 3 July 2024.
- Levy-Rubin, Milka; Kedar, Benjamin Z (2001). "A Spanish Source on mid-Ninth Century Mar Saba and a Neglected Sabaite Martyr". In Patrich, Joseph (ed.). The Sabaite Heritage in the Orthodox Church from the Fifth Century to the Present. Peeters Publishers. pp. 63–83. ISBN 978-90-429-0976-2. Archived from the original on 3 July 2024.
- Mourad, Suleiman Ali (2008). "The symbolism of Jerusalem in early Islam". In Mayer, Tamar; Mourad, Suleiman A. (eds.). Jerusalem: Idea and Reality. Routledge. ISBN 978-1-134-10287-7. Archived from the original on 3 July 2024.
- Peters, F. E. (1985). Jerusalem: The Holy City in the Eyes of Chroniclers, Visitors, Pilgrims, and Prophets from the Days of Abraham to the Beginnings of Modern Times. Princeton University Press. ISBN 978-1-4008-8616-6 – via Internet Archive.
- Rihan, Mohammad (2014). The Politics and Culture of an Umayyad Tribe: Conflict and Factionalism in the Early Islamic Period. London: I.B. Tauris and Company Limited. ISBN 978-1-78076-564-8. Archived from the original on 3 July 2024.
- Rivlin, Paul (2009). Arab Economies in the Twenty-First Century. Cambridge University Press. ISBN 978-0-521-89500-2. Archived from the original on 3 July 2024.
- Saunders, John Joseph (2002). A History of Medieval Islam. Routledge. pp. 109–. ISBN 978-1-134-93005-0. Archived from the original on 19 December 2023.
- Sharon, Moshe (June 1966). "An Arabic Inscription from the Time of the Caliph 'Abd al-Malik". Bulletin of the School of Oriental and African Studies. 29 (2): 367–372. doi:10.1017/S0041977X00058900.
- Sharon, Moshe (2004). Corpus Inscriptionum Arabicarum Palaestinae (CIAP): D-F. Volume Three. Leiden and Boston: Brill. ISBN 90-04-13197-3. Archived from the original on 3 July 2024.
- Cytryn-Silverman, Katia (2007). "The Fifth Mīl from Jerusalem: Another Umayyad Milestone from Southern Bilād al-Shām". Bulletin of the School of Oriental and African Studies. 70 (3). Cambridge University Press: 603–610. doi:10.1017/S0041977X07000857. JSTOR 40378940.
- Silverstein, Adam J. (2010). Islamic History: A Very Short Introduction. OUP Oxford. ISBN 978-0-19-160934-3. Archived from the original on 19 December 2023.
- Slavik, Diane (2001). Daily Life in Ancient and Modern Jerusalem. Lerner Publications. ISBN 978-0-8225-3218-7. Archived from the original on 19 December 2023.
- Taxel, Itamar (May 2013). "Rural Settlement Processes in Central Palestine, ca. 640–800 C.E.: The Ramla-Yavneh Region as a Case Study". Bulletin of the American Schools of Oriental Research. 369 (369). The American Schools of Oriental Research: 157–199. doi:10.5615/bullamerschoorie.369.0157. JSTOR 10.5615/bullamerschoorie.369.0157.
- Tejirian, Eleanor H.; Spector Simon, Reeva (2012). Conflict, Conquest, and Conversion: Two Thousand Years of Christian Missions in the Middle East. Columbia University Press. ISBN 978-0-231-51109-4. Archived from the original on 19 December 2023.
- Wilkinson, John (2002). Jerusalem Pilgrims before the Crusades. Aris & Phillips. ISBN 978-0-85668-746-4.

==== Crusader period ====
- Abulafia, David (1999). "Part V: The Mediterranean Frontiers – The thirteenth-century crusades in the Mediterranean". The New Cambridge Medieval History, Volume 5: c. 1198–c. 1300. Cambridge and New York: Cambridge University Press. pp. 569–589. doi:10.1017/CHOL9780521362894.027. ISBN 978-1-139-05573-4. Archived from the original on 19 December 2023.
- Asbridge, Thomas (2010). The Crusades: The Authoritative History of the War for the Holy Land. HarperCollins e-books. ISBN 978-0-06-198136-4. Archived from the original on 19 December 2023.
- Boas, Adrian J. (2001). Jerusalem in the Time of the Crusades: Society, Landscape and Art in the Holy City Under Frankish Rule. Routledge. ISBN 978-1-134-58272-3. Archived from the original on 19 December 2023.
- "Crusades". Encyclopædia Britannica. 2020. Archived from the original on 17 August 2020.
- Ekdahl, Sven (2005). "Part II: Approaches to the Evidence – Crusades and Colonization in the Baltic". In Nicholson, Helen J. (ed.). Palgrave Advances in the Crusades. London: Palgrave Macmillan. pp. 172–203. doi:10.1057/9780230524095_9. ISBN 978-0-230-52409-5. ISSN 2947-6658.
- Fuller, Thomas (1639). The Historie of the Holy Warre. Thomas Buck. p. 248. Archived from the original on 19 December 2023.
- Izzeddin, Nejla M. Abu (1993). The Druzes: A New Study of Their History, Faith, and Society. Brill. p. 192. ISBN 90-04-09705-8. Archived from the original on 19 December 2023.
- Khalidi, Walid (1984). Before Their Diaspora. Institute for Palestine Studies, Washington DC. pp. 28–29. ISBN 0-88728-144-3.
- The London Magazine, and Monthly Chronologer. Edward Ekshaw. 1741. p. 206 – via Internet Archive.
- Madden, Thomas F. (2014). The Concise History of the Crusades. Rowman & Littlefield Publishers. ISBN 978-1-4422-3116-0. Archived from the original on 19 December 2023.
- Milner, John (1688). A Collection of the Church-history of Palestine: From Birth of Christ. Dring. Archived from the original on 19 December 2023.
- Nicolle, David (2005). Crusader Castles in the Holy Land 1192–1302. Osprey. ISBN 978-1-84176-827-4. Archived from the original on 27 September 2007.
- Salmon, Thomas (1744). Modern History, Or, The Present State of All Nations: Describing Their Respective Situations, Persons, Habits, and Buildings, Manners, Laws and Customs ... Plants, Animals, and Minerals. Vol. 1. London: Printed for T. Longman. T. Osborne. J. Shuckburgh. C. Hitch. S. Austen. And J. Rivington. p. 461. Archived from the original on 18 February 2023.
- Shṿartsfuḳs, Shimʿon; Schwarzfuchs, Simon (1979). Napoleon, the Jews, and the Sanhedrin. Routledge & Kegan Paul. ISBN 978-0-7100-8955-7.

=== Renaissance and early modern history ===
- Gerber, Haim (1998). "'Palestine' and other Territorial Concepts in the 17th Century". International Journal of Middle East Studies. 30 (4): 563–572. doi:10.1017/s0020743800052569. S2CID 162982234.
- Gershoni, I. (1997). Rethinking Nationalism in the Arab Middle East. Columbia University Press. p. 174. ISBN 978-0-231-10695-5.
- Herold, J. Christopher (2009). Bonaparte in Egypt. Fireship Press. ISBN 978-1-934757-76-5. Archived from the original on 19 December 2023.
- Joudah, Ahmad Hasan (1987). Revolt in Palestine in the Eighteenth Century: The Era of Shaykh Zahir Al-ʻUmar. Kingston Press. ISBN 978-0-940670-11-2. Archived from the original on 19 December 2023.
- Kark, Ruth (1994). American Consuls in the Holy Land, 1832–1914. Wayne State University Press. p. 139. ISBN 0-8143-2523-8. Archived from the original on 19 December 2023.
- Labat, Jean Baptiste (1735). Mémoires du Chevalier d'Arvieux (in French). Charles Jean Baptiste Delespine. Archived from the original on 19 December 2023.
- Mishaqah, Mikha'il (1988). Thackston, William McIntosh (ed.). Murder, Mayhem, Pillage, and Plunder: The History of the Lebanon in the 18th and 19th Centuries by Mikhayil Mishaqa (1800–1873). Translated by W. M. Thackston, Jr. SUNY Press. ISBN 978-0-88706-712-9.
- Philipp, Thomas (2013). Acre: The Rise and Fall of a Palestinian City, 1730–1831. Columbia University Press. ISBN 978-0-231-50603-8. Archived from the original on 19 December 2023.
- Rosen-Ayalon, Myriam (1998). "Between Cairo and Damascus: Rural Life and Urban Economics in the Holy Land During the Ayyuid, Maluk and Ottoman Periods". In Levy, Thomas Evan (ed.). The Archaeology of Society in the Holy Land. Leicester University Press. ISBN 978-0-7185-0165-5.
- Schölch, Alexander (1986). "Was There a Feudal System in Ottoman Lebanon and Palestine?". In Kushner, David (ed.). Palestine in the Late Ottoman Period: Political, Social, and Economic Transformation. Jerusalem; Leiden: Yad Izhak Ben-Zvi Press / E.J. Brill. pp. 130–145. ISBN 90-04-07792-8.
- Ze'evi, Dror (1996). An Ottoman century: the district of Jerusalem in the 1600s. SUNY Press. ISBN 0-7914-2915-6.

=== Modern history ===
- Bedjaoui, Mohammed, ed. (1991). International law: achievements and prospects. Paris and Dordrecht/Boston/London: UNESCO and Martinus Nijhoff Publishers. p. 7. ISBN 92-3-102716-6.
- Bell, J. Bowyer (1996). Terror Out of Zion. Transaction Publishers. pp. 35–36. ISBN 1-56000-870-9.
- Bentwich, Norman (1923). "The Abrogation of the Turkish Capitulations". Journal of Comparative Legislation and International Law. Third Series. 5 (4): 182–188. JSTOR 752966. Archived from the original on 19 December 2023.
- Bickerton, Ian J. (2009). The Arab–Israeli Conflict: A History. Reaktion Books. p. 106. ISBN 978-1-86189-527-1.
- Biger, Gideon (1981). "Where was Palestine? Pre-World War I perception". Area. 13 (2): 153–160.
- Biger, Gideon (2004). The Boundaries of Modern Palestine, 1840–1947. Routledge. pp. 13–15. ISBN 0-7146-5654-2.
- Black, Ian; Morris, Benny (1991). Israel's Secret Wars: A History of Israel's Intelligence Services. Grove Weidenfeld. pp. 3–. ISBN 978-0-8021-3286-4. Archived from the original on 19 December 2023.
- Bovis, H. Eugene (1971). The Jerusalem Question, 1917–1968. Hoover Press. p. 40. ISBN 978-0-8179-3293-0.
- Carroll, K. B. (2003). Business As Usual?: Economic Reform in Jordan. Lexington Books. p. 108. ISBN 978-0-7391-0505-4.
- Cattan, Henry (1988). The Palestine Question. Croom Helm. p. 36. ISBN 978-0-7099-4878-0. Archived from the original on 31 July 2023.
- Charrett, Catherine (2019). The EU, Hamas and the 2006 Palestinian Elections: A Performance in Politics. Taylor & Francis. pp. 237–. ISBN 978-1-351-61179-4. Archived from the original on 19 December 2023.
- Gelber, Yoav (2006). Palestine, 1948: War, Escape and the Emergence of the Palestinian Refugee Problem. Sussex Academic Press. p. 364. ISBN 978-1-84519-075-0. Archived from the original on 19 December 2023.
- Gelvin, James L. (2007). The Israel-Palestine conflict. Cambridge University Press. p. 120. ISBN 978-0-521-88835-6.
- Gil-Har, Yitzhak (January 2000). "Boundaries Delimitation: Palestine and Trans-Jordan". Middle Eastern Studies. 36 (1): 68–81. doi:10.1080/00263200008701297. S2CID 143735975.
- "Israel and the Palestinians: Key terms". BBC. 12 October 2006. Archived from the original on 22 October 2009.
- James, Lawrence (1997). The Rise and fall of the British Empire. Macmillan. p. 562. ISBN 0-312-16985-X.
- "Jericho Declaration". The Palestine Post. Associated Press, Reuters and UP. 14 December 1948. Front page.
- Kabahā, Muṣṭafá (2014). The Palestinian People: Seeking Sovereignty and State. Lynne Rienner Publishers, Incorporated. ISBN 978-1-58826-882-2. Archived from the original on 19 December 2023.
- Khalidi, Rashid (2006). The Iron Cage: The Story of the Palestinian Struggle for Statehood. Beacon Press. ISBN 978-0-8070-0309-1. Archived from the original on 19 January 2023.
- Khalidi, Rashid I. (1 November 2017). "Historical Landmarks in the Hundred Years' War on Palestine". Journal of Palestine Studies. 47 (1): 6–17. doi:10.1525/jps.2017.47.1.6.
- Kumaraswamy, P R (2015). Historical Dictionary of the Arab-Israeli Conflict. Rowman & Littlefield Publishers. p. 368. ISBN 978-1-4422-5170-0. Archived from the original on 19 December 2023.
- Laurens, Henry (2000). La Question de Palestine: Une mission sacrée de civilisation (1922–1947) (in French). Vol. 2. Paris: Fayard. p. 101. ISBN 978-2-213-61251-5.
- Lenk, R.S.; Lenk, Karl (1991). The Mauritius Affair, The Boat People of 1940/41. London: R.S. Lenk. ISBN 978-0-9518805-2-4.
- Levy, Avigdor, ed. (2003). Jews, Turks, Ottomans. Syracuse University Press. ISBN 0-8156-2941-9.
- Lustick, Ian (20 November 2009). "Has Israel Annexed East Jerusalem?". Middle East Policy Council. Archived from the original on 20 November 2009.
- Lutfiyya, A. M.; Baytin (1966). A Jordanian Village. A Study of Social Institutions and Social Change in a Folk Community. Walter de Gruyter. pp. 13–14.
- "Mandate for Palestine". Encyclopaedia Judaica. Vol. 11. Jerusalem: Keter Publishing House. 1972. p. 862.
- Mandel, Neville (1976). The Arabs and Zionism before World War I. Berkeley: University of California Press. p. xviii.
- McGregor, Andrew James (2006). A Military History of Modern Egypt: From the Ottoman Conquest to the Ramadan War. Greenwood Publishing Group. ISBN 978-0-275-98601-8.
- Meṣer, Yaʿaqov; Metzer, Jacob (1998). The Divided Economy of Mandatory Palestine. Cambridge University Press. pp. 15–. ISBN 978-0-521-46550-2. Archived from the original on 19 December 2023.
- Morgenthau, Henry (2009). Ambassador Morgenthau's Story: Chapter X. Cornell University Library. p. 70. ISBN 978-1-112-30638-9. Archived from the original on 24 September 2012.
- Morris, Benny (2008). 1948: A History of the First Arab-Israeli War. Yale University Press. p. 396. ISBN 978-0-300-12696-9. "The immediate trigger of the 1948 War was the November 1947 UN partition resolution. The Zionist movement, except for its fringes, accepted the proposal."
- Palva, Heikki (2004). "Negations in the dialect of es-Salt, Jordan". In Haak, Martine; de Jong, Rudolf; Versteegh, Kees (eds.). Approaches to Arabic dialects: A collection of articles presented to Manfred Woidich on the occasion of his sixtieth birthday. Koninklijke Brill NV. ISBN 978-90-04-13206-1.
- Plascov, Abraham Ozer; Plascov, Avi (1981). The Palestinian Refugees in Jordan 1948–1957. Psychology Press. p. 2. ISBN 978-0-7146-3120-2.
- Porath, Yehoshua (1974). The Emergence of the Palestinian-Arab National Movement, 1918–1929. Cass. ISBN 0-7146-2939-1.
- Porath, Zipporah (2015) [1987]. Letters from Jerusalem, 1947–1948. Jerusalem: Association of Americans and Canadians in Israel. p. 26. ISBN 978-965-91987-2-6.
- Saleh, Dr Mohsen M. (2014). The Palestinian Issue: Historical Background & Contemporary Developments. al-Zaytouna Center for Studies and Consultations. p. 135. ISBN 978-9953-572-25-3. Archived from the original on 19 December 2023.
- Segev, Tom (2013). One Palestine, Complete: Jews and Arabs Under the British Mandate. Henry Holt and Company. ISBN 978-1-4668-4350-9. Archived from the original on 19 December 2023.
- Shehadeh, Raja (1997). From Occupation to Interim Accords: Israel and the Palestinian Territories. Kluwer Law International. p. 75. ISBN 978-90-411-0618-6.
- Shlaim, Avi (2007). "The debate about 1948". In Pappé, Ilan (ed.). The Israel/Palestine Question (2nd ed.). Routledge. pp. 139–160. ISBN 978-0-415-41096-0. Archived from the original on 2 September 2022.
- Sicker, Martin (1999), Reshaping Palestine: From Muhammad Ali to the British Mandate, 1831–1922, Greenwood Publishing Group, ISBN 978-0-275-96639-3
- Snetsinger, John (1974). Truman, The Jewish Vote, and the Creation of Israel. Hoover Press. p. 107. ISBN 978-0-8179-3393-7. Archived from the original on 19 December 2023.
- Strawson, John (2010). Partitioning Palestine: Legal Fundamentalism in the Palestinian-Israeli Conflict. Pluto Press. ISBN 978-0-7453-2324-4.
- Tessler, Mark A. (1994). A History of the Israeli-Palestinian conflict. Indiana University Press. pp. 155–156. ISBN 0-253-20873-4.
- Thayer, Lucius Ellsworth (April 1923). "The Capitulations of the Ottoman Empire and the Question of their Abrogation as it Affects the United States". The American Journal of International Law. 17 (2): 207–233. doi:10.2307/2188106. JSTOR 2188106. S2CID 147139601.
- Thomas, Baylis (1999). How Israel was Won: A Concise History of the Arab-Israeli Conflict. Lexington Books. p. 9. ISBN 978-0-7391-0064-6 – via Internet Archive.
- Tsimhoni, Daphne (1993). Christian communities in Jerusalem and the West Bank since 1948. Praeger. p. xv. ISBN 0-275-93921-9.
- Tucker, Spencer C.; Roberts, Priscilla (2008). The Encyclopedia of the Arab-Israeli Conflict: A Political, Social, and Military History [4 volumes]: A Political, Social, and Military History. ABC-CLIO. p. 464. ISBN 978-1-85109-842-2.
- Whiteman, Marjorie M. (1963). Digest of International Law. Vol. 1. Washington, DC: U.S. Government Printing Office. pp. 650–652.
- Yazbak, M. (1998). Haifa in the Late Ottoman Period, A Muslim Town in Transition, 1864–1914. Brill. ISBN 90-04-11051-8. Archived from the original on 17 April 2023.
