= John Bonham (mercer) =

British soldier and mercer

Sir John Bonham (fl. 13th/14th century) was a mercer of the City of London, revered as one of the Nine Worthies of London by Richard Johnson in his 1592 biography of eminent citizens.

According to Johnson's account, Bonham was an apprentice mercer of London, of Devonshire parents. He was entrusted with a valuable cargo bound for Denmark and found favour at the Danish court (then ruled by the House of Oldenburg). While there he was made commander of an army raised to stop the progress of "the great Solyman" during the reign of Edward I of England. He made peace with the Turkish leader, who knighted him and gave him chains of gold. It is not clear which war he took part in, or even if Bonham was a real historical person. He has been linked with a Sir John Bonham of Wishford (fl 1336–37).
