= Christopher Croker =

English businessman (fl. 1360s/70s)

Sir Christopher Croker (fl. 1360s/70s) was a vintner of the City of London, revered as one of the Nine Worthies of London by Richard Johnson in his 1592 biography of eminent citizens.

According to Johnson's account, Croker was apprenticed to a vintner of Gracechurch Street. He later became a soldier, and was a companion and friend of Edward the Black Prince who assisted Pedro of Castile in maintaining his claim to the throne of Castile in the War of the Two Peters (England was involved in the years 1362–1375).
