= Hugh Calverley (hunter) =

Silk weaver

- Occupation: Silk weaver

Sir Hugh Calverley (fl. 14th century) was a silk weaver of the City of London, revered as one of the Nine Worthies of London by Richard Johnson in his 1592 biography of eminent citizens.

According to Johnson's account, Calverley lived during the reign of Edward III (r. 1327–1377) and was a renowned hunter and famed for killing a huge wild boar (or bear) while in the service of the King of Poland.
