= Jacob's Well =

Well in Nablus, West Bank, Palestine

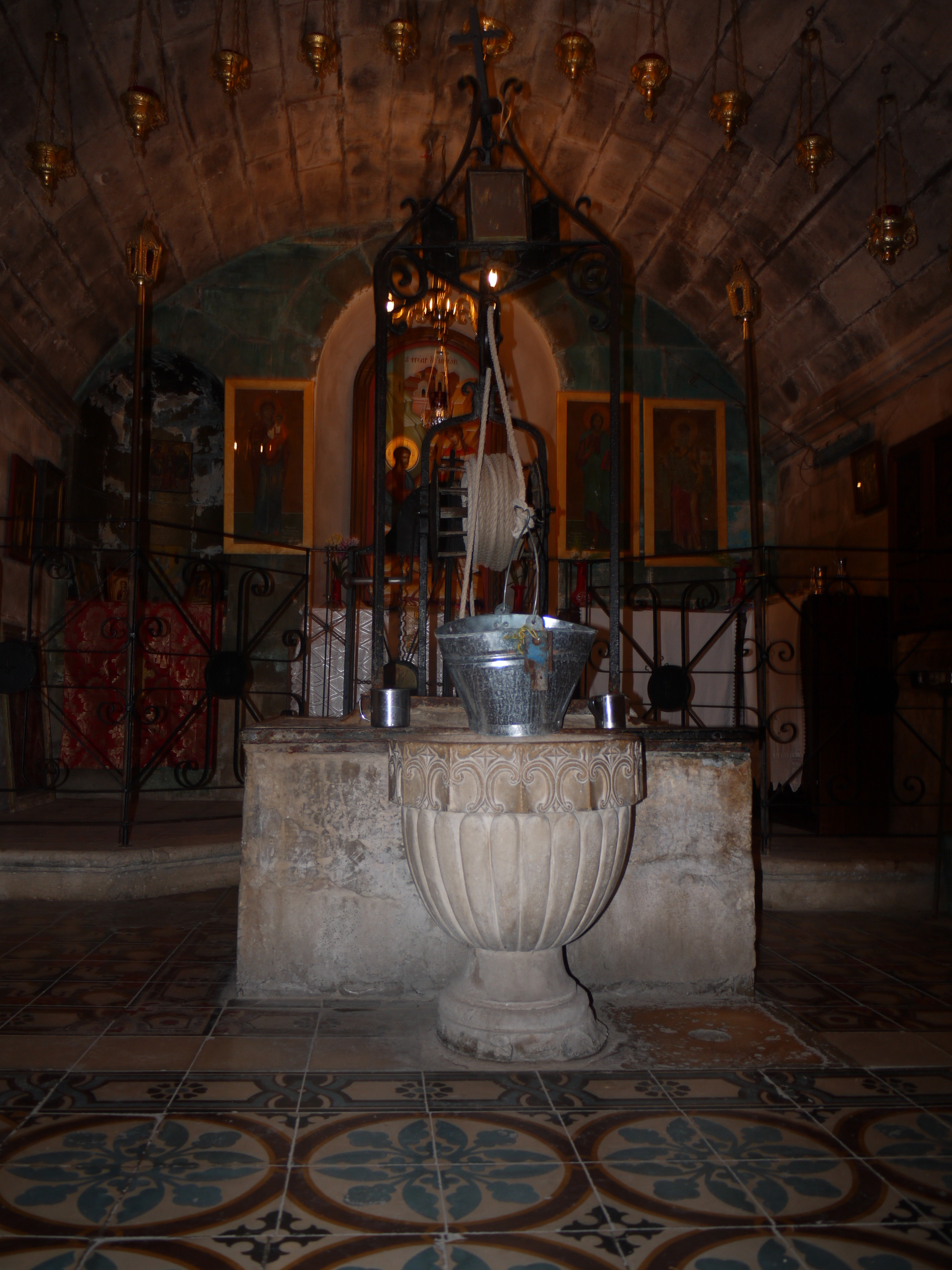
- Jacob's Well in 2013.

- Location within the West Bank
- 32.209461°N 35.285331°E
- Type: Well
- Location: Near Balata village, West Bank, Palestine

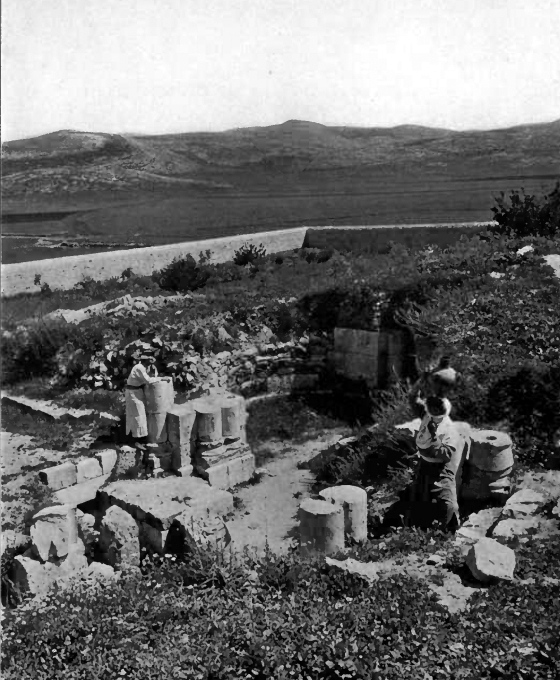
Jacob's Well, 1912

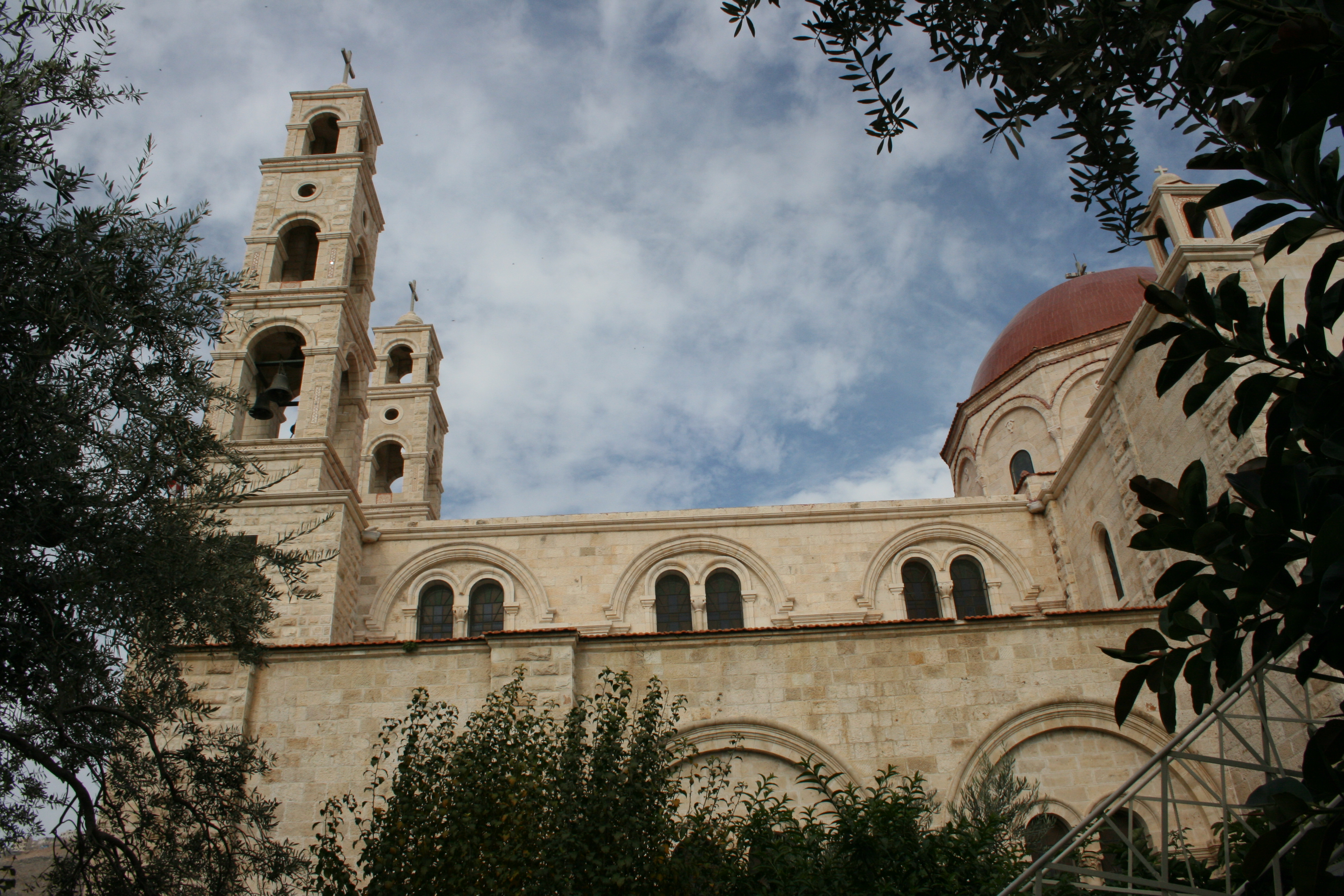
The Greek Orthodox St. Photini Church at Bir Ya'qub in 2008

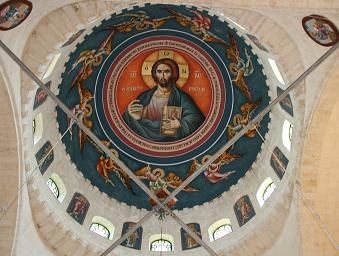
The dome of St. Photini Church at Bir Ya'qub (2008)

Jacob's Well, (Note: Arabic: بِئْر يَعْقُوب, romanized: Biʾr Yaʿqūb; Greek: Φρέαρ του Ιακώβ, romanized: Fréar tou Iakóv; Hebrew: באר יעקב, romanized: Beʾer Yaʿakov) also known as Jacob's Fountain or the Well of Sychar, is a Christian holy site located in Balata village, a suburb of the Palestinian city of Nablus in the West Bank. The well, currently situated inside an Eastern Orthodox church and monastery, has been associated in religious tradition with the biblical patriarch Jacob for roughly two millennia.

== Religious significance ==
Jacob's Well is named in the New Testament Gospel of John as the location of Jesus's encounter with the Samaritan woman:

So [Jesus] came to a town in Samaria called Sychar, near the plot of ground Jacob had given to his son Joseph. Jacob's well was there, and Jesus, tired as he was from the journey, sat down by the well.

The location of Sychar is uncertain; it may have been a town on the eastern slopes of Mount Ebal, or it may be another name for Shechem. Jacob is an Old Testament patriarch whose story is told in the Hebrew Book of Genesis. There is no specific mention in the Torah (which are the first 5 books of the Old Testament) of a well owned by Jacob, but the plot of ground described as the location of the well is considered by biblical scholars to be identical with the plot purchased by Jacob in Genesis 33, which was said to be "within sight" of Shechem.

The present-day church at Balata village is close to the archaeological site of Tell Balata, traditionally identified with Shechem. The well within this church has long been associated with the New Testament narrative, and Christian tradition therefore holds this well to have been dug by Jacob. The same belief is found among the Samaritans. Scholars such as James Hastings and Geoffrey W. Bromiley assert that Jewish tradition likewise connects the well with Jacob, but David Gurevich and Yisca Harani claim that "Judaism does not attribute any religious significance to the site".

== History ==
The writings of pilgrims indicate that Jacob's Well has been situated within different churches built at the same site over time. By the 330s AD, the site had been identified as the place where Jesus held his conversation with the Samaritan woman, and was probably being used for Christian baptisms. By 384 AD, a cruciform church was built over the site, and is mentioned in the 4th century writings of Saint Jerome. This church was most likely destroyed during the Samaritan revolts of 484 or 529 AD. Subsequently, rebuilt by Justinian I, this second Byzantine era church was still standing in the 720s AD, and possibly into the early 9th century AD.

The Byzantine church was definitely in ruins by the time the Crusaders occupied Nablus in August 1099 AD; early 12th-century accounts by pilgrims to the site speak of the well without mentioning a church. These include the appointment of Henry Maleverer as guardian of the well under the king of Jerusalem. There are later 12th-century accounts of a newly built church at Jacob's Well. The first such definitive account comes from Theoderic, who writes: "The well ... is a half a mile distant from the city Nablus: it lies in front of the altar in the church built over it, in which nuns devote themselves to the service of God. This well is called the Fountain of Jacob." This Crusader era church was constructed in 1175, likely due to the support of Queen Melisande, who retired to Nablus in 1152 where she lived until her death in 1161. This church appears to have been destroyed following Saladin's victory over the Crusaders in the Battle of Hittin in 1187.

In March 1697, when Henry Maundrell visited Jacob's Well, the water stood at 5 feet (1.5 m) deep of the well's total depth of 35 feet (11 m). Edward Robinson visited the site in the mid-19th century, describing the "remains of the ancient church," lying just above the well to the southwest as a "shapeless mass of ruins, among which are seen fragments of gray, granite columns, still retaining their ancient polish." Local Christians continued to venerate the site even when it was without a church. In 1860, the site was obtained by the Greek Orthodox Patriarchate and a new church, consecrated to St. Photini the Samaritan, was built in 1893 along with a small monastery. The 1927 Jericho earthquake destroyed that building.

In November 1979, at a time of increased tensions on the West Bank, the custodian of the well, Archimandrite Philoumenos, was found hatcheted to death inside the crypt housing the well. The assailant, a mentally ill resident of Tel Aviv, was apprehended three years later and confessed to that slaying and others, including an assault on a nun at the monastery and the axe murder of a Jewish psychiatrist in Tel Aviv. In 2009, the Greek Orthodox Patriarchate of Jerusalem declared Philoumenos a saint thirty years after his death.

Abuna (meaning "Father") Ioustinos, a Greek Orthodox priest from Nablus, later spearheaded a huge reconstruction project. Jacob's Well has since been restored and a new church modelled along the designs of the Crusader-era church houses the well inside it, in a crypt on a lower level.

== Physical description and location ==
Jacob's Well is located 76 meters (249 ft) from Tell Balata in the eastern part of the city of Nablus within the grounds of the Bir Ya'qub monastery. The well is accessed by entering the church on the monastery grounds, and descending the stairs to a crypt where the well still stands, along with "a small winch, a bucket, ex-voto icons and lots of lit candles."

According to Major Anderson, who visited the site in 1866, the well has:

"...a narrow opening, just wide enough to allow the body of a man to pass through with arms uplifted, and this narrow neck, which is about 4 ft. long, opens into the well itself, which is cylindrically shaped, and opens about 7 ft. 6 in. in diameter. The well and upper part of the well are built of masonry, and the well appears to have been sunk through a mixture of alluvial soil and limestone fragments, till a compact bed of mountain limestone was reached, having horizontal strata which could be easily worked; and the interior of the well presents the appearance of having been lined throughout with rough masonry."

Based on a measurement made in 1935, the total depth of the well is 41 meters (135 ft).

== Notes and references ==
Notes

Bibliography

- Becchio, Bruno; Schadé, Johannes P. (2006). "Jacob's fountain". Encyclopedia of World Religions. Foreign Media Group. ISBN 9781601360007.
- Brewer, E. C. (2001). The Wordsworth Dictionary of Phrase and Fable. Wordsworth. ISBN 1-84022-310-3.
- Bromiley, G. W. (1982). International Standard Bible Encyclopedia: E-J. Wm. B. Eerdmans. ISBN 9780802837820.
- Douglas, J. D.; Tenney, M. C.; Silva, M. (2011). Zondervan Illustrated Bible Dictionary. Zondervan. ISBN 978-0-310-22983-4.
- Gurevich, David; Harani, Yisca (2017). "Philoumenos of Jacob's Well: The Birth of a Contemporary Ritual Murder Narrative". Israel Studies. 22 (2). Indiana University Press: 26–54. doi:10.2979/israelstudies.22.2.02. JSTOR 10.2979/israelstudies.22.2.02. S2CID 152231830.
- Hastings, J.; Driver, S. R. (2004). A Dictionary of the Bible: Volume II: (Part II: I – Kinsman). The Minerva Group, Inc. ISBN 9781410217257.
- Maundrell, Henry (1836) [1703]. Greenwood, F. W. P. (ed.). A Journey from Aleppo to Jerusalem, at Easter, A.D. 1697. Christian Monitor (New Series, Vol. VI). Boston: Samuel G. Simpkins.
- Pringle, D. (1993). Churches of the Crusader Kingdom of Jerusalem: A Corpus. Vol. 1. Cambridge University Press. ISBN 9780521390361.
- Pringle, D. (2009). The Churches of the Crusader Kingdom of Jerusalem: The cities of Acre and Tyre with Addenda and Corrigenda to Volumes I-III. Vol. IV. Cambridge University Press. pp. 267 -269. ISBN 978-0-521-85148-0.
- Rast, Walter E. (1992). Through the Ages in Palestinian Archaeology: An Introductory Handbook. Trinity Press International. ISBN 1-56338-055-2.
- Robinson, E.; Smith, E. (1856). Later Biblical Researches in Palestine and adjacent regions: A Journal of Travels in the year 1852. London: John Murray.
