= William Sevenoke =

Member of the Parliament of England

Sir William Sevenoke

Lord Mayor of London
- In office 1418–1419
- Preceded by: Richard Merlawe
- Succeeded by: Richard Whittington

Personal details
- Born: c. 1373 England
- Died: c. 4 July 1432 (aged 58 or 59) Sevenoaks, Kent, England

Sir William Sevenoke (c. 1373 – c. 4 July 1432) was a grocer and politician who served as Mayor of London in 1418, and as warden of London Bridge, alderman of Bishopsgate Ward, alderman of Tower Ward, Warden of the Grocers' Company, Sheriff of London, Member of Parliament for the City of London and Surveyor of the King's works at Isleworth.

== Life ==
Sevenoke is said to have been an orphan, found in Sevenoaks, Kent and adopted by William Rumschedde. Apprenticed to Henry Bois as an ironmonger, in 1397 he successfully petitioned to be readmitted as a grocer, since Bois had actually belonged to the Grocers' Mystery.

He rose to prominence, being appointed Warden of London Bridge for 1404–06 and serving as Auditor of London in 1399, 1409–11 and 1414. He became an alderman in 1412 and Mayor of London for 1418–19. He was selected, as one of the two aldermanic representatives, the M.P. for the City of London in 1417.

Upon his death and resulting from a will dated 4 July 1432 he donated funds for the foundation of almshouses and a school in the town of Sevenoaks. These are still in existence and are now known as Sevenoaks School and Sevenoaks Almshouses. William Lambarde gave an account of the life of Sevenoke and the foundation of the school and almshouses in A Perambulation of Kent (1576), suggesting that his decision to establish the institutions may have been inspired by his early history. John Stow refers to William Sevenoke's civic roles and the founding of the school and almshouses in his Survey of London (1603), as does Anthony Munday in A Brief Chronicle (1611). A fictional account of the life of Sevenoke, as a famous Londoner who rose from rags to riches, is given by Richard Johnson in Nine Worthies of London (1592).

== See also ==
- List of Sheriffs of the City of London
- List of Lord Mayors of London
- City of London (elections to the Parliament of England)
