= Nine Worthies of London =

1592 book by Richard Johnson

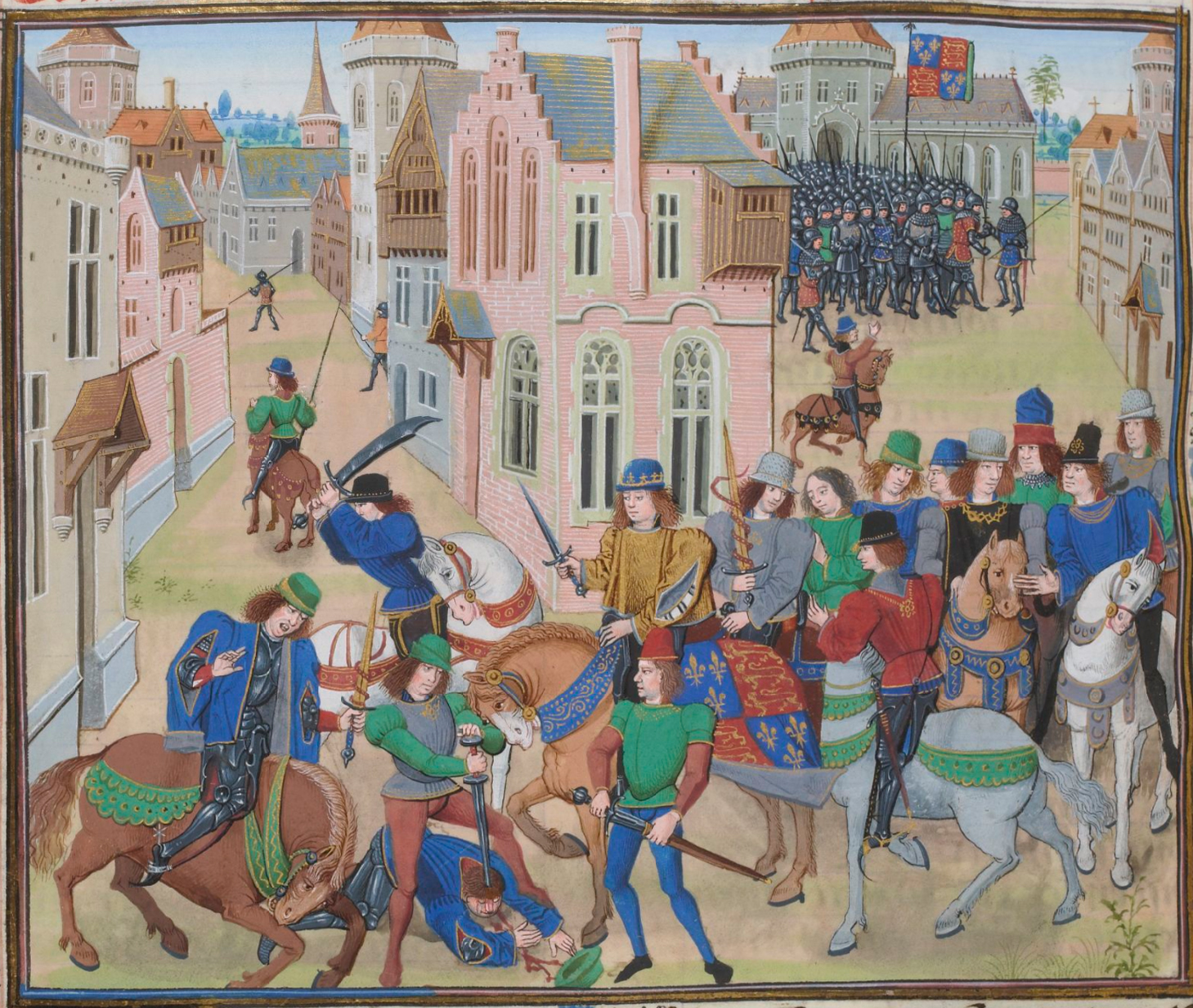
William Walworth (bottom left), one of the "Nine Worthies of London", kills Wat Tyler, at London Bridge, 1381.

Nine Worthies of London is a book by Richard Johnson, the English romance writer, written in 1592. Borrowing the theme from the Nine Worthies of Antiquity, the book, subtitled Explaining the Honourable Excise of Armes, the Vertues of the Valiant, and the Memorable Attempts of Magnanimous Minds; Pleasaunt for Gentlemen, not unseemly for Magistrates, and most profitable for Prentises, celebrated the rise of nine famous Londoners through society from the ranks of apprentices or ordinary citizens.

== List of Worthies ==
The nine were:

- Sir William Walworth, who killed Wat Tyler, the leader of the Peasants' Revolt of 1381. Sir William was originally a fishmonger, and later twice became Lord Mayor of London (in 1374 and 1380).
- Sir Henry Pritchard, a vintner, who in 1356 provided a feast for Edward III and 5,000 men returning from France, including Edward the Black Prince; Hugh IV of Cyprus; and David II of Scotland.
- Sir William Sevenoke, who fought against the Dauphin in France and, later, having made money as a grocer, became a philanthropist and built twenty almshouses and a school. He was Lord Mayor of London in 1418 and in 1420 became a Member of Parliament.
- Sir Thomas White, who, in 1554, helped keep the citizens loyal to Mary Tudor during Wyatt's rebellion. A merchant tailor and son of a poor clothier, he founded St John's College, Oxford. He became both Sheriff and later Lord Mayor of London.

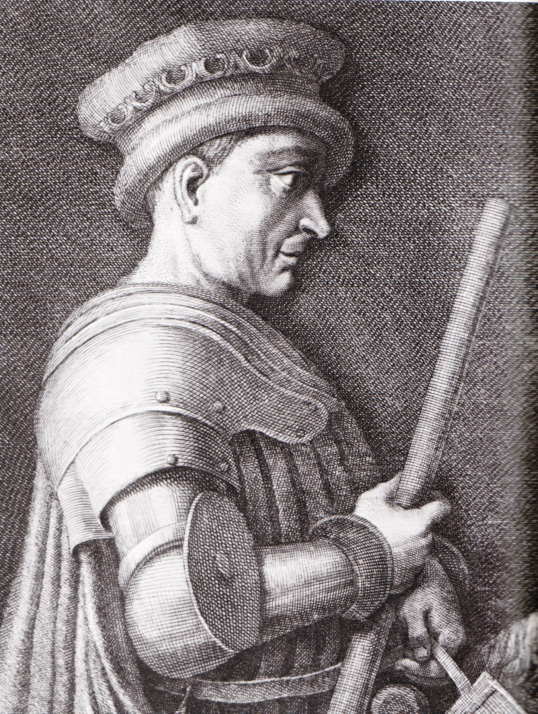
John Hawkwood.

- Sir John Bonham, a mercer, who was entrusted with a valuable cargo bound for Denmark and found favour at the Danish court. While there he was made commander of the army raised to stop the progress of the "great Solyman". He made peace with the Turkish leader and returned to England a rich man.
- Christopher Croker, originally a vintner, who with the Black Prince assisted Pedro of Castile in maintaining his claim to the throne of Castile.
- Sir John Hawkwood, who served under Edward III in France and later became a mercenary commander in Italy, where he was known as Giovanni Acuto. He was the son of an Essex tanner or a London tailor.
- Sir Hugh Calverley, a silk weaver, who was a renowned hunter and famed for killing a huge boar (or bear) for the Poles.
- Sir Henry Maleverer, generally called Henry of Cornhill, a grocer who lived in the reign of Henry IV. He was a knight in the Crusades, and highly regarded by the King of Jerusalem. He eventually fell out of favour and became the guardian of Jacob's Well in the Holy Land.

The term "Nine Worthies" was later used to refer to nine of the privy councillors of William III: the Whigs Devonshire, Dorset, Monmouth, and Edward Russell; and the Tories Caermarthen, Pembroke, Nottingham, Marlborough, and Lowther.
