= Henry Maleverer =

English businesspeople

Henry Maleverer, generally called Henry of Cornhill, was a grocer in the times of Henry IV, Holy Roman Emperor. He was a crusader, and was appointed by the King of Jerusalem as the guardian of "Jacob's well."

His life was documented as a famous Londoner in Nine Worthies of London by Richard Johnson in 1592.

It is said that he went to the Holy Land as a volunteer.
