= Thomas White (merchant) =

English merchant (1492–1567)

Sir Thomas White
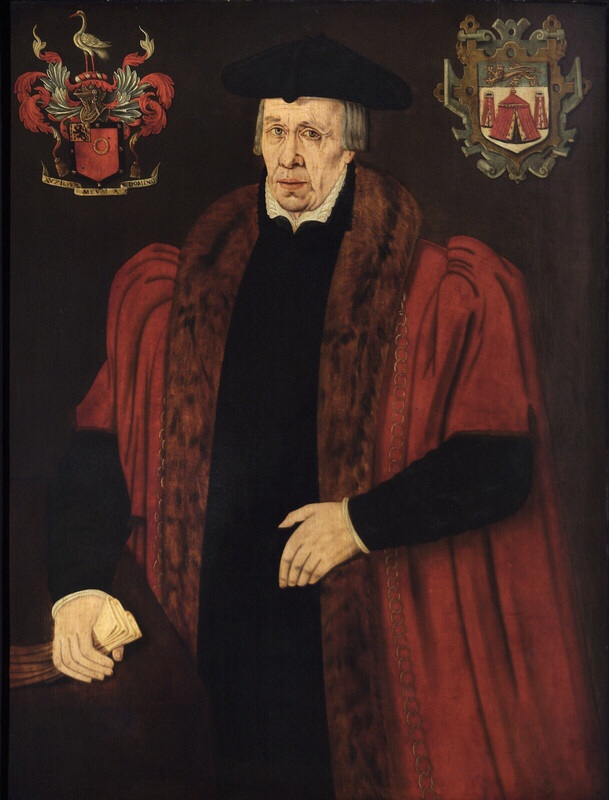
- Portrait of Sir Thomas White by "Sampson the paynter" (1597). In the collection of the City of Oxford.

Lord Mayor of London
- In office 1553–1554
- Preceded by: George Barne
- Succeeded by: John Lyon

Sheriff of London
- In office 1547–1548

Personal details
- Born: 7 June 1492 Reading, Berkshire, England
- Died: 12 February 1567 (aged 74)
- Parents: William White (father); Mary Kibblewhite (mother)

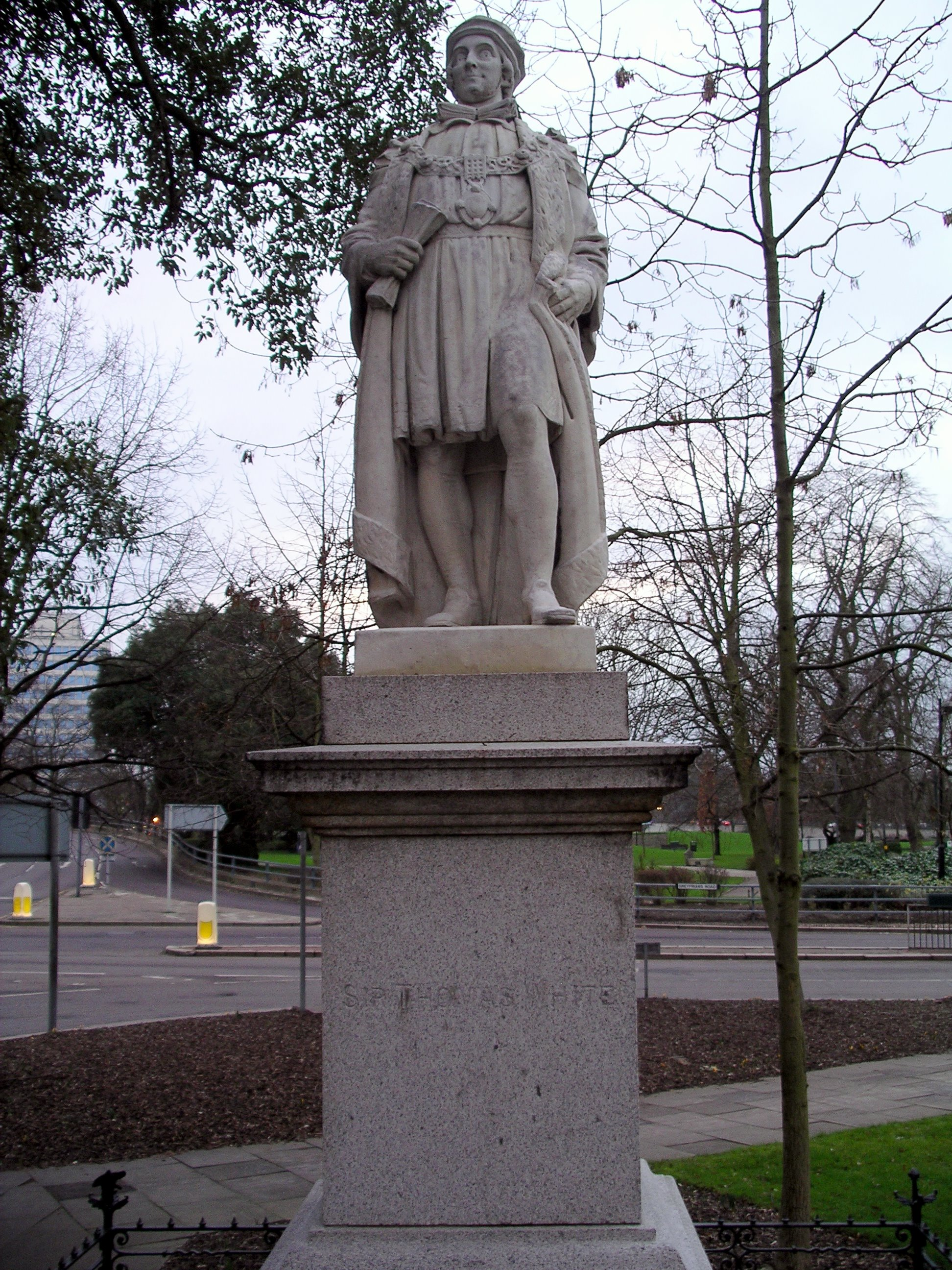
Statue of Sir Thomas White in Coventry, West Midlands

Sir Thomas White (7 June 1492 – 12 February 1567) was an English cloth merchant, founder of the Muscovy Company, Lord Mayor of London in 1553, and a civic benefactor and founder of St John's College, Oxford and Merchant Taylors' School.

== Biography ==
Thomas White was born 7 June 1492 in Reading, Berkshire, the son of William White, a clothier of Reading, and his wife, Mary, daughter of John Kibblewhite of South Fawley, also in Berkshire. He was brought up in London. Sir Thomas was twice married, to Avicia (died 1558) and to Joan. A principal member of the guild of Merchant Taylors, he served as Sheriff of London in 1547, and was elected Lord Mayor of London in 1553. He was knighted in the same year by Queen Mary I. He was a member of the commission for the trial of Lady Jane Grey.

In 1555, inspired by the example of Thomas Pope, founder of Trinity College, Oxford, White obtained a royal licence for the foundation of St John's College, Oxford, dedicated to the patron saint of the Merchant Taylors and established in the buildings of the dissolved Cistercian College of St Bernard. He was involved in the foundation of Merchant Taylors' School, and made provision that scholars of the college should be nominated from pupils of the school. He also established scholarships at St John's College, tenable by pupils of Tonbridge School, Bristol Grammar School, Reading School and King Henry VIII School, Coventry, where one of the school's four houses bears his name. He purchased Gloucester Hall and set it up in 1560 as a hall of residence for scholars; this became the basis of the later foundation of Worcester College. As a result of his philanthropy, he was listed in Richard Johnson's Nine Worthies of London in 1592.

== Sir Thomas White Loan Charity ==
The charity was founded in 1542 and is still extant. It gives interest-free loans to aspiring businesspeople in Leicestershire and Rutland. There are several memorials to White in England and he is honoured on Leicester's Clock Tower.

== Bibliography ==
- Mark Noble (1784). Memoirs of the Protectorate-house of Cromwell: Deduced from an Early Period, and Continued Down to the Present Time,..., Volume 2, Printed Pearson and Rollason.
