= Balata village =

Balata al-Balad
- Place

Arabic transcription(s)
  - Arabic: بلاطة البلد
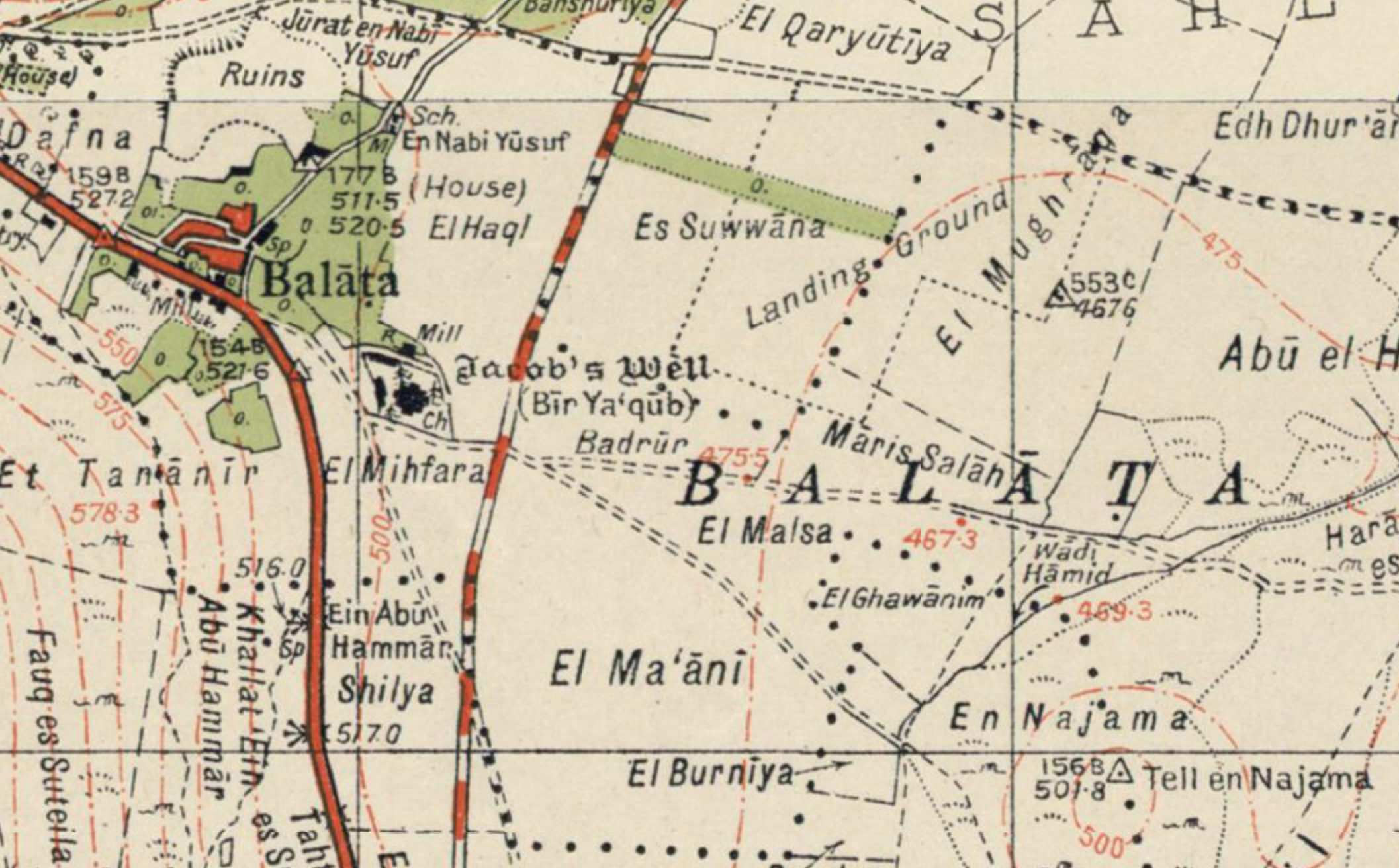
- Balata in the 1940s Survey of Palestine, with Jacob's Well (Bir Ya'qub), Joseph's Tomb (En Nabi Yusuf), and Tell Balata (labelled "Ruins")

- Location of Balata al-Balad within Palestine
- Coordinates: 32°12′42″N 35°16′59″E
- Palestine grid: 176/179
- State: State of Palestine
- Governorate: Nablus

Area
  - Total: 0.1 km^{2} (0.039 sq mi)

Population (1996)
  - Total: 5,500
  - Density: 55,000/km^{2} (140,000/sq mi)
- Name meaning: "village of Balata"

Balata village (Arabic: بلاطة البلد, romanized: Balāṭa al-Balad) is a Palestinian suburb of Nablus, in the northern West Bank, located 1 kilometer (0.62 mi) east of the city center. Formerly its own village, it was annexed to the municipality of Nablus during Jordanian rule (1948–1967). The village contains a number of well-known sites: Tell Balata (considered to be Biblical Shechem), Jacob's Well and Joseph's Tomb.

The village is just north of Balata Camp, one of the largest Palestinian refugee camps.

== Etymology ==
The village's name is Balata, the name of an old Arab village, which was preserved by local residents. Its pseudonym, al-Balad (meaning "the village"), is used to distinguish it from the Palestinian refugee camp of Balata which lies to the east and was established in 1950.

The village's name is transcribed in the writings of Eusebius (d. circa 339) and Jerome (d. 420), as Balanus or Balata. In the Samaritan chronicles, its Arabic names are transcribed as Balata ("a pavement of flat stone slabs") and Shejr al-Kheir ("tree of grace"). In the writings of Yaqut al-Hamawi (d. 1229), the Syrian geographer, its name is transcribed as al-Bulāṭa.

One theory holds that balata is a derivation of the Aramaic word Balut, meaning "acorn" (or, in Arabic, "oak"), while another theory holds that it is a derivation of the Byzantine-Roman era, from the Greek word platanos, meaning "terebinth", which grew around the village spring.

== Location ==
A suburb of the city of Nablus, the village is situated on the southern part of Tell Balata, and covers about one-third of the tell. The built-up area was made up of 2.5 hectares (25 dunams) in 1945, and increased to more than 10 hectares (100 dunams) in 1980. To the east, is a vast plain, with the ways running east–west leading out through the pass from Jerusalem to Nablus and the coast, and the way to the northeast around Mount Ebal leading down to Wadi Fa'rah and the ford across the Jordan River at Jisr el-Damiyah.

== History ==
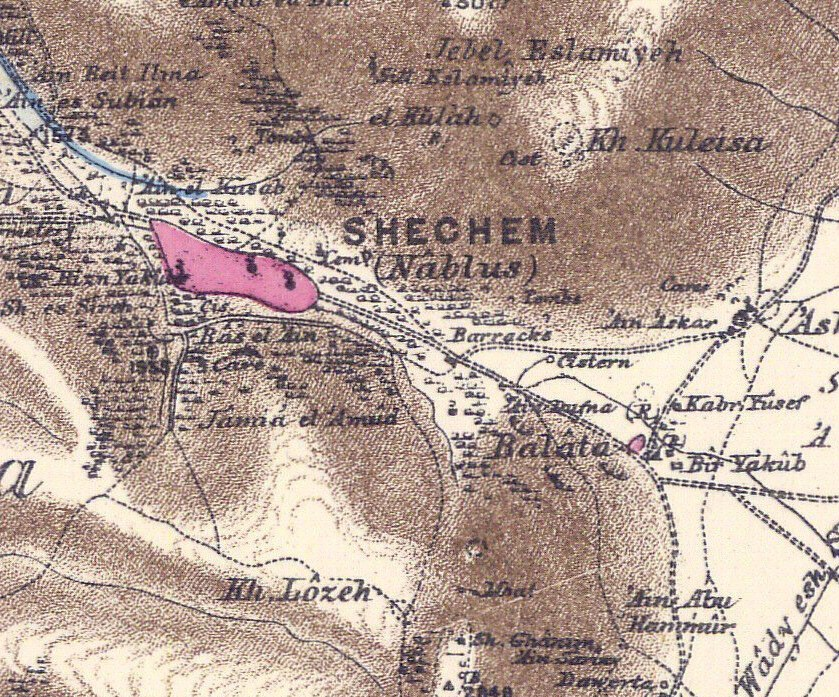
Balata in the 1880s in the PEF Survey of Palestine. Jacob's Well and Joseph's Tomb are both identified, and Nablus is stated as being the location of Biblical Shechem, in contrast to the modern identification with Tell Balata.

Balata is a village on an ancient site, and it has ancient cisterns and canals. In 1896, a Samaritan sarcophagus was found at the house of a local fellah.

The history of the village is tied to that Jacob's Well and Joseph's Tomb. Benjamin of Tudela, (d. 1173), who visited the site in the 12th century, places it "A sabbath-way distance from Sichem," and says it contains Joseph's sepulcher. Yaqut al-Hamawi (d. 1229) wrote that it was "a village of the Nablus District in Filastin. The Jews say that it was here that Nimrud (Nimrod) ibn Ka´an threw Abraham into the fire; the learned, however, say this took place at Babil (Babylon), in Irak -and Allah alone knows the truth. There is here the spring called Ain al Khidr. Yusuf (Joseph) as Sadik -peace be on him! - was buried here, and his tomb is well known, lying under the tree".

The church built around Jacob's Well and the lands of the village of Balata belonged to the Benedictine nuns of Bethany in the 12th century. Written documentation from this time of the Crusades indicates that, Balata, also known as Balathas, was a Frankish settlement.

=== Ottoman era ===
Balata al-Balad, like the rest of Palestine, was incorporated into the Ottoman Empire in 1517, and in the census of 1596 the village appeared under the name Balata as being in the Nahiya (Subdistrict) of Jabal Qubal, part of Nablus Sanjak. It had a population of 34 households, all Muslim. They paid a fixed tax-rate of 33.3% on agricultural products, including wheat, barley, summer crops, olive trees, goats and beehives, in addition to occasional revenues; a total of 5,200 akçe.

Ballata was destroyed in the early 19th century during local conflicts. It was used by barracks by Jazzar Pasha's army. Later, it was repopulated by Bedouins from Beita, as well as others from the Gaza and Hebron (Duweiqat) areas, who had previously resided in Beita.

In 1870, Victor Guérin found here a small village, with about twenty houses. It had abundant waters, which were distributed to the fields in a canal, with "beautiful antique tiles". In 1882, the Palestine Exploration Fund's Survey of Western Palestine described Balata as a small hamlet in the valley, of low howels, near a beautiful spring. On the east were figs and mulberries.

A 1900 report by Conrad Schick for the Palestine Exploration Fund describes Balata as a hamlet made up of a few huts surrounded by gardens that lay to the west of Jacob's Well and its accompanying church complex, at that time in ruins.

=== British Mandate era ===
In the 1922 census of Palestine conducted by the British Mandate authorities, Balata had a population of 461; all Muslim, increasing in the 1931 census to 574; 6 Christians and 568 Muslims, in a total of 114 houses.

In the 1945 statistics, Balata had a population of 770 Muslims, with a total of 3,000 dunams of land, living in a built-up area of 25 dunams. Of the land, 95 dunams were plantations and irrigable land, while 1,832 dunams were used for cereals.

=== Jordanian era ===
In the wake of the 1948 Arab–Israeli War, and after the 1949 Armistice Agreements, Balata al-Balad came under Jordanian rule. It was annexed by Jordan in 1950. The Palestinian refugee camp of Balata was established directly adjacent to the village in 1950. Its population is significantly larger than that of the village of Balata.

In 1961, the population was 2,292.

=== 1967, aftermath ===
Since the 1967 Six-Day War, Balata al-Balad has been under Israeli occupation.

During the First Intifada, whenever the refugee camp was placed under curfew by the Israeli occupying authorities, so too was the village.

The village contains an old mosque, five schools, and the village spring, which served as the main water source, is known as 'Ain el-Khidr. Education and medical services in the Balata refugee camp are provided by UNRWA. While electricity and running water supplies were often irregular, the camp was better off in terms of public services than the village of Balata, which lacked piped water, and depended upon private electricity generators and Israeli-run education and medical services, until some after the establishment of the Palestinian National Authority following the signing of the Oslo Accords in 1993.

USAID sponsors a flagship program involving the Balata Al-Balad Women's Society in the village that seeks to increase coordination between community-based organizations and the Palestinian Ministry of Health to improve the provision of health care services.

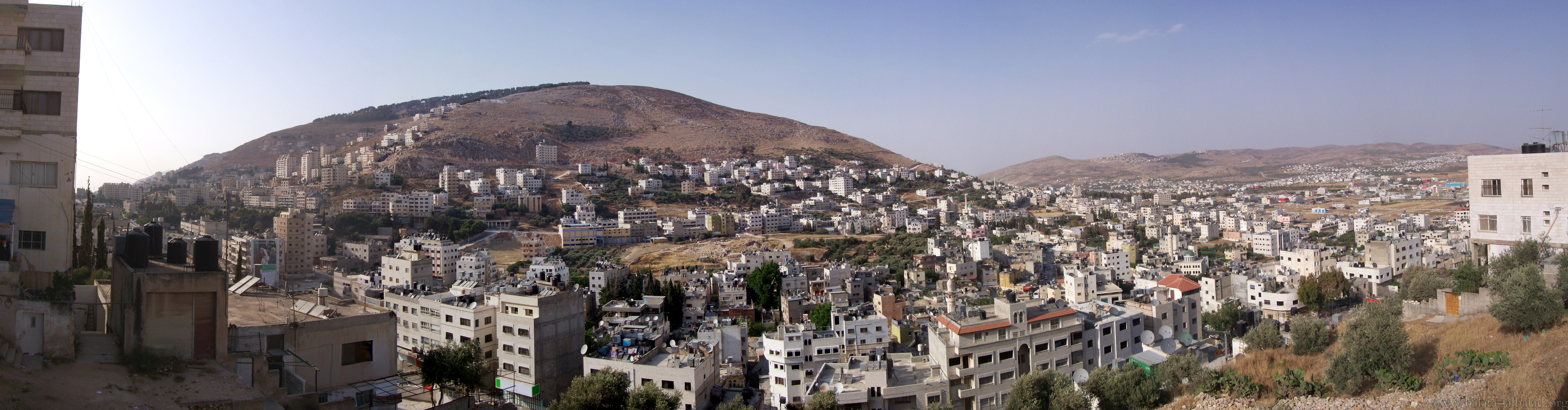
Panorama for Balata Al-Balad

== Bibliography ==
- Abujidi, Nurhan (2014). Urbicide in Palestine: Spaces of Oppression and Resilience. Routledge. ISBN 978-1-317-81884-7.
- Barron, J.B., ed. (1923). Palestine: Report and General Abstracts of the Census of 1922. Government of Palestine.
- Benjamin of Tudela; Asher, Adolf; Zunz, Leopold; Lebrecht, Fuerchtegott Schemaja (1841). The Itinerary of Rabbi Benjamin of Tudela. Vol. 1. A. Asher & co.
- Conder, C.R. (1876). "Samarian Topography". Quarterly Statement - Palestine Exploration Fund. 8 (4): 182–197. doi:10.1179/peq.1876.8.4.182. (p. 190)
- Conder, C.R. (1877). "Sychar and Sychem". Quarterly Statement - Palestine Exploration Fund. 9: 149–150. (p. 149)
- Conder, C.R.; Kitchener, H.H. (1882). The Survey of Western Palestine: Memoirs of the Topography, Orography, Hydrography, and Archaeology. Vol. 2. London: Committee of the Palestine Exploration Fund.
- Conder, C.R. (1878). Tent work in Palestine: A Record of Discovery and Adventure. Vol. 1. London R. Bentley & Son.
- Crown, Alan David; Pummer, Reinhard; Tal, Abraham (1993). A Companion to Samaritan Studies. Mohr Siebeck. ISBN 978-3-16-145666-4.
- Dauphin, C. (1998). La Palestine byzantine, Peuplement et Populations. BAR International Series 726 (in French). Vol. III : Catalogue. Oxford: Archeopress. ISBN 0-86054-905-4.
- Doumani, B. (2003). Family History in the Middle East: Household, Property, and Gender (Illustrated ed.). SUNY Press. ISBN 978-0-7914-5680-4.
- Ellenblum, R. (2003). Frankish Rural Settlement in the Latin Kingdom of Jerusalem (Illustrated ed.). Cambridge University Press. ISBN 978-0-521-52187-1.
- Forlong, J.G.R. (2018). Short Studies in the Science of Comparative Religions Embracing All the Religions of Asia (Reprint ed.). Kessinger Publishing. ISBN 978-0666205483.
- Law in the Service of Man (Organization: Rām Allāh) (1990). Punishing a nation: human rights violations during the Palestinian uprising, December 1987-December 1988 : a report. South End Press. ISBN 978-0-89608-378-3.
- Government of Jordan, Department of Statistics (1964). First Census of Population and Housing. Volume I: Final Tables; General Characteristics of the Population (PDF).
- Government of Palestine, Department of Statistics (1945). Village Statistics, April, 1945.
- Guérin, V. (1874). Description Géographique Historique et Archéologique de la Palestine (in French). Vol. 2: Samarie, pt. 1. Paris: L'Imprimerie Nationale.
- Hadawi, S. (1970). Village Statistics of 1945: A Classification of Land and Area ownership in Palestine. Palestine Liberation Organization Research Center.
- Houtsma, M.T., ed. (1987). E.J. Brill's First Encyclopaedia of Islam, 1913–1936. Vol. 1 (Reprint ed.). BRILL. ISBN 978-90-04-08265-6.
- Hütteroth, W.-D.; Abdulfattah, K. (1977). Historical Geography of Palestine, Transjordan and Southern Syria in the Late 16th Century. Erlanger Geographische Arbeiten, Sonderband 5. Erlangen, Germany: Vorstand der Fränkischen Geographischen Gesellschaft. ISBN 3-920405-41-2.
- Le Strange, G. (1890). Palestine Under the Moslems: A Description of Syria and the Holy Land from A.D. 650 to 1500. Committee of the Palestine Exploration Fund.
- Mazar, B.; Aḥituv, Shmuel (1992). Shmuel Aḥituv (ed.). Biblical Israel: State and People (Illustrated ed.). Magnes Press, Hebrew University. ISBN 978-965-223797-2.
- Mills, E., ed. (1932). Census of Palestine 1931. Population of Villages, Towns and Administrative Areas. Jerusalem: Government of Palestine.
- Moors, Annelies (1995). Women, Property, and Islam: Palestinian Experiences, 1920–1990 (Illustrated ed.). Cambridge University Press. ISBN 978-0-521-48355-1.
- Palmer, E.H. (1881). The Survey of Western Palestine: Arabic and English Name Lists Collected During the Survey by Lieutenants Conder and Kitchener, R. E. Transliterated and Explained by E.H. Palmer. Committee of the Palestine Exploration Fund.
- Pfeiffer, Charles F., ed. (1966). The Biblical world: a dictionary of Biblical archaeology (Illustrated ed.). Baker Book House. ISBN 978-0-8010-6915-4.
- Pringle, D. (1993). The Churches of the Crusader Kingdom of Jerusalem: A-K (excluding Acre and Jerusalem). Vol. I. Cambridge University Press. ISBN 0-521-39036-2.
- Schick, C. (1900). "Notes on Jacob's Well". Quarterly Statement - Palestine Exploration Fund. 32: 61–63. doi:10.1179/peq.1900.32.1.61.
- Wright, George R.H (1985). Ancient building in South Syria and Palestine, Volume 1. Brill Archive. ISBN 978-90-04-07091-2.
