= Tell Balata =

Site of an ancient Canaanite/Israelite city in the West Bank

- تل بلاطة (Arabic)
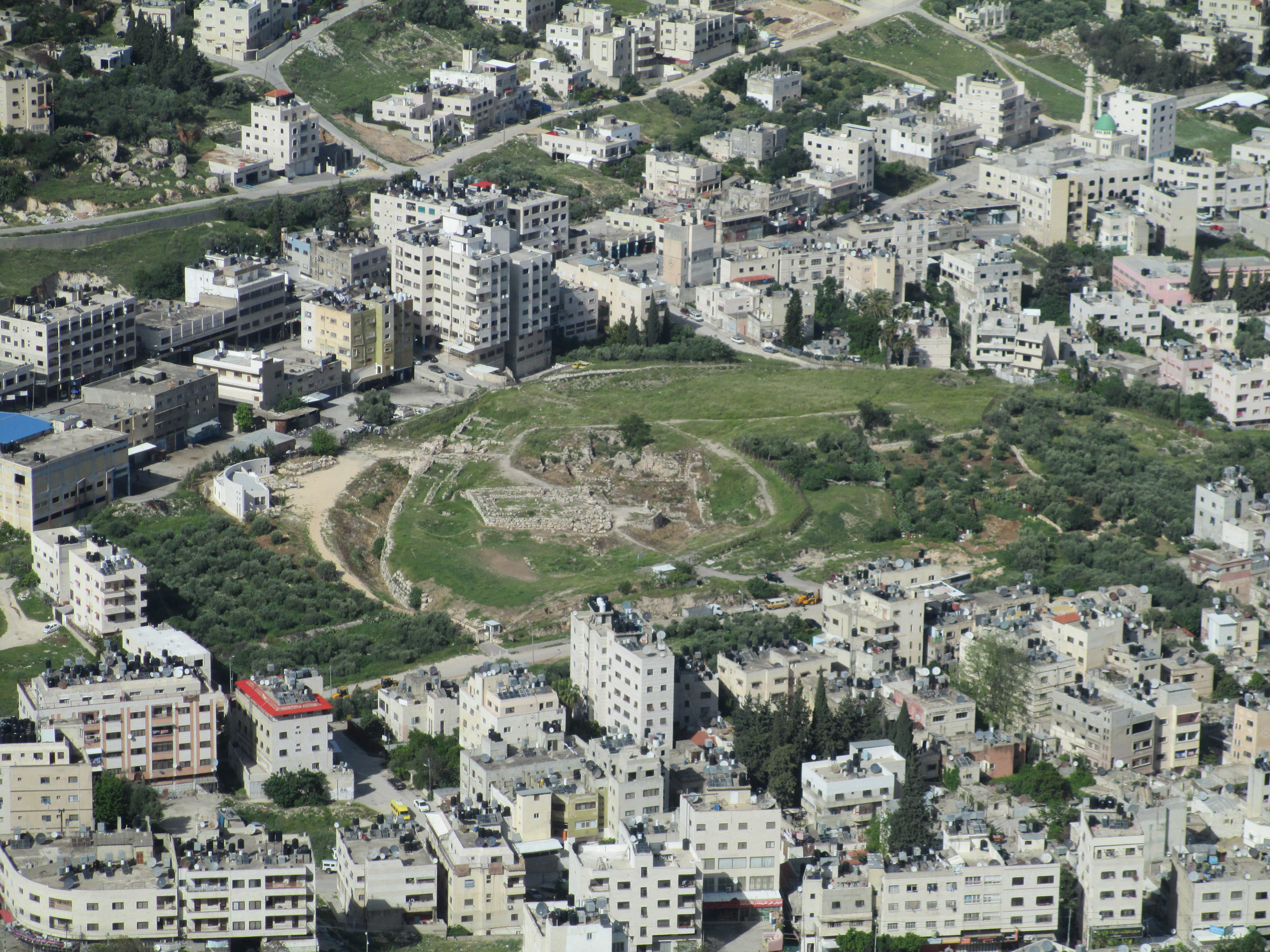
- .

- Location within the West Bank
- 32.213618°N 35.281993°E
- Periods: Bronze Age, Iron Age, Hellenistic period
- Cultures: Canaanite, Israelite, Samaritan, Hellenistic
- Location: Nablus, West Bank, Palestine

Site notes
- Archaeologists: Hamdan Taha; Gerrit van der Kooij

Tell Balata (Arabic: تل بلاطة) is an archaeological site in the West Bank near Nablus, Palestine, that includes the remains of an ancient Canaanite city, associated since 1913 with the Biblical city of Shechem. The built-up area of Balata, a Palestinian village and suburb of Nablus, covers about one-third of the tell, and overlooks a vast plain to the east. The Palestinian village of Salim is located 4.5 kilometers (2.8 mi) to the east.

The site is listed by UNESCO as part of the Inventory of Cultural and Natural Heritage Sites of Potential Outstanding Universal Value in the State of Palestine. Experts estimate that the towers and buildings at the site date back 5,000 years to the Chalcolithic and Bronze Ages.

== Modern name ==
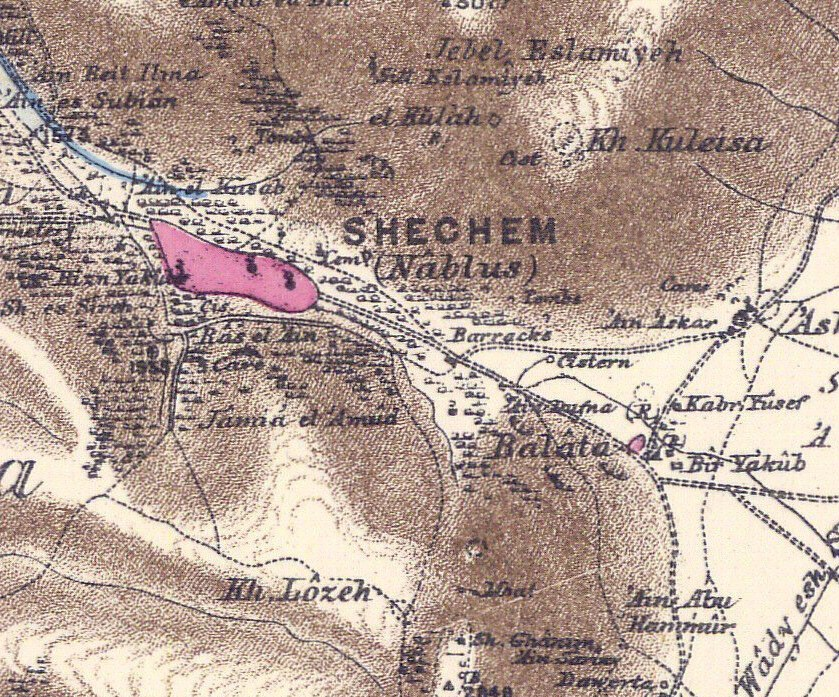
Balata in the 1880s in the PEF Survey of Palestine. Nablus is stated as being the location of Biblical Shechem, in contrast to the modern identification with Tell Balata.

Tell is an old Semitic word for an archaeological mound, long used by Arabic-speaking Fellahin. Balata is the name of the ancient Arab village located on the tell, and of the adjacent Palestinian refugee camp of Balata established in 1950. The name was preserved by local residents and used to refer both to the village and the hill (and later on, the refugee camp).

One theory holds that balata is a derivation of the Aramaic word Balut, meaning acorn; another theory holds that it is a derivation of the Byzantine-Roman era, from the Greek word platanos, meaning "terebinth", a type of tree that grew around the spring of Balata. The local Samaritan community traditionally called the site 'The Holy Oak' or 'The Tree of Grace'.

== Identification as ancient Shechem ==
Traditionally, the site has been associated with the biblical Samaritan city of Shechem, said by Josephus to have been destroyed by John Hyrcanus I; this is based on circumstantial evidence such as its location and preliminary evidence of habitation during the late Bronze and early Iron Ages. Tell Balata lies in a mountain pass between Mount Gerizim and Mount Ebal, a location that fits well with the geographical description provided for Shechem in the Bible. No inscriptional evidence to support this conclusion has been found in situ, and other sites have also been identified as the possible site of the biblical Shechem; for example, Y. Magen locates that city nearby on Mount Gerizim, at a site covering an area of 30 hectares.

== Archaeology ==
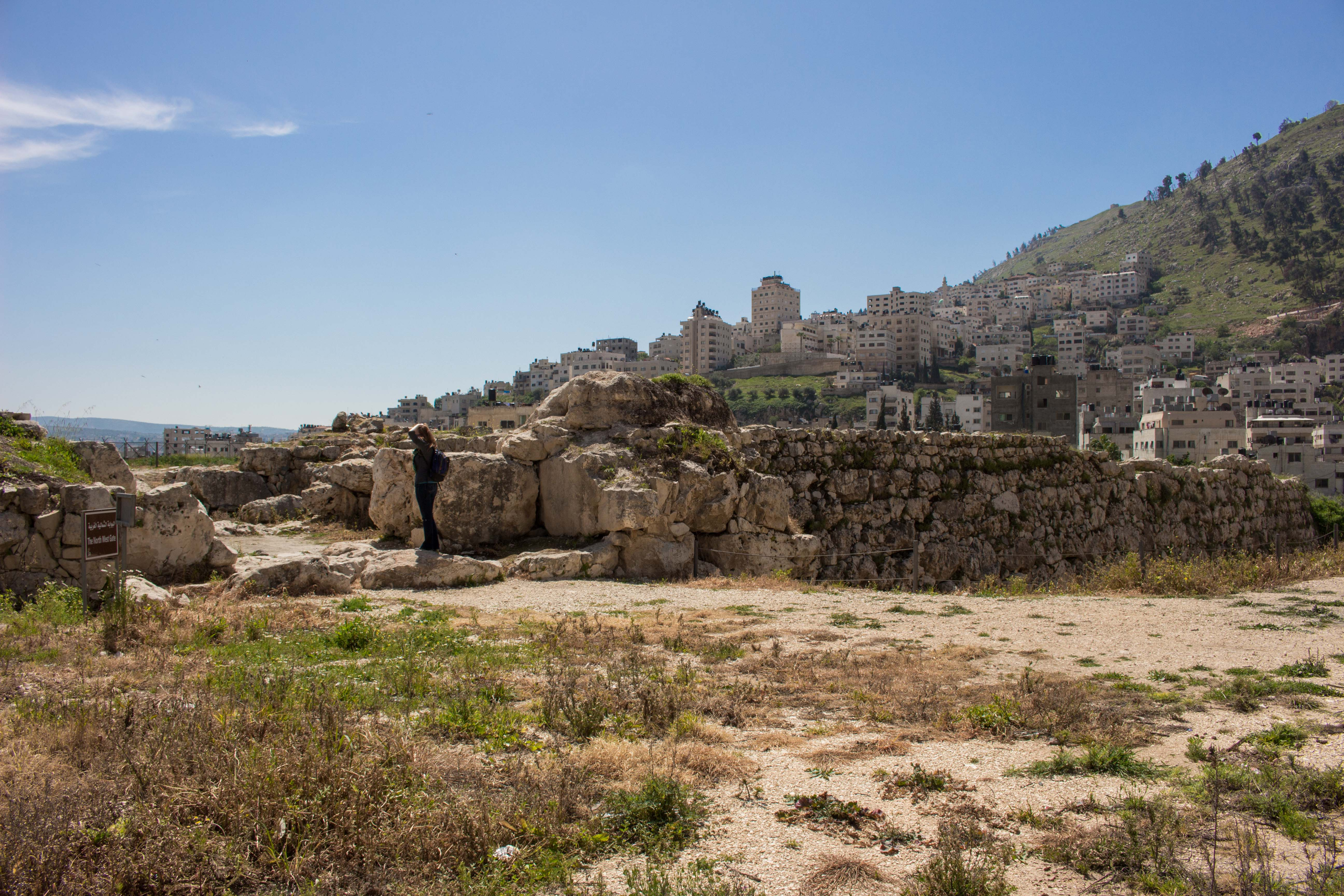
Tell Balata

The site was first excavated by a German team led by Ernst Sellin from 1913 to 1914. After the end of World War I, work by Sellin was resumed in 1926 and lasted until 1934 with the last few seasons led by G. Welter.

Excavations were conducted at Tell Balata by the American Schools of Oriental Research, Drew University, and the McCormick Theological Seminary in 8 seasons between 1956 and 1964 when the West Bank was under the rule of Jordan. Archaeologists who took part in this expedition included Paul and Nancy Lapp, Albert Glock, Lawrence Toombs, Edward Campbell, Robert Bull, Joe Seeger, and William G. Dever, among others. Further excavations are to be undertaken by Palestinian archaeologists along with students from the University of Leiden in the Netherlands as part of a joint effort funded by the Dutch government.

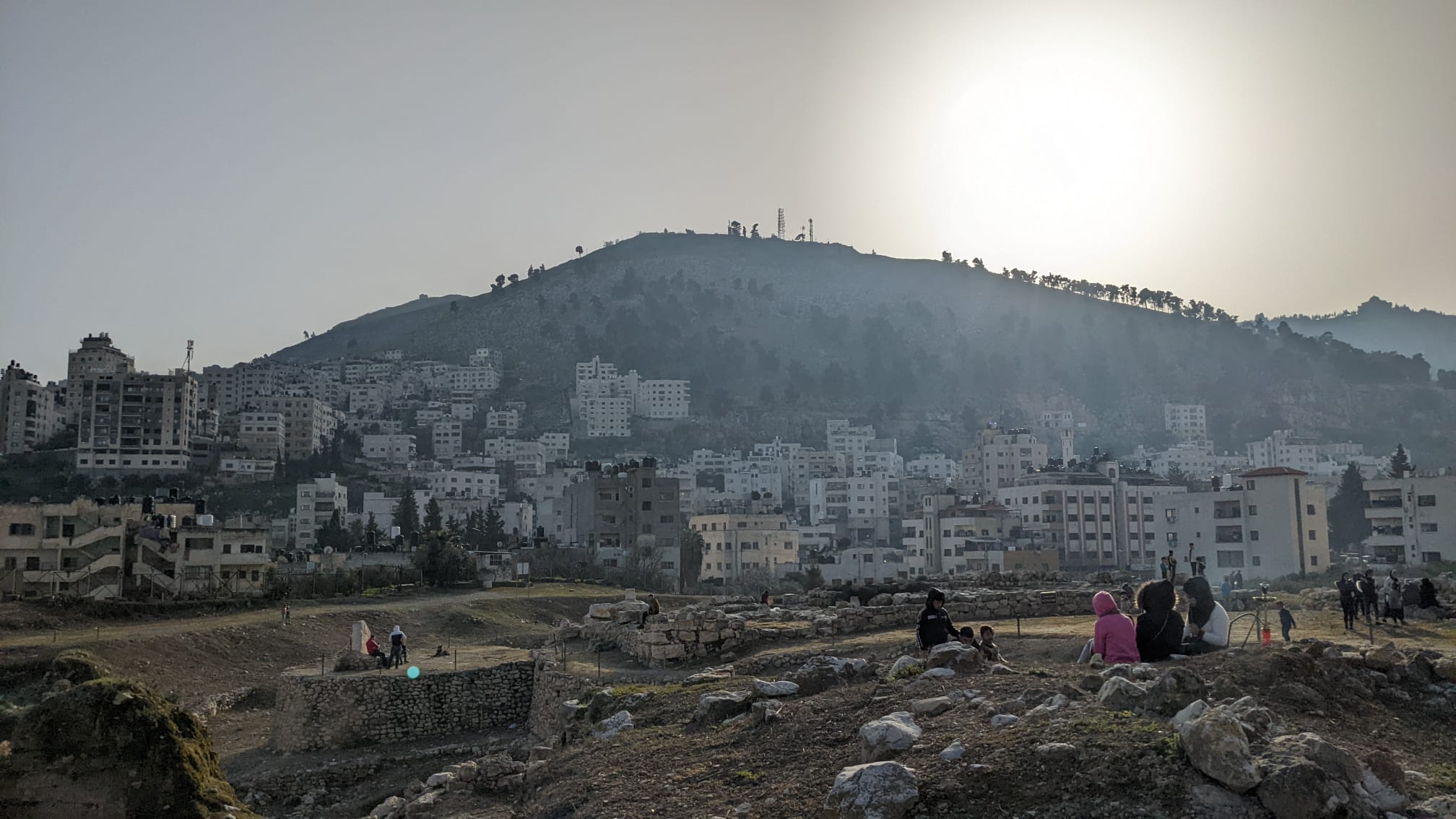
Tell Balata in 2022

A 2002 final published report on the stratigraphic and architectural evidence at Tell Balata indicates that there was a break in occupation between the end of the Late Bronze Age (c. 1150 BC) through to the early Iron Age II (c. 975 BC). A small quadrangular altar discovered in Tell Balata, similar to ones found in other Iron Age sites such as Tel Arad and Tel Dan, may have been used for burning incense.

One of the oldest coins discovered in Palestine was an electrum Greek Macedonian coin, dated to circa 500 BC, found at Tell Balata. There is evidence that the site was inhabited in the Hellenistic period until the end of the 2nd century BC. This Hellenistic era city was founded in the late 4th century BC and extended over an area of 6 hectares. The built structure shows evidence of considerable damage dated to the 190s BC, and attributed to Antiochus III's conquest of Israel. Habitation continued until the final destruction of the city at this site in the late 2nd century BC.

Further excavations were carried out between 2010 and 2011.

== See also ==
- Cities of the ancient Near East
