= Shechem =

Biblical city in the West Bank

- שְׁכֶם (Biblical Hebrew)
- Sichem
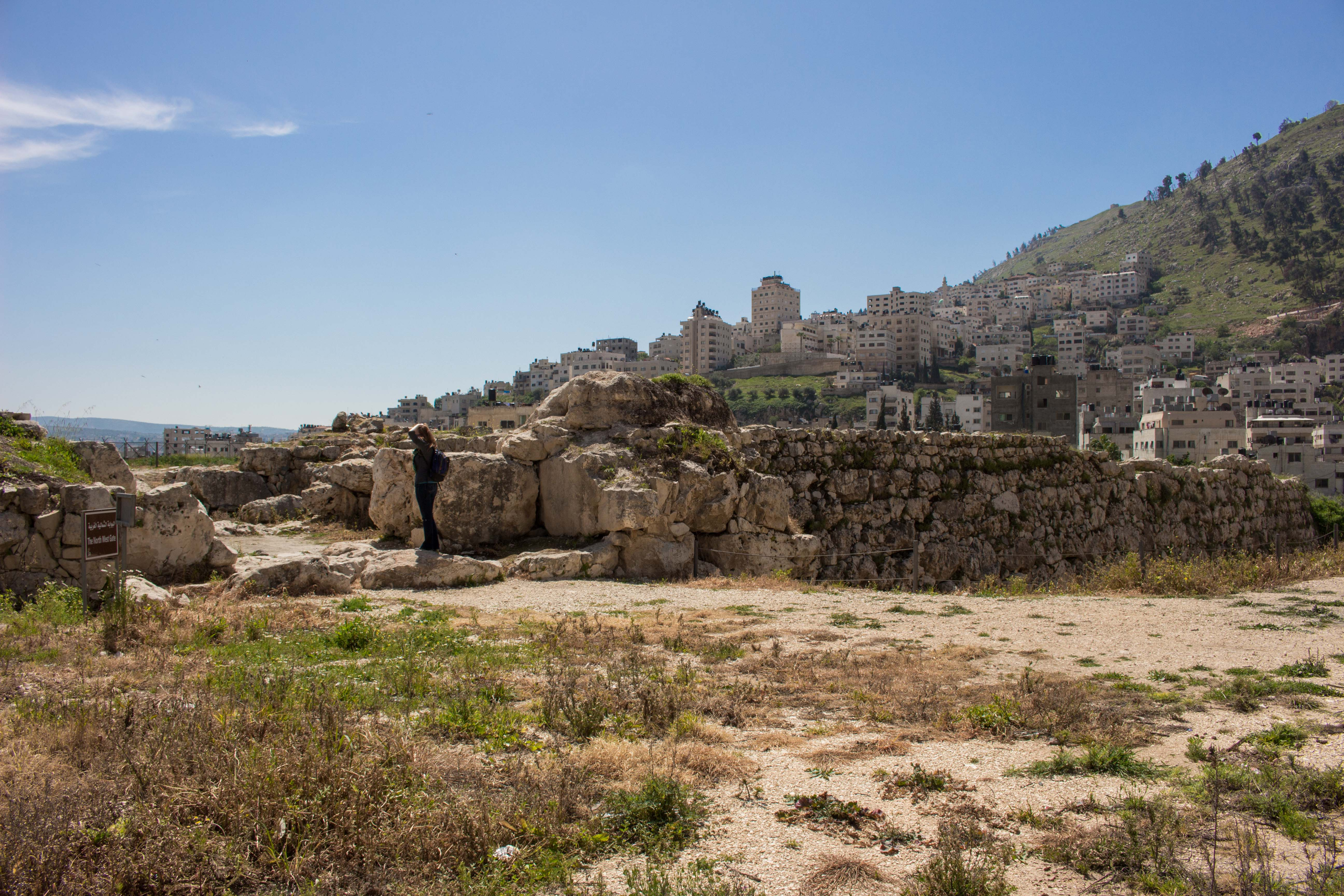
- Archaeological site of Tell Balata, identified with ancient Shechem

- Location within the West Bank Location within the Eastern Mediterranean
- 32.213618°N 35.281993°E
- Type: Capital city
- Associated with: Canaanites, Israelites, Samaritans
- Location: Tell Balata, West Bank, Palestine
- Region: Southern Levant

History
- Built: c. 1900 BC
- Abandoned: 67 AD (destroyed)

Shechem (/ʃəˈkɛm/ shə-KEM; Biblical Hebrew: שְׁכֶם, romanized: Šəḵem, Biblical pronunciation: [ʃəˈxɛm]; Samaritan Hebrew: ࠔࠬࠥࠊࠝࠌ, romanized: Šăkēm), also spelled Sichem (/sɪˈkɛm/ sik-KEM; in the Septuagint, Koine Greek: Συχέμ, romanized: Sykhém) and other variants, was an ancient city in the Southern Levant. Described in ancient Egyptian inscriptions from the 19th century BC as a part of Retjenu, it is also recorded as a Canaanite city in the 14th century BC Amarna letters.

In the Hebrew Bible, it is described as the first capital of the Kingdom of Israel (Samaria) following the split of the United Monarchy. According to Joshua 21:20–21, it was located in the tribal territorial allotment of the tribe of Ephraim. Shechem declined after the fall of the Kingdom of Israel. The city later regained its importance as a prominent Samaritan center during the Hellenistic period.

Traditionally associated with the city of Nablus, Shechem is now identified with the nearby site of Tell Balata in Balata village in the West Bank, Palestine.

== Etymology ==
The name of Shechem is attested as sꜣkꜣmꜣꜣ in Ancient Egyptian and Ša-ak-mi in Amarna letter 289, which indicates the first consonant was */θ/ at this time. The name שְׁכֶם was understood to be derived from the Hebrew word שְׁכֶם shěkem "shoulder, saddle", from Proto-West Semitic *ṯVkm- "the lowest part of the neck". The sense of "shoulder" corresponds with the mountainous configuration of the city.

== Geographical position ==
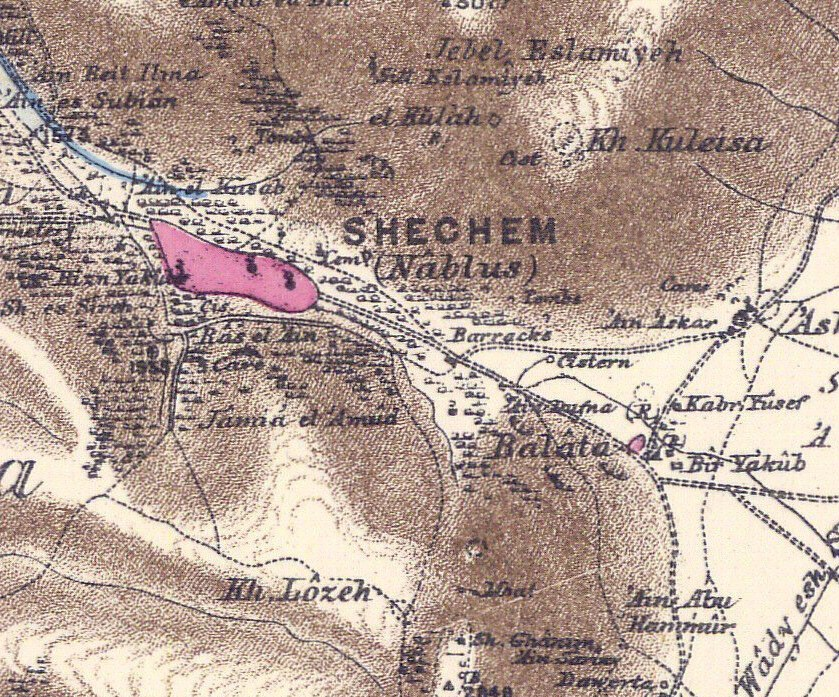
Balata in the 1880s in the PEF Survey of Palestine. Nablus is stated as being the location of Biblical Shechem, in contrast to the modern identification with Tell Balata.

Shechem's position is indicated in the Hebrew Bible: it lay north of Bethel and Shiloh, on the high road going from Jerusalem to the northern districts (Judges xxi, 19), at a short distance from Michmethath (Joshua 17:7) and of Dothain (Genesis 37:12–17); it was in the hill-country of Ephraim (Joshua 20:7; 21:21; 1 Kings 12:25; 1 Chronicles 6:67; 7:28), immediately below Mount Gerizim (Judges 9:6–7). These indications are substantiated by Josephus, who says that the city lay between Mount Ebal and Mount Gerizim, and by the Madaba map, which places its Sykhem between one of its two sets of "Tour Gobel" (Ebal) and the "Tour Garizin" (Garizim). The site of Shechem in patristic sources is almost invariably identified with, or located close to, the town of Flavia Neapolis (Nablus).

== History ==
Shechem (Tell Balata) was situated in a narrow valley separating Mount Ebal and Mount Gerizim, two of the largest mountains in Samaria. This valley was a principal highway for merchants and travelers moving in the hills between northern and southern Israel (see Way of the Patriarchs), and made Shechem a crucial trade hub in this region.

- Nearby sites: Tell Dothan towards Jenin and the Yizreel Valley, and Tell el-Farah North, north of Jerusalem (50 km).
- An abundance of water, thanks to numerous natural springs and a high, stable water table, which made digging new wells easy. The fertile valley soil allowed an economy based on agriculture and livestock.

=== Chalcolithic ===
The oldest settlement in Shechem goes back to about five thousand years ago, during the Chalcolithic period (3500-3000 BC). At that time agriculture was already practiced.

=== Early Bronze ===
During the Early Bronze Age, activity seems to have moved to the nearby area of Khirbet Makhneh el-Fauqa. Some publications claim that Shechem is mentioned in the third-millennium Ebla tablets, but this has been denied by archaeologists.

=== Middle Bronze ===
==== Middle Bronze IIA ====
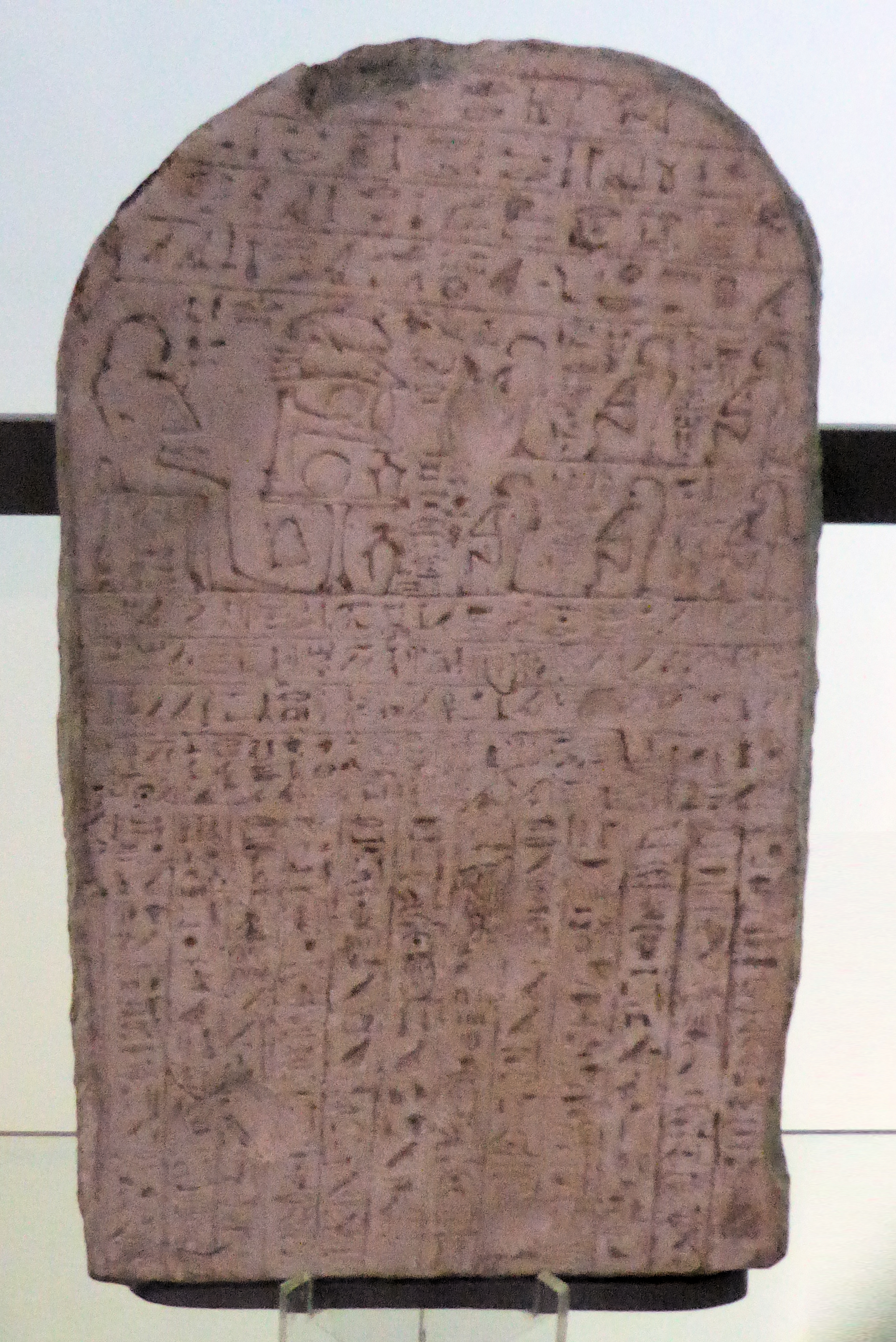
The Sebek-khu Stele, dated to the reign of Senusret III (reign: 1878–1839 BC), records the earliest known Egyptian military campaign in the Levant. The text reads "Then Sekmem fell, together with the wretched Retenu", where Sekmem (s-k-m-m) is thought to be Shechem, and the "Retunu" or "Retjenu" a people of the Levant.

The first substantial building activity at Shechem (Strata XXII-XXI) dates from the Middle Bronze Age IIA (c. 1900 BC). It became a very substantial Canaanite settlement, and was attacked by Egypt, as mentioned in the Sebek-khu Stele, an Egyptian stele of a noble at the court of Senusret III (c. 1880–1840 BC).

==== Middle Bronze IIB ====
Fortifications were made in the MB IIB (XX-XIX).

This period marks the "urban revolution" of Shechem, where the site was transformed into a fortified stronghold. The Temenos 1 Wall: A massive enclosure wall was constructed to segregate the sacred area from the residential quarters. The Courtyard Temples: Archaeological evidence shows a series of three superimposed courtyard temples (901, 902, and 939) within the sacred precinct. These structures follow a Syrian-influenced architectural plan (Campbell, 2002). The city’s first true defensive wall (Wall D, an orthostat-lined structure) was erected during this phase.

The MB IIB pottery was studied by Cole.

In Field VI the general strata were XVII (MB IIC), XVIII, XIX and XX (MB IIA-B or MB IIA).

- In Field VI Stratum XX (MB IIA or MB IIA/B) is later than Tel Beit Mirsim G-F but earned the designation MB IIA-B, while Mazar (1967) saw Str. XX contemporary with Megiddo XII (MB IIA).
- In Field VI Stratum XIX (MB IIB1). (cf. Tel Beit Mirsim E)
- In Field VI Stratum XVIII (MB IIB2). (cf. Tel Beit Mirsim E)
- In Field VI Stratum XVII (MB IIC) pottery reflect a ceramic tradition more consistent with the preceding MB IIB strata.

In early MB IIB (MB IIB1), the western part of the city was separated from the other areas by a large north-south wall (Temenos Wall 900). Some 20 m to the west was a major wall (Wall D) marking the outer defense of the city.

==== Middle Bronze IIC ====
The Middle Bronze IIC (c. 1590-1550 BC), coincides with the Hyksos period in the south and Egypt, and LB IA in the Northern Levant following the Hittite invasion.

Strata XVI–XV: Shechem reached its zenith of power and size during the MB IIC, characterized by massive monumental architecture. The Fortress Temple (Migdal): The courtyard temples were replaced by a massive "Fortress Temple" (Temple 2048). Its walls were approximately 5 meters thick, supporting a multi-story tower structure. This reflects the "Migdal" style prevalent in MB II Canaan (Mazar, 1990). The city defenses were expanded. Wall A was a massive cyclopean wall, which was later supplemented by Wall B, a casemate wall system. Two sophisticated multi-chambered gates were constructed, providing controlled access to the city and the temple precinct.

=== Late Bronze ===
==== Late Bronze IIA ====
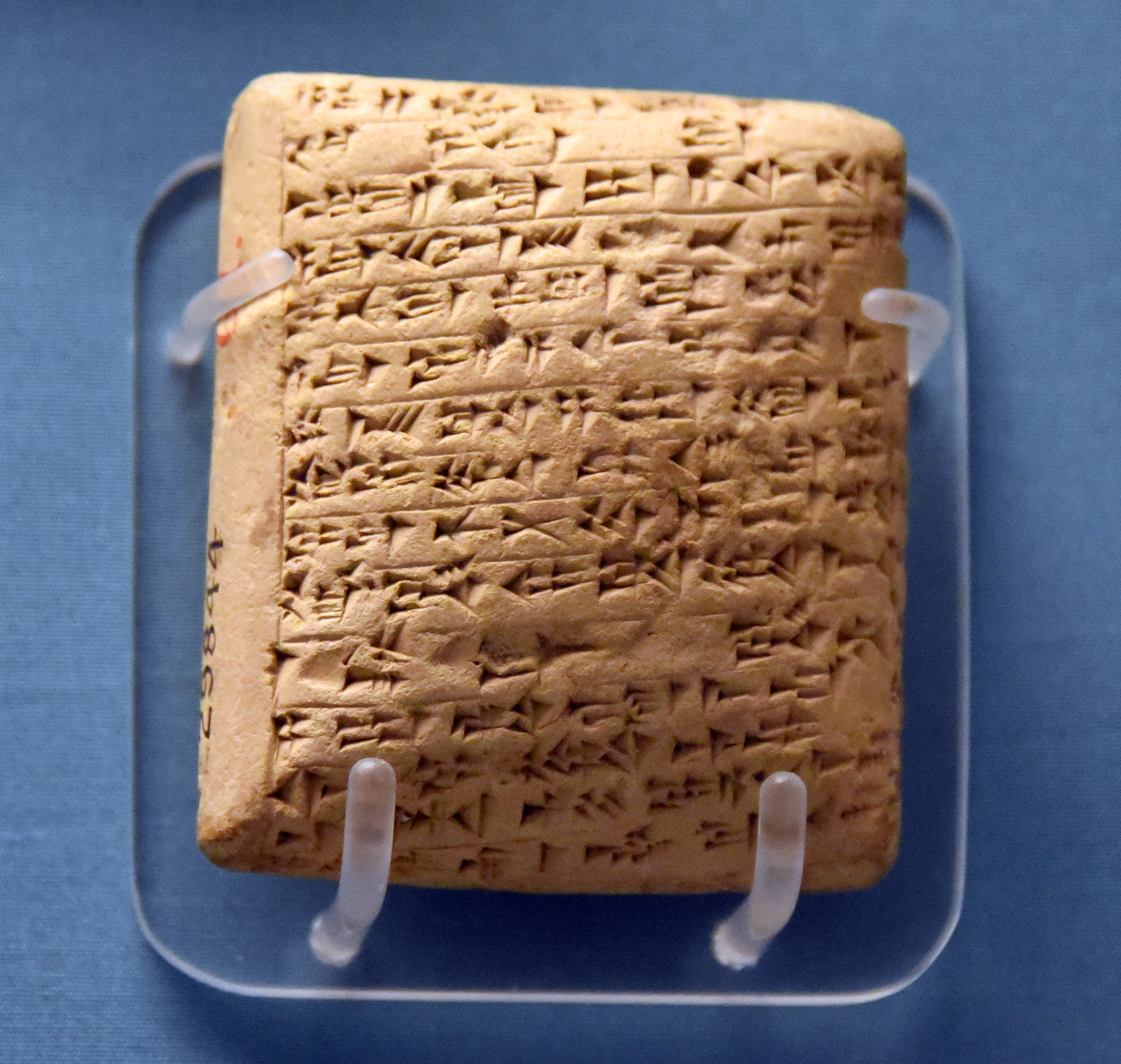
Amarna letter EA 252. Letter from Labayu (ruler of Shechem) to the Egyptian Pharaoh Amenhotep III or his son Akhenaten. 14th century BC. From Tell el-Amarna, Egypt. British Museum

In the Amarna letters of about 1350 BC, Šakmu (i.e., Shechem) was the center of a kingdom carved out by Labaya (or Labayu), a Canaanite prince who recruited mercenaries from among the Habiru. Labaya was the author of three Amarna letters (EA 252, EA 253, and EA 254), and his name appears in 11 of the other 382 letters, referred to 28 times, with the basic topic of the letter, being Labaya himself, and his relationship with the rebelling, countryside Habiru.

==== Late Bronze IIB ====
Shechem may be identical to the Sakama mentioned in an account dated to the Nineteenth Dynasty of Egypt (around 1200 BC). (See Papyrus Anastasi I.)

=== Iron Age ===
A 2002 final published report on the stratigraphic and architectural evidence at Tell Balata indicates that there was a break in occupation between the end of the Late Bronze Age (c. 1150 BC) through to the early Iron Age II (c. 975 BC). A small quadrangular altar discovered in Tell Balata, similar to ones found in other Iron Age sites such as Tel Arad and Tel Dan, may have been used for burning incense.

==== Iron Age II ====
During the Iron Age II, Shechem was a city in the northern Kingdom of Israel. It had an estimated population of 1,200 during the 9th and 8th centuries BC, according to archaeologist William G. Dever.

During the Babylonian captivity (606 to 536 BC), Judean and Samarian remnants reestablished an altar at Shechem to keep the Israelite worship system going when access to both the Temple in Jerusalem and Mount Gerizim was cut off.

=== Classical antiquity ===
==== Hellenistic Period ====
During the Hellenistic and Roman periods, Shechem was the main settlement of the Samaritans, whose religious center stood on Mount Gerizim, just outside the town.

==== Roman Period - Province of Judea ====
In 6 AD, Shechem was annexed to the Roman Empire as the province of Judea. Samaritans rose up in arms on Mount Gerizim at the time of the Galilee campaign in 67, which was part of the First Jewish–Roman War. Josephus, The Jewish War, III, vii, 32 states that Sextus Vettulenus Cerialis destroyed Shechem during that war.

In 72 AD, a new city, Flavia Neapolis, was built by Vespasian 2 kilometers (1.2 mi) to the west of the old one; it is the origin of the current place-name of Nablus. Josephus, Antiquities of the Jews 4.8.44, placed the city between Mount Gerizim and Mount Ebal. Elsewhere, he refers to it simply as "Neapolis".

Aa18 Z1 V31 G1 U1 G1 T14 N25
sꜣkꜣmꜣꜣ
in hieroglyphs
Era: New Kingdom
(1550–1069 BC)

During Emperor Hadrian's reign, the temple on Mount Gerizim was restored and dedicated to Jupiter.

Like Shechem, Neapolis had a very early Christian community, including the early saint Justin Martyr; bishops of Neapolis are mentioned. On several occasions, the Christians suffered greatly at the hands of the Samaritans. In 474, the emperor, to avenge what Christians considered an unjust attack by the Samaritans, deprived the latter of Mount Gerizim and gave it to the Christians, who built on it a church dedicated to the Mary, mother of Jesus.

=== Later history ===
The city of Nablus was Islamicized in the Abbasid and Ottoman periods. In 1903 near Nablus, a German party of archaeologists led by Dr. Hermann Thiersch stumbled upon the site called Tell Balata and now identified as ancient Shechem. Nablus is still referred to as Shechem by Israeli Hebrew speakers, even though the original site of Shechem lies east of the modern-day city.

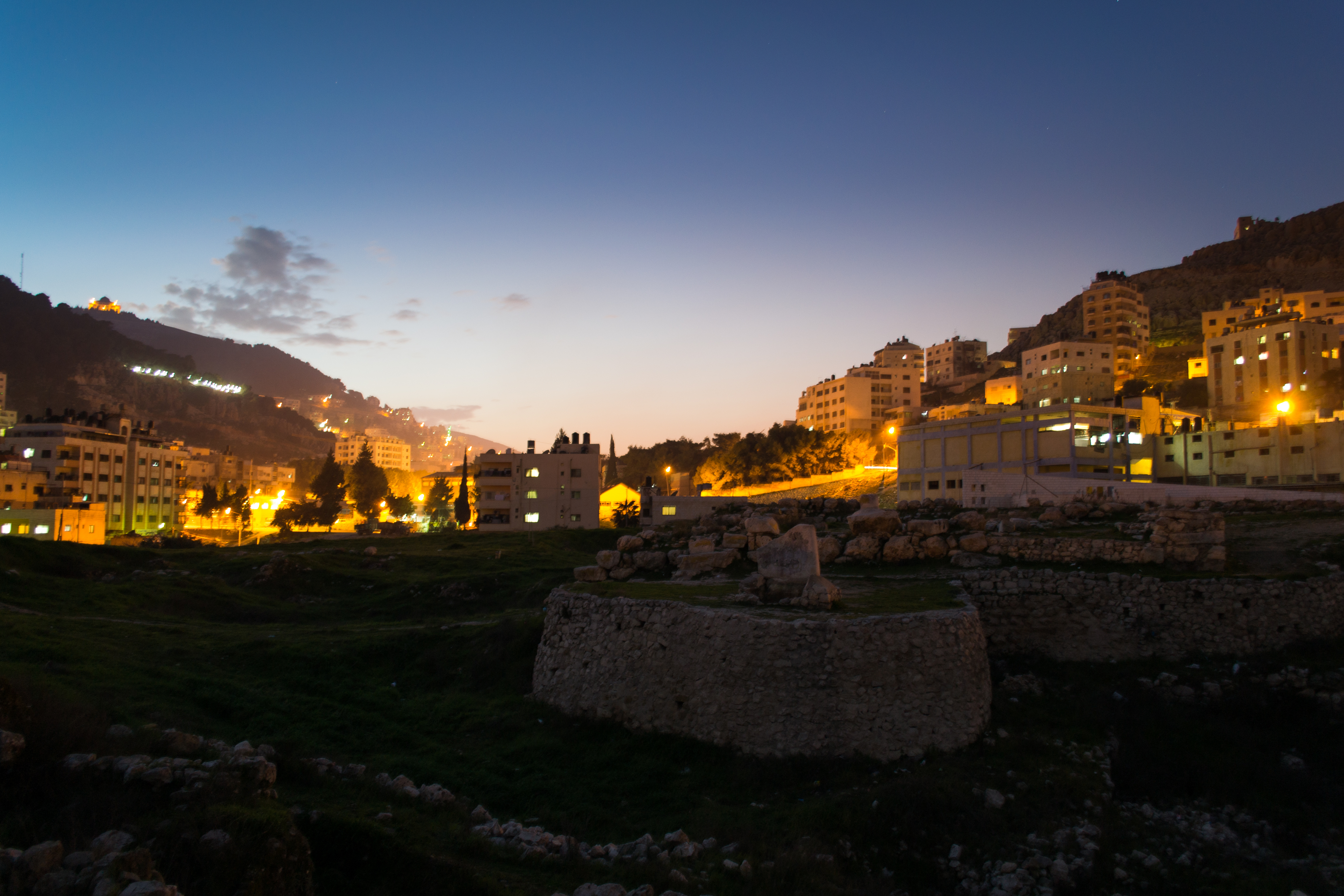
Shechem in 2013

== In the Bible ==
Shechem is mentioned 60 times in the Bible.

=== Hebrew Bible (Old Testament) ===
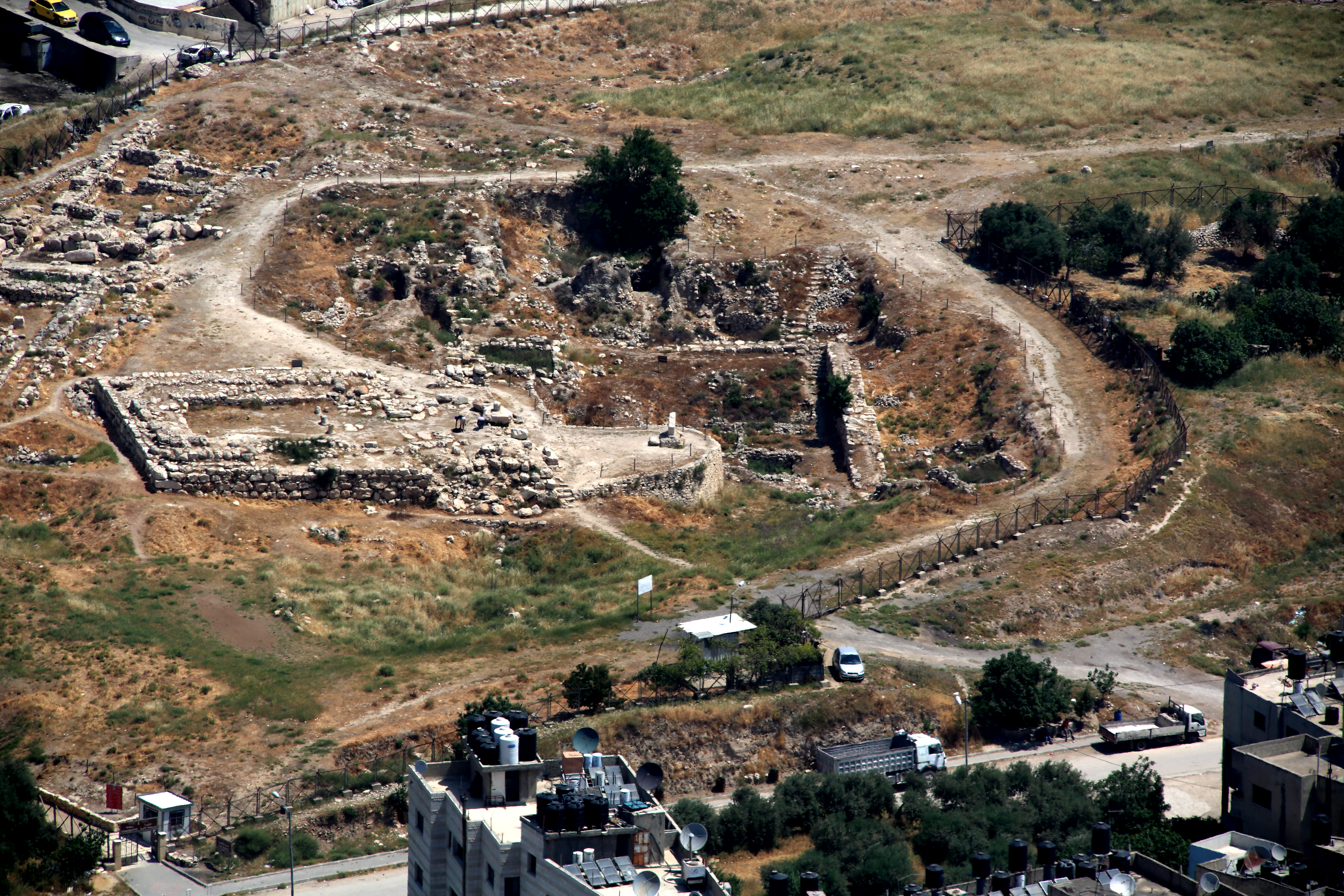
The old city of Shechem as seen from Mitzpe Yosef

Genesis, Deuteronomy, Joshua and Judges hallow Shechem over all other cities of the land of Israel. Shechem first appears in the Hebrew Bible in Genesis 12:6–8, which says that Abraham reached the "great tree of Moreh" at Shechem and offered sacrifice nearby. According to this passage, Abram "built an altar to the LORD and called on the name of the LORD", who had appeared to him and had given that land to his descendants at Shechem. The account states that on this occasion, God confirmed the covenant first made with Abraham in Harran, regarding the possession of the land of Canaan.

Jacob, Abraham's grandson, came to "the city of Shechem" in Genesis 33:18. This verse can be seen as Jacob coming to Shechem, the city, or to a city belonging to a person called Shechem. R. N. Whybray favours the latter reading "on grounds of Hebrew syntax".

Later, two of his sons, Simeon (Shimon) and Levi, avenged their sister Dinah's abduction and rape by "Shechem the son of Hamor the Hivite, the prince of the land" of Shechem. Jacob's sons said to the Shechemites that if "every male among you is circumcised, then we will give our daughters to you and take your daughters to ourselves". Once the Shechemites agree to the mass circumcision, however, Jacob's sons, except for Joseph, exploit the following soreness, with Shimon and Levi massacring all of the city's men, and the rest robbing their treasures, and stealing their women. This eventually leads to Shimon and Levi not getting a blessing from Jacob for betraying his trust, hurting innocents, misusing religious rites and endangering their tribe to the wrath of neighbouring people.

Following the settlement of the Israelites in Canaan after their Exodus from Egypt, according to the biblical narrative, Joshua assembled the Israelites at Shechem and asked them to choose between serving the God of Abraham who had delivered them from Egypt, or the false gods which their ancestors had served on the other side of the Euphrates River, or the gods of the Amorites in whose land they now lived. The people chose to serve the God of the Bible, a decision which Joshua recorded in the Book of the Law of God, and he then erected a memorial stone "under the oak that was by" in Shechem. The oak is associated with the Oak of Moreh where Abram had set up camp during his travels in this area. Shechem and its surrounding lands were given as a Levitical city to the Kohathites.

Owing to its central position, no less than to the presence in the neighborhood of places hallowed by the memory of Abraham (Genesis 12:6, 7; 34:5), Jacob's Well (Genesis 33:18–19; 34:2, etc.), and Joseph's tomb (Joshua 24:32), the city was destined to play an important part in the history of Israel. Jerubbaal (Gideon), whose home was at Ophrah, visited Shechem, and his concubine who lived there was mother of his son Abimelech (Judges 8:31). She came from one of the leading Shechemite families who were influential with the "Lords of Shechem" (Judges 9:1–3, wording of the New Revised Standard Version and New American Bible Revised Edition).

After Gideon's death, Abimelech was made king (Judges 9:1–45). Jotham, the youngest son of Gideon, made an allegorical speech on Mount Gerizim in which he warned the people of Shechem about Abimelech's future tyranny (Judges 9:7–20). When the city rose in rebellion three years later, Abimelech took it, utterly destroyed it, and burnt the temple of Baal-berith where the people had fled for safety. The city was rebuilt in the 10th century BC and was probably the capital of Ephraim (1 Kings 4). Shechem was the place appointed, after Solomon's death, for the meeting of the people of Israel and the investiture of his son Rehoboam as king; the meeting ended in the secession of the ten northern tribes, and Shechem, fortified by Jeroboam, became the capital of the new kingdom (1 Kings 12:1; 14:17; 2 Chronicles 10:1).

After the kings of Israel moved, first to Tirzah (1 Kings 14:17) and later on to Samaria, Shechem lost its importance, and we do not hear of it until after the fall of Jerusalem (587 BC; Jeremiah 12:5). The events connected with the restoration were to bring it again into prominence. During his second visit to Jerusalem, Nehemiah banished the grandson of the High Priest Eliashib (whom the historian Josephus likely identifies as Manasse in chapters 7 and 8 of Antiquities, Book XI). A large faction of Jewish priests and everyday citizens supported this rebel priest, and they all fled Jerusalem together to resettle in the city of Shechem. Once there, they constructed a rival, breakaway temple on Mount Gerizim, which officially established Shechem the "holy city" of the Samaritans and cementing the feud between the Jews and Samaritans.

Generations later, when the brutal Greek king Antiochus IV heavily persecuted traditional Jews in Jerusalem, the Samaritans were left completely unharmed. Because Samaria remained a safe haven, any Jews from Jerusalem who chose to abandon their ancestral laws (documented as "antinomianism" in the Books of Maccabees), fled north as political renegades and religious apostates. The Samaritans welcomed these Jewish refugees with open arms, a policy that Josephus notes in Antiquities XI, viii. However, this long-standing rivalry came to a violent end around 128 BC, when the Jewish Hasmonean ruler John Hyrcanus conquered the region and completely destroyed the Samaritan temple, as recorded in Antiquities XIII, ix. In 107 BC, Hyrcanus returned and destroyed the city of Shechem, turning the once-important capital into ruins from which it never recovered.

The Book of Judith, which is considered scripture to the Roman Catholic, Eastern Orthodox and other Christian churches is set in a city called "Bethulia". Because there is no Bethulia, it is widely assumed that this is a pseudonym for another city. The most common theory is that the city of Bethulia is really Shechem, based on the geography described in the book. The Jewish Encyclopedia went as far as to state that Shechem is the only city to meet all the requirements for Bethulia's location, and stated: "The identity of Bethulia with Shechem is thus beyond all question".

=== New Testament ===
Shechem is mentioned in the Book of Acts (Acts 7, Acts 7:16).

It is not known whether the Samaritan city of Sychar (Ancient Greek: Συχάρ, romanized: Sykhár) in the Gospel of John (John 4:5) refers to Shechem or to another nearby village: "So he came to a Samaritan city called Sychar, near the plot of ground that Jacob had given to his son Joseph."

John 4 (John 4:15) mentions one of the women of Sychar going to Jacob's Well. Some scholars believe the location of Sychar is at the foot of Mount Ebal, but other scholars disagree because the proposed location is 1 km (0.62 mi) from Jacob's Well, which they think is not close enough for the women of Sychar to have fetched their water there. Based on John 4:15, these scholars have argued that Shechem is the Samaritan city of Sychar described in the Gospel of John.

Some of the inhabitants of Sychar were "Samaritans" who believed in Jesus when he tarried two days in the neighborhood (John 4). Sychar and/or Shechem city must have been visited by the Apostles on their way from Samaria to Jerusalem (Acts 8:25).

== See also ==
- Biblical archaeology
- Kingdom of Israel

== Sources ==
- Cornel Heinsdorff: "Christus, Nikodemus und die Samaritanerin am Jakobsbrunnen", Berlin/New York 2003, 218–220, ISBN 3-11-017851-6
- Stager, Lawrence (2003). "The Shechem Temple Where Abimelech Massacred a Thousand". Biblical Archaeology Review. 29:4 (July/August): 26–35, 66, 68–69.
