= Mount Ebal =

Mountain in the West Bank

Ebal
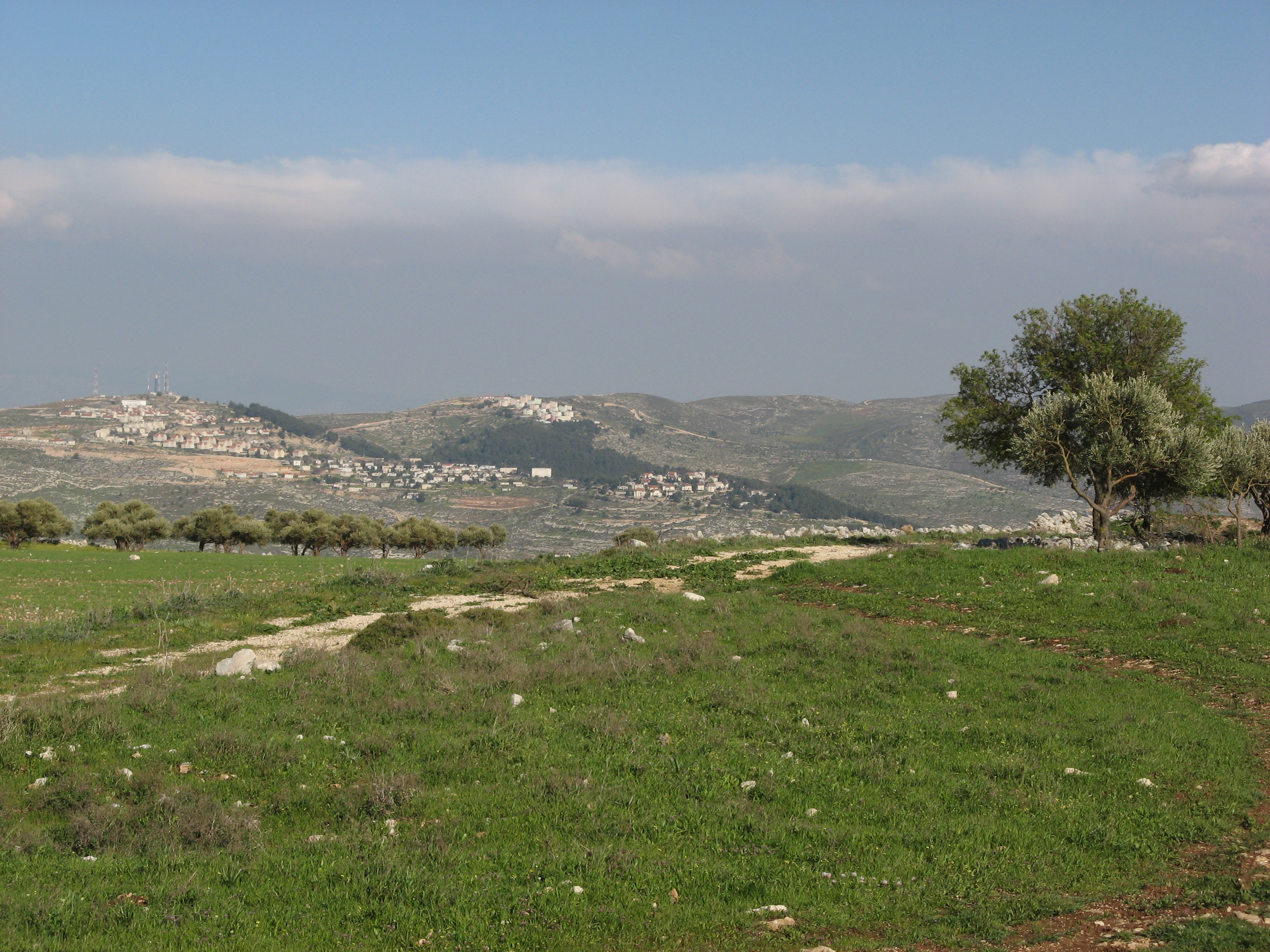
- View of Mount Ebal

Highest point
- Elevation: 935 m (3,068 ft)
- Coordinates: 32.234°N 35.2733°E

Geography
- Location within State of Palestine Location within the West Bank

Mount Ebal (Hebrew: הַר עֵיבָל, romanized: Har ʿĒḇāl; Arabic: جَبَل عَيْبال, romanized: Jabal ʿAybāl) is one of the two mountains near the city of Nablus (biblical Shechem) in the West Bank, and forms the northern side of the valley in which Nablus is situated, the southern side being formed by Mount Gerizim. The mountain is one of the highest peaks in the West Bank and rises to 935 m (3,068 ft) above sea level, some 60 m (200 ft) higher than Mount Gerizim. Mount Ebal is approximately 17 km^{2} (6.6 sq mi) in area, and is composed primarily of limestone. The slopes of the mountain contain several large caverns which were probably originally quarries, and at the base towards the north are several tombs.

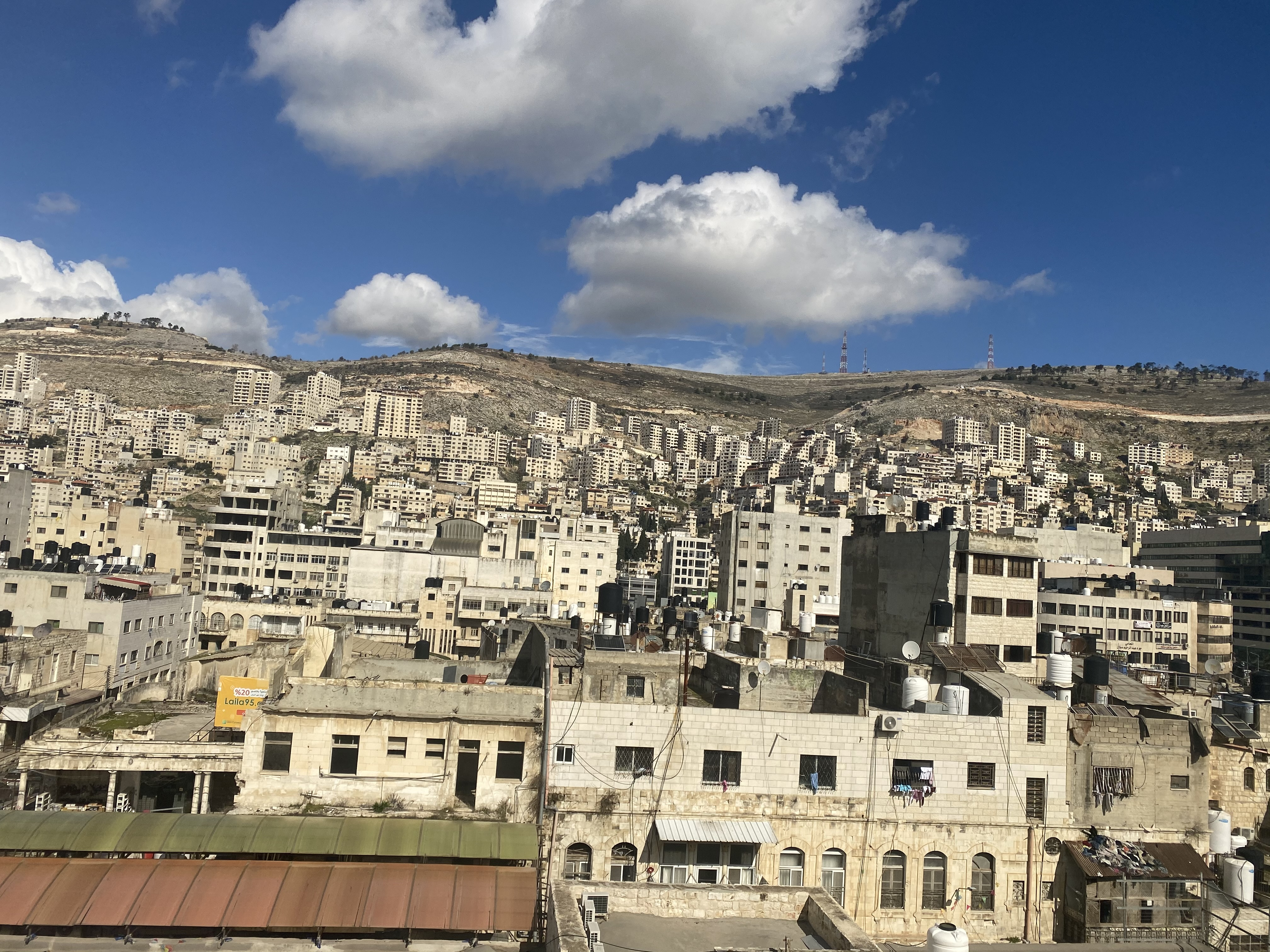
View of Mount Ebal from the city of Nablus

== Biblical account ==
In advance of the Israelites' entry to the Promised Land, Deuteronomy 11:29 records Moses' direction that "when the Lord your God has brought you into the land which you go to possess, that you shall put the blessing on Mount Gerizim and the curse on Mount Ebal".

In the Masoretic Text and the Septuagint version of Deuteronomy 27, an instruction is given to build an altar on Mount Ebal, constructed from natural (rather than cut) stones, to place stones there and whiten them with lime, to make peace offerings on the altar, eat there, and write the words of this law on the stone. According to the Samaritan Pentateuch and a Qumran fragment, this instruction actually concerns Mount Gerizim, which the Samaritans view as a holy site; some scholars believe that the Samaritan version is probably more accurate in this respect, the compilers of the masoretic text and authors of the Septuagint being likely to be biased against the Samaritans. Recent Dead Sea Scrolls work supports the accuracy of the Samaritan Pentateuch's designation of Mount Gerizim rather than Mount Ebal as the sacred site. A study published in 2018 asserts that the Mt. Gerizim reading is older than that referring to Mt. Ebal, which likely represents a later, polemical revision."

An instruction immediately subsequent to this orders that, once this is done, the Israelites should split into two groups, one to stay on Mount Ebal and pronounce curses, while the other goes to Mount Gerizim and pronounces blessings. The tribes of Simeon, Levi, Judah, Issachar, Joseph and Benjamin were to be sent to Gerizim, while those of Reuben, Gad, Asher, Zebulun, Dan and Naphtali, were to remain on Ebal. No attempts to explain this division of tribes either by their Biblical ethnology or by their geographical distribution have been generally accepted in academic circles.

The text goes on to list twelve curses, which were to be pronounced by the Levite priesthood and answered by the people with Amen. These curses heavily resemble laws (e.g. cursed be he who removes his neighbour's landmark), and they are not followed by a list of blessings described in a similarly liturgical framework; scholars believe that these more likely represent what was written on the stones, and that the later list of six explicit blessings, six near-corresponding explicit curses, were originally in this position in the text. The present position of these explicit blessings and curses, within a larger narrative of promise, and a far larger narrative of threat (respectively), is considered to have been an editorial decision for the post-exilic second version of Deuteronomy (Dtr2), to reflect the deuteronomist's worldview after the Babylonian exile had occurred.

In the Book of Joshua, after the Battle of Ai, Joshua built an altar of unhewn stones there, the Israelites then made peace offerings on it, the Law of Moses was written onto the stones, and the Israelites split into the two groups specified in Deuteronomy and pronounced blessings and cursings as instructed there. There is some debate between textual scholars as to whether this incident in Joshua is one account or spliced together two different accounts, where one account refers to Joshua building an altar, and making sacrifices on it, while the other account refers to Joshua placing large stone slabs there that had been whitened with lime and then had the Torah inscribed on them. Either way there is general agreement that the sources of Joshua predate Deuteronomy, and hence that the order to build the altar and make the inscription is likely based on these actions in the sources of Joshua, rather than the other way round, possibly to provide an aetiology for the site acceptable to the deuteronomist's theology.

Much later in the Book, when Joshua was old and dying, he gathered the people together at Shechem, and gave a farewell speech, and then wrote these words in the book of the Torah of God, and took a great stone, and set it under the doorpost which is in the sanctuary of the Lord. Depending on the way in which the sources of Joshua were spliced together, this may just be another version of the earlier narrative of Joshua placing the whitened stones slabs with the Torah inscribed on them, and some scholars believe that this narrative may have originally been in an earlier location within the Book of Joshua.

In the Biblical narrative, the terebinth, seemingly next to the sanctuary, was evidently in existence as early as the time of the Patriarchs, as Jacob is described in the Book of Genesis as having buried the idols of strange gods (belonging to his uncle Laban) beneath it. According to a midrash, one of these idols, in the shape of a dove, was later recovered by the Samaritans, and used in their worship on Mount Gerizim.

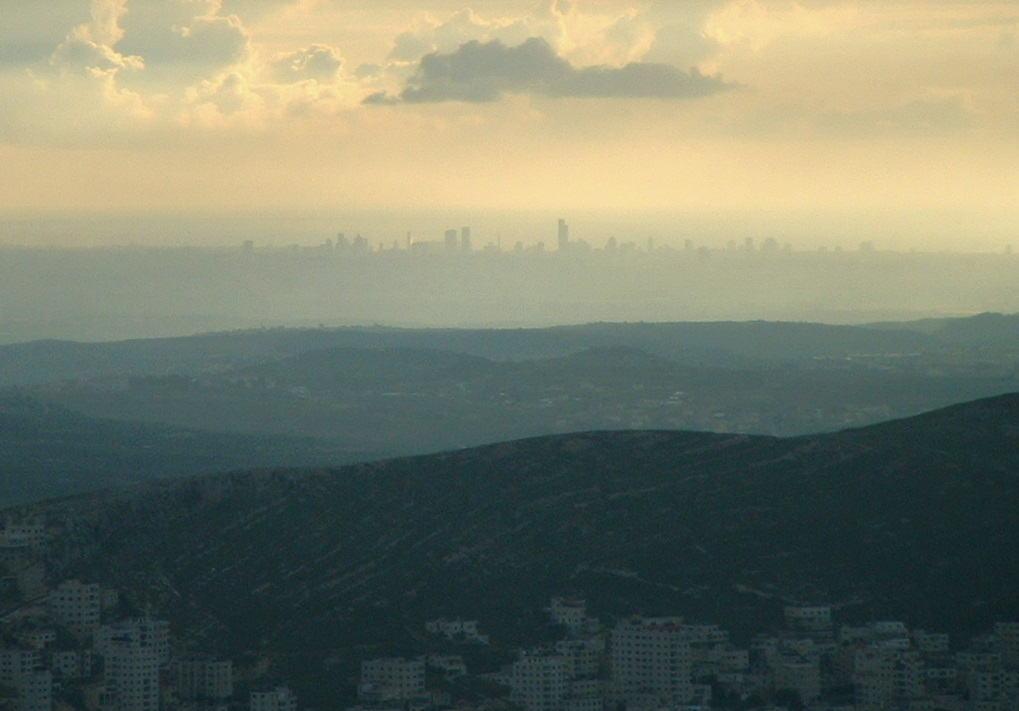
Tel Aviv, the Gush Dan metropolitan area and the Mediterranean Sea as seen from Mount Ebal

== Archaeology ==
=== Mount Ebal site (Northern el-Burnat) ===
In 1980, a structure on Mount Ebal was discovered by Israeli archaeologist Adam Zertal during the Manasseh Hill Country Survey. The University of Haifa and the Israel Exploration Society excavated the structure over eight seasons from 1982 to 1989, and uncovered scarabs, seals, and animal bones dating to the Iron Age I period. Today, most archeologists agree that the structure was a site of an early Israelite cultic activity. Zertal suggested that the structure was possibly the altar described in the Book of Joshua as where Joshua built an altar to Yahweh and renewed the Covenant in a large ceremony. This identification has been disputed by a number of archaeologists.

In February 2021 a portion of the site was destroyed by the Palestinian Authority and the stones were ground up and used to pave the road.

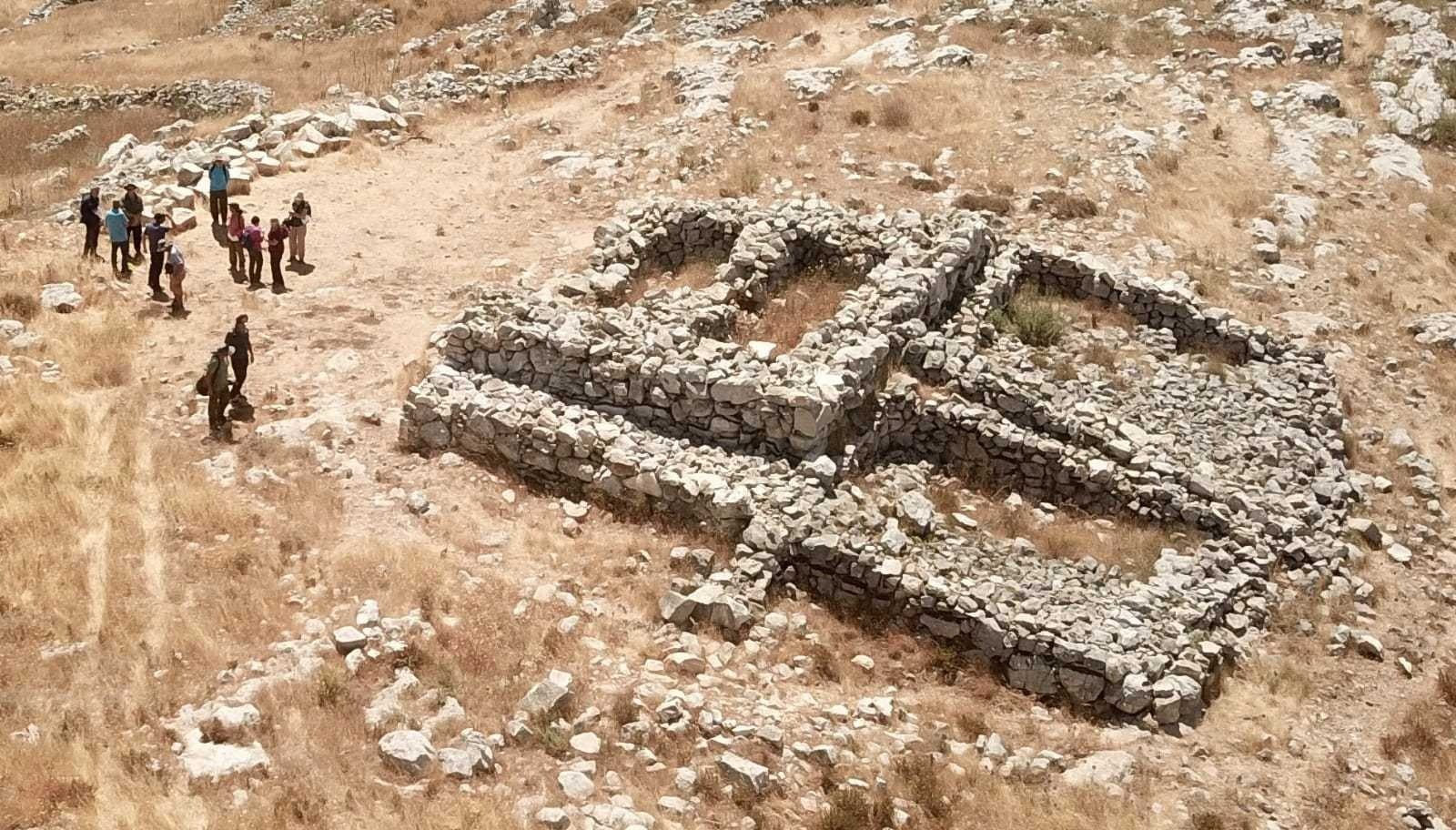
The structure on Mount Ebal

=== Western sites ===
The higher part of the mountain, on the west, contains the ruins of massive walls called Al-Kal'ah, and east of this, a site called Kunaisah.
