= Richard Johnson (16th-century writer) =

British romance writer (c. 1573 – c. 1659)

Richard Johnson (c. 1573 – c. 1659) was a British romance writer. All that is known of his biography is from internal evidence in his works: he was a London apprentice in the 1590s, and a freeman after 1600.

== Works ==
Johnson's most famous work is The Famous Historie of the Seaven Champions of Christendom (c. 1596). He added a second and a third part in 1608 and 1616.

His other stories include:

- Nine Worthies of London (1592);
- The Pleasant Walks of Moorefields (1607);
- The Pleasant Conceites of Old Hobson (1607), the hero being a well-known haberdasher in the Poultry;
- The Most Pleasant History of Tom a Lincolne (1607);
- A Remembrance of Robert Earle of Salisbury (1612);
- Looke on Me, London (1613);
- The History of Tom Thumbe (1621).

The Crown Garland of Golden Roses set forth in Many Pleasant new Songs and Sonnets (1612) was reprinted for the Percy Society in 1842 and 1845. It includes the earliest surviving printed version of the story of Dick Whittington and His Cat.
