= Joseph's Tomb =

Funerary monument in Nablus, West Bank

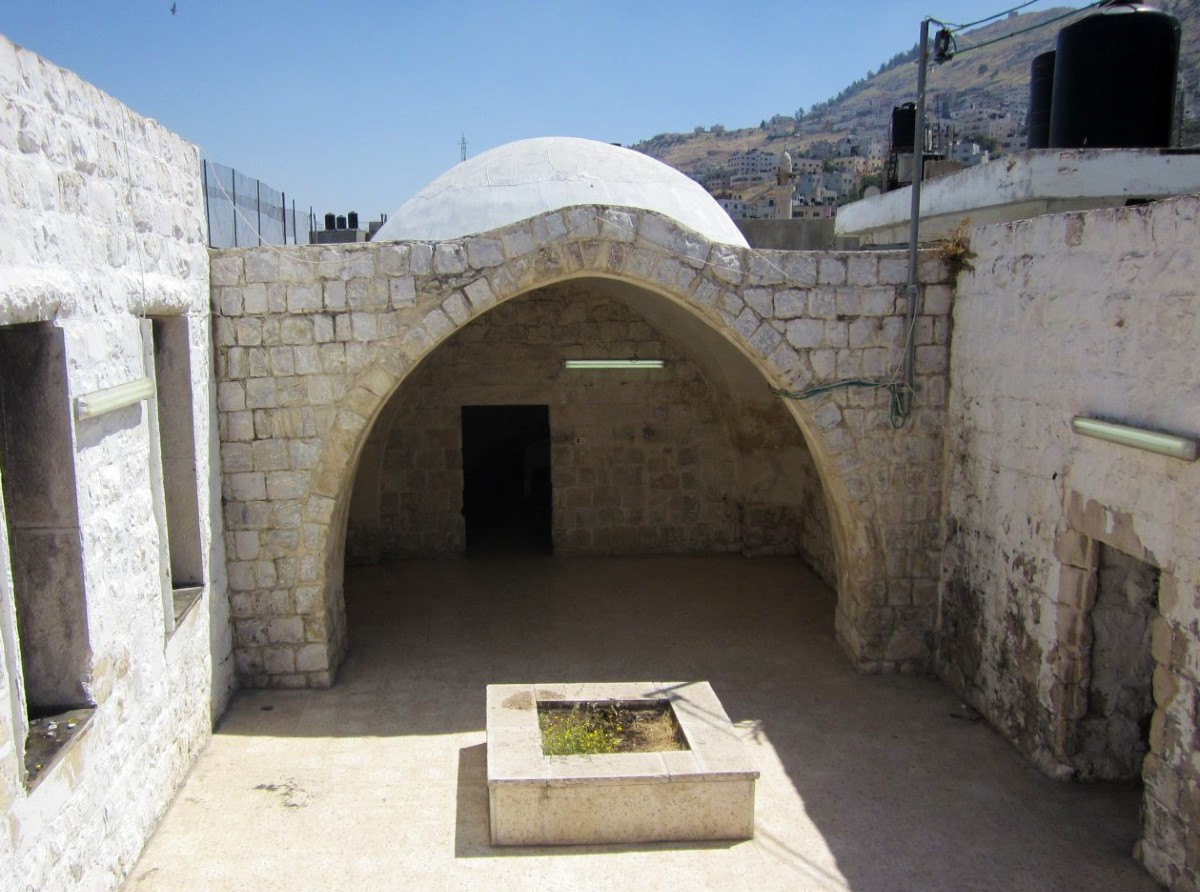
- Joseph's Tomb in Nablus

- Location within the West Bank
- 32.21328°N 35.28506°E
- Type: tomb
- Associated with: Joseph (son of Jacob) (?)
- Location: Nablus, West Bank

Site notes
- Material: local stone
- Condition: reconstructed
- Public access: limited

Joseph's Tomb (Hebrew: קבר יוסף, Qever Yosef; Arabic: قبر يوسف, Qabr Yūsuf) is a funerary monument located in Balata village at the eastern entrance to the valley that separates Mounts Gerizim and Ebal, 300 m (980 ft) northwest of Jacob's Well, on the outskirts of the West Bank city of Nablus. It has been venerated throughout the ages by Samaritans, for whom it is the second holiest site; by Jews; by Christians; and by Muslims, some of whom view it as the location of a local sheikh, Yusef al-Dwaik or Dawiqat, who died in the 18th century.

The site is near Tell Balata, the site of Shakmu in the Late Bronze Age and later biblical Shechem. One biblical tradition identifies the general area of Shechem as the resting-place of the biblical patriarch Joseph and his two sons Ephraim and Manasseh. Multiple locations over the years have been viewed as the legendary burial place of Joseph. Post-biblical records regarding the location of Joseph's Tomb somewhere around this area date from the beginning of the 4th century CE. The present structure, a small rectangular room with a cenotaph, is the result of an 1868 rebuilding action, and does not contain any architectural elements older than that. While some scholars, such as Kenneth Kitchen and James K. Hoffmeier, affirm the essential historicity of the biblical account of Joseph, others, such as Donald B. Redford, argue that the story itself has "no basis in fact".

There is no archaeological evidence establishing the tomb as Joseph's, and modern scholarship has yet to determine whether or not the present cenotaph is to be identified with the ancient biblical gravesite. The lack of Jewish or Christian sources prior to the 5th century that mention the tomb indicates that prior to the 4th century it was a Samaritan site. Samaritan sources tell of struggles between Samaritans and Christians who wished to remove Joseph's bones.

At key points in its long history, a site thought to be Joseph's Tomb in this area witnessed intense sectarian conflict. Samaritans and Christians disputing access and title to the site in the early Byzantine period often engaged in violent clashes. After Israel captured the West Bank in 1967, Palestinians were prohibited from worship at the shrine and it was gradually turned into a Jewish prayer room. Interreligious friction and conflict from competing Jewish and Muslim claims over the tomb became frequent. Though it fell under the jurisdiction of the Palestinian National Authority (PNA) following the signing of the Oslo Accords, it remained under IDF guard with Muslims prohibited from praying there. At the beginning of the Al-Aqsa Intifada in 2000, just after being handed over to the PNA, it was looted and razed by rioting Palestinians. Following the reoccupation of Nablus during Israel's Operation Defensive Shield in 2002, Jewish groups returned there intermittently. Between 2009 and 2010 the structure was refurbished, with a new cupola installed, and visits by Jewish worshippers resumed. Palestinian Authority police killed an Israeli worshipper at the tomb in 2011. The tomb was vandalized by Palestinian rioters in 2015 and again in 2022.

== Early traditions ==
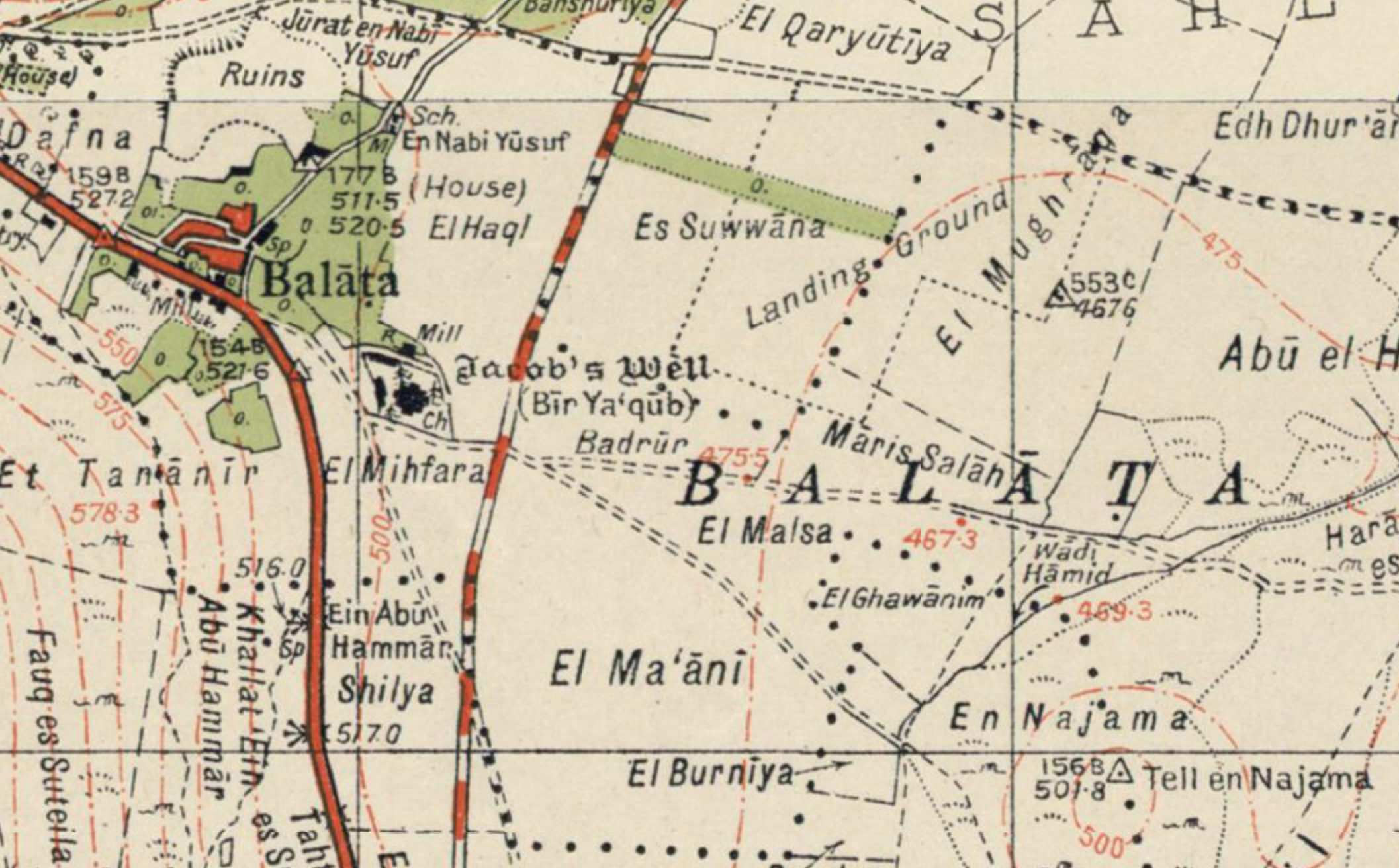
Joseph's Tomb (labelled En Nabi Yusuf) in a 1940s Survey of Palestine map of Balata village. The map also shows Jacob's Well (Bir Ya'qub) and Tell Balata (labelled "Ruins")

=== Biblical source and early religious traditions ===
The Torah provides four details regarding the traditions surrounding Joseph's remains. The account in Genesis relates that, before his death, he had his brothers swear they would carry his bones out of Egypt to Canaan. He is then said to have been embalmed and placed in a coffin in Egypt. In Exodus, we are told that Moses fulfilled the pledge by taking Joseph's bones with him when he left Egypt. In Joshua, Joseph's bones are said to have been brought from Egypt by the Children of Israel and interred in Shechem.

The bones of Joseph, which the Children of Israel brought up out of Egypt, were buried in Shechem in a parcel of land Jacob bought from the sons of Hamor, father of Shechem, for a hundred pieces of silver (qeśîṭâ). Joshua 24:32.

The Bible does not identify a specific site in Shechem where his bones were laid to rest. The Genesis Rabba, a Jewish text written c. 400–450 CE, states that a burial site in Shechem is one of three for which the nations of the world cannot ridicule Israel and say "you have stolen them," it having been purchased by Jacob. The rabbis also suggest that Joseph instructed his brothers to bury him in Shechem since it was from there he was taken and sold into slavery. Other Jewish sources have him buried either in Safed, or, according to an aggadic tradition, have him interred at Hebron according to his own wishes. The ambiguity is reflected in Islamic tradition which points to Nablus as being the authentic site, though some early Islamic geographers identified the Cave of the Patriarchs in Hebron as housing his tomb. The Qur'an itself does not mention details of Joseph's burial. Ali of Herat (1119), Yaqut (1229) and Ibn Battuta (1369) all conserve both the Nablus and Hebron traditions. Later Muslim chroniclers also mention a third site purporting to be the authentic tomb, near Beit Ijza. The Hebron tradition is also reflected in some medieval Christian sources, such as the account by Srewulf (CE 1102) who says that "the bones of Joseph were buried more humbly than the rest, as it were at the extremity of the castle".

=== Modern scholarship on the narrative of Joseph's bones ===
Though the traditional biblical date for the narrative of Joseph's life and death places him in Egypt in the middle of the Twelfth Dynasty, roughly contemporaneous to the Hyksos invasion of Egypt, contemporary scholarship no longer accepts such a remote dating. The figure of Joseph itself is often taken to be a "personification of a tribe", rather than an historic person.

According to the Bible, Joseph was embalmed and buried in a coffin in Egypt, after having his people swear to carry his bones away. Later midrash identify his first entombment in a royal mausoleum, or as cast into the Nile. Moses is said to have gathered the bones and taken them with him during the Exodus from Egypt, using magic to raise the coffin, a tradition repeated by Josephus, who specifies that they were buried in Canaan at that time. Regarding his burial in Canaan, from Joshua it is evident that the portion Joseph received was an allotment near Shechem, not the town itself.

The majority of contemporary scholars believe the historicity of the events in the Joseph story cannot be demonstrated. In the wake of scholars like Hermann Gunkel, Hugo Gressmann and Gerhard von Rad, who identified the story of Joseph as primarily a literary composition, it is now widely considered to belong to the genre of romance, or the novella. As a novella it is read as reworking legends and myths, many of them, especially the motifs of his reburial in Canaan, associated with the Egyptian god Osiris, though some compare the burial of his bones at Shechem with the disposal of Dionysus's bones at Delphi. The reworked legends and folklore were probably inserted into the developing textual tradition of the Bible between the 8th and 6th centuries BCE. Most scholars place its composition in a genre that flourished in the Persian period of the Exile.

For Schenke, the tradition of Joseph's burial at Shechem can only be understood as a secondary, Israelitic historical interpretation woven around a more ancient Canaanite shrine in that area. Wright has indeed argued that "the patriarch Joseph was not an Israelite hero who became Egyptianised, but an Egyptian divinity who was Hebraised."

=== Schenke's hypothesis ===
Hans-Martin Schenke, starting from an analysis of John 4:4–6, in which Jesus encounters a Samaritan woman at the town of Sychar, made an extensive analysis of the ancient sources, together with an examination of the site. The curiosity of the Gospel text for scholars lies in the mention of an otherwise unattested town in the field, and the failure of the text to refer to Joseph's Tomb, despite mentioning the field Jacob allotted to Joseph, and Jacob's Well. In Schenke's view, from the beginning of the Hellenistic period down to the 1st century CE, when the author of John's gospel was presumably writing, the grave commemorating Joseph stood by Jacob's Well. This grave was shifted, together with the sacred tree and Jacob's field, sometime between that date and the earliest testimony we have in the Bordeaux itinerary in 333 CE, which locates it elsewhere, by Shechem/Tel Balāṭa.

== History of the identification and use of the site ==
=== Pilgrim accounts ===
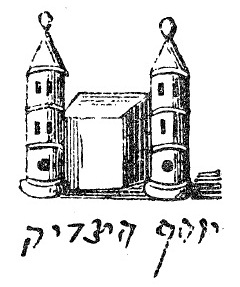
Drawing from the itinerary of Rabbi Uri of Biel, c. 1564. (Annotation: "Joseph the Righteous")

The Itinerarium Burdigalense (333 CE) notes: "At the foot of the mountain itself, is a place called Sichem. Here is a tomb in which Joseph is laid, in the parcel of ground which Jacob his father gave to him." Eusebius of Caesarea in the 4th-century records in his Onomasticon: "Suchem, city of Jacob now deserted. The place is pointed out in the suburb of Neapolis. There the tomb of Joseph is pointed out nearby." Jerome, writing of Saint Paula's sojourn in Palestine writes that "turning off the way [from Jacob's well], she saw the tombs of the twelve patriarchs". Jerome himself, together with the Byzantine monk George Syncellus, who had lived many years in Palestine, wrote that all twelve patriarchs, Joseph included, were buried at Sychem.

Both Theodosius I and Theodosius II ordered a search for Joseph's bones, much to the dismay of the Samaritan community. An imperial commission was dispatched to retrieve the bones of the Patriarchs around 415, and on failing to obtain them at Hebron, sought to at least secure Joseph's bones from Shechem. No gravestone marked the exact site, possibly because the Samaritans had removed one to avoid Christian interference. The officials had to excavate the general area where graves abound and, on finding an intact marble sepulchre beneath an empty coffin, concluded that it must contain Joseph's bones. They sent the sarcophagus to Byzantium, where it was incorporated into Hagia Sophia. Jerome reports that apparently the Christians had intended to remove Joseph's bones to their city, but a column of fire rose skyward from the tomb scaring them away. The Samaritans subsequently covered the tomb with earth, rendering it inaccessible.

Christian pilgrim and archdeacon Theodosius (518–520) in his De situ terrae sanctae mentions that "close to Jacob's Well are the remains of Joseph the Holy". The Madaba Mosaic Map (6th century) designates a site somewhat problematically with the legend – "Joseph's" (τὸ τοῦ Ὶωσήφ) – where the usual adjective 'holy' (hagios) accompanying mentions of saints and their shrines is lacking.

Crusader and medieval sources generally are, according to Hans-Martin Schenke, highly misleading regarding exactly where the tomb was situated. He concluded that in the Middle Ages, as earlier, various groups (Jews, Samaritans, Christians and Muslims) at different periods identified different things in different places all as Joseph's tomb. Sometimes Balata, with its spring, seems indicated, as in the following two examples, which identify the tomb not as a structure, but as something by a spring and under a tree. It was evidently a site for Muslim pilgrimage at that time.

In 1173 the Persian traveler al-Harawi paid homage at the tomb, and wrote:

There is also near Nâblus the spring of Al Khudr (Elias), and the field of Yûsuf as Sadik (Joseph); further, Joseph is buried at the foot of the tree at this place.

Around the year 1225, Yaqut al-Hamawi wrote:

There is here a spring called ‘Ain al Khudr. Yûsuf (Joseph) as Sadik – peace be on him! – was buried here, and his tomb is well known, lying under the tree.

as did Benjamin of Tudela—who wrote that the Samaritans in Nablus were in possession of it. William of Malmesbury describes it as overlaid with white marble, next to the mausolea of his brothers. Menachem ben Peretz of Hebron (1215) writes that in Shechem he saw the tomb of Joseph son of Jacob with two marble pillars next to it—one at its head and another at its foot—and a low stone wall surrounding it. Ishtori Haparchi (1322) places the tombstone of Joseph 450 meters north of Balāta, while Alexander de Ariosti (1463) and Francesco Suriano (1485) associate it with the church over Jacob's well. Samuel bar Simson (1210), Jacob of Paris (1258), and Johannes Poloner (1422) locate it by Nablus. Gabriel Muffel of Nuremberg discerns a tomb to Joseph in a monument to the west of Nablus, halfway between that city and Sebaste. Mandeville (1322) and Maundrell (1697), among others, also mention its existence, although it is debatable as to whether any of these reports refer to the currently recognised location. Samuel ben Samson (1210) appears to place the tomb at Shiloh. Mandeville (1322) locates it 'nigh beside' Nablus as does Maundrell (1697), but the indications are vague. Maundrell describes his sepulchre as located in a small mosque just by Nablus, which does not fit the present location.

Although the Koran does not mention details of Joseph's burial, Islamic tradition points to Nablus as being the authentic site. However, some early Islamic geographers identified the Cave of the Patriarchs in Hebron as housing his tomb. While Ali of Herat (1119), Yaqut (1229) and Ibn Battuta (1369) all report the Hebron traditions, they also mention the existence of a tomb of Joseph at Nablus. Later Muslim chroniclers even mention a third site purporting to be the authentic tomb, near Beit Ijza.

=== 19th-century accounts ===
William Cooke Taylor (1838) describes the biblical parcel of ground Jacob gave to Joseph as situated on plain of Mukhna, and identifies the tomb as an oriental weli structure at the entrance to the valley of Nablus, to the right near the base of Mt Ebal. The sarcophagus, he suggests, lies underneath or somewhere else in the vicinity of this plain, and comments:

The present monument ... is a place of resort, not only for Jews and Christians, but Mohammedans and Samaritans; all of whom concur in the belief that it stands on the vertiable spot where the patriarch was buried.

In 1839, the Jewish traveller Loewe based his identification of the tomb as near Jacob's Well by a topographical argument. Scripture, he argued, calls the place neither an emek (valley) nor a shephelah (plain), but a 'portion of field' (chelkat hasadeh), and concluded: "in the whole of Palestine there is not such another plot to be found, a dead level, without the least hollow or swelling in a circuit of two hours." In 1839, it was recorded that Jews frequently visited the tomb and that many inscriptions in Hebrew were visible on the walls. The site was "kept very neat and in good repair by the bounty of Jews who visited it".

Hebrew inscription recording the repairs of 1749: "With the good sign. The LORD endureth forever. My help cometh from the LORD who made heaven and earth. Joseph is a fruitful bough. Behold a renewed majestic building ... Blessed be the LORD who has put it into the heart of Elijah, the son of Meir, our rabbi, to build again the house of Joseph in the month Sivan, in the year 5509" (AM)

John Wilson (1847) writes that the tomb lies about two or three hundred yards to the north of Jacob's Well, across the valley. He describes it as "a small solid erection in the form of a wagon roof, over what is supposed to be the patriarch's grave, with a small pillar or altar at each of its extremities, sometimes called the tombs of Ephraim and Manasseh, and the middle of an enclosure without a covering. Many visitors names, in the Hebrew and Samaritan characters, are written on the walls of this enclosure." One of the inscriptions is said to intimate the tomb's repair by a Jew from Egypt, Elijah son of Meir, around 1749. Wilson adds that "The Jews of Nablus take upon themselves the duty of keeping the tomb in order. They applied to us for a subscription to aid in making some repairs and we complied with their request". These Hebrew and Samaritan inscriptions were still visible on the white plastered walls as late as 1980, as were small lamps in an internal recess, probably donated by Jews during the 18th and 19th centuries.

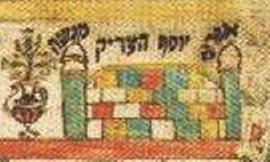
Jewish illustration depicting the tomb (19th-century)

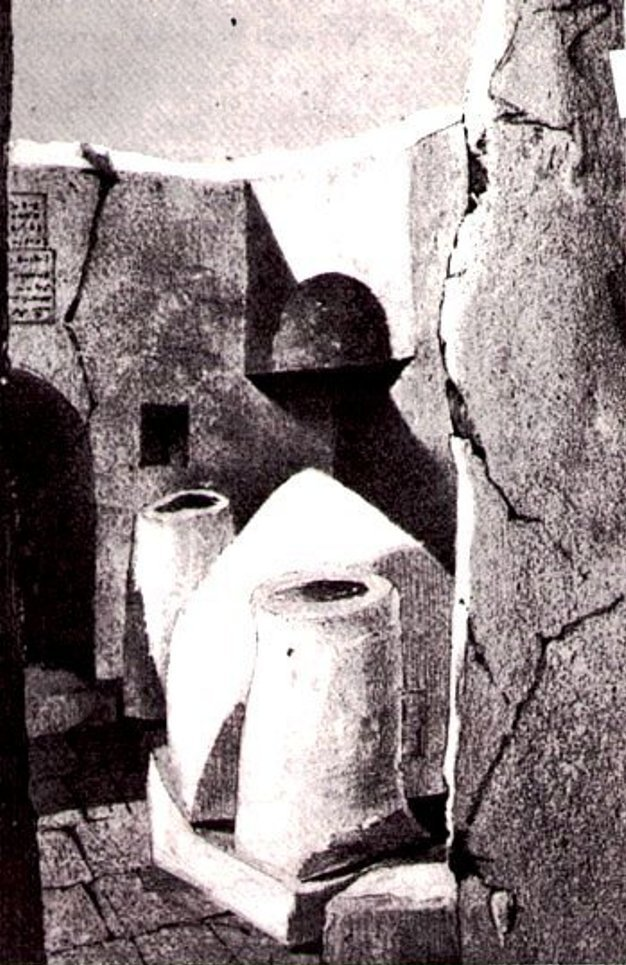
Photograph, 1868

Rabbi Joseph Schwarz (1850) who had lived in Palestine for 16 years, identified the village of Abulnita, "about 2 English miles east of Shechem", as the site "where Joseph lies buried". Western travellers to Palestine in the 19th century described their impressions of the site in travelogues. John Ross Browne (1853) writes: "We also visited the reputed site of Joseph's Tomb. A rude stone building covers the pretended sepulcher; but the best authorities deny that there was any evidence that Joseph was buried here." Howard Crosby also visited the site during 1851. He designated it, "the so-called tomb of Joseph", describing it as "a plain white Santon's tomb, or Wely, such as is everywhere seen in Mohammedan countries, excepting that this one is roofless, and consequently lacks the usual white dome. In the interior, a vine grows from a corner, and spreads upon a trellis over the tomb, forming a pleasant bower." Louis Félicien Joseph Caignart de Saulcy and Edouard de Warren (1853) describe it as "a small Mussulman oually (weli, i.e. chapel) ... said to be the tomb of Joseph", noting it was just to the east of what the Arabs called Bir-Yakub, Jacob's Well. Hackett noted in 1857 that the tomb is placed diagonally to the walls, instead of parallel, and found "the walls of the interior covered with the names of pilgrims, representing almost every land and language; though the Hebrew character was the most prominent one". Thomson noted in 1883 that "the entire building is fast crumbling to ruin, presenting a most melancholy spectacle". Being exposed to the weather, "it has no pall or votive offering of any kind, nor any marks of respect such as are seen at the sepulchres of the most insignificant Muslim saints." During the late 19th century, sources report the Jewish custom of burning small articles such as gold lace, shawls or handkerchiefs, in the two low pillars at either end of the tomb. This was done in "memory of the patriarch who sleeps beneath".

==== Detailed survey by Conder, 1878–89 ====
A stone bench is built into the east wall, on which three Jews were seated at the time of our second visit, book in hand, swinging backwards and forwards as they crooned out a nasal chant–a prayer no doubt appropriate to the place.

— Claude R. Conder, 1878.

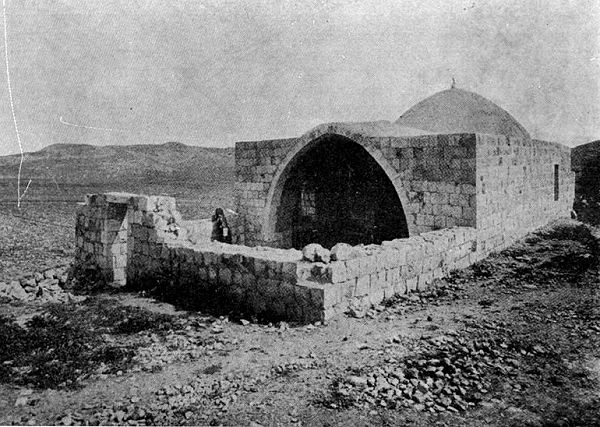
Early 1900s

Claude R. Conder provides a detailed description of the site in his works Tent Work in Palestine (1878), Survey of Western Palestine (1881) and Palestine (1889).

===== The enclosure =====
It is located on the road-side from Balata to ‘Askar, at the end of a row of fine fig trees. The open courtyard surrounding the tomb measures about 18 foot (5.5 m) square. The plastered, whitewashed walls, about 1 foot (0.30 m) thick, are in good repair and stand 10 foot (3.0 m) high. Entrance to the courtyard is from the north through the ruin of a little square domed building. There are two Hebrew inscriptions on the south wall. An additional English inscription notes that the structure was entirely rebuilt at the expense of the English consul at Damascus by early 1868.

The tomb itself measures 6 foot (1.8 m) long and stands 4 foot (1.2 m) high. It consisted of a long narrow plastered block with an arched roof, having a pointed cross section. The tomb is not in line with the walls of the courtyard, which have a bearing of 202°, nor is it in the middle of the enclosure, being nearest to the west wall. Two short plastered pedestals with shallow cup-shaped hollows at their tops stand at the head and foot of the tomb. The hollows are blackened by fire due to the Jewish custom of burning offerings of shawls, silks or gold lace on the pillar altars. Both Jews and Samaritans burn oil lamps and incense in the pillar cavity.

Conder also questions the fact that the tomb points north to south, inconsistent with Muslim tombs north of Mecca. This fact did not however diminish Muslim veneration of the shrine:

The tomb points approximately north and south, thus being at right angles to the direction of Moslem tombs north of Mecca. How the Mohammedans explain this disregard of orientation in so respected a Prophet as "our Lord Joseph", I have never heard; perhaps the rule is held to be only established since the time of Mohammed. The veneration in which the shrine is held by the Moslem peasantry is, at all events, not diminished by this fact.

=== Competing dedications, alternative shrines ===
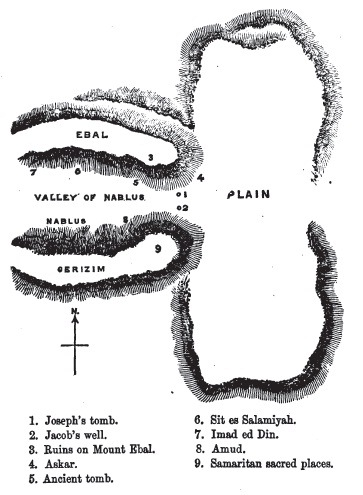
1864 plan of Nablus showing Joseph's Tomb (1), Ancient tomb (5), Imad ed Din (7) and Amud (8)

In the course of pin-pointing the location of the tomb, the Reverend H.B. Hackett in Sir William Smith's A dictionary of the Bible (1863) mentions the existence of two tombs bearing an association to Joseph in Nablus. In addition to the one close to the well, (location of Conder's survey), he describes another exclusively Muslim tomb in the vicinity, about a quarter of a mile up the valley on the slope of Mt. Gerizim. He is not able to conclude which of the tombs is that of the biblical Joseph, but cites Arthur Penrhyn Stanley (1856) that at the Muslim tomb "a later Joseph is also commemorated at the sanctuary." Stanley himself writes that the little mosque on Gerizim's north-eastern slopes is known by various names including Allon Moreh (Oak of Moreh), Aron Moreh (Ark of Moreh) and Sheykh al-Amad (شيخ العَمَد shaykh al-‘amad, "Saint of the Pillar") which he suggests commemorate biblical traditions. Stanley also quotes Buckingham, who mentions that the Samaritans maintain that the alternative tomb belongs to a certain Rabbi Joseph of Nablus. John Mills (1864) writes that claims of the tomb belonging to Rabbi Joseph of Nablus are unfounded, the structure being called by the Samaritans "The Pillar" in commemoration of the pillar set up by Joshua. Mills rather identifies the supposed rabbi's tomb with a mosque named after a Muslim saint, Sheikh el-Amud ("Saint of the Pillar"), but further claims that the association is "only a modern invention of the Mohammedans". A book published in 1894, also questions the existence of a tomb to Rabbi Joseph of Nablus, calling it "a Mohammedan legend, imposed upon inquisitive travellers by unscrupulous guides" since "the present Samaritans known of no Joseph's tomb but the generally accepted one".

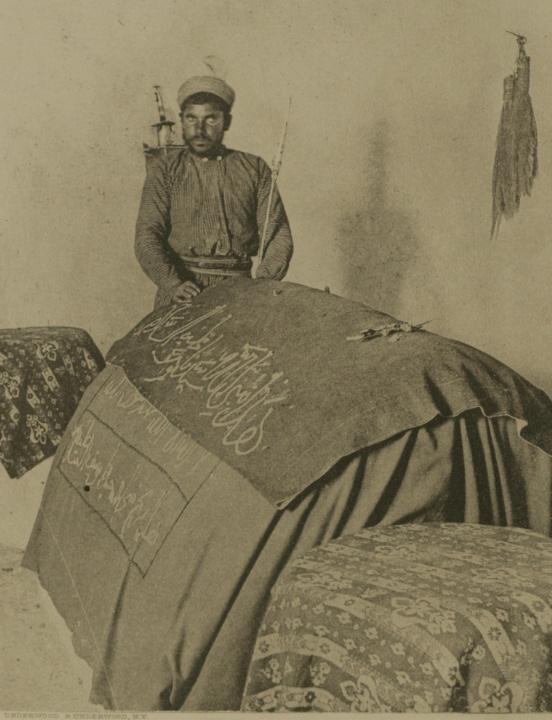
"This is God's prophet, our master Joseph, peace be upon him", 1917. The text is stated on the top part with large letter in Arabic: "Hadhā nabiyy-’Allah sayyidinā Yūsuf ʿalayhi ’s-salām" (هٰذا نَبِيّ الله سَيِّدِنَا يُوسُف عَلَيهِ ٱلْسَّلَام)

By the 1860s, many Jews and Muslims had come to see the limestone structure as housing the tomb of the biblical Joseph, and it was referred to in Arabic as "Qabr en-Nabi Yūsuf" ("Tomb of the Prophet Joseph"). A decorative cloth photographed in 1917, draped over the tomb itself, asserted this perception. Palestinians are also said to regard the site as the burial place of Yūsuf Dawiqat, an 18th-century Islamic sheikh. It has been claimed that this tradition is an innovation in response to Israeli control of the site since the 1970s.

=== 1967–2000 ===
Before 1967, the tomb was still located in a field in the village of Balata on the outskirts of Nablus. Local residents apparently believed the structure entombed a 19th-century cleric who was reputed to have healed the sick by reciting Koranic verses. Although the building did not function as a mosque, it was used by childless couples who would pray there for children, and young boys would take their first ritual haircut inside. After the capture of Nablus and the rest of the Palestinian territories in the 1967 Six-Day War, Jewish settlers began to frequent the site, and by 1975, Muslims were prohibited from visiting the site. After a settler was stabbed in Nablus in 1983, other settlers demonstrated by taking over Joseph's tomb for three days in a bid to force the government's hand into using an iron fist. In the mid-1980s a yeshiva named Od Yosef Chai, (Joseph Still Lives), affiliated with some of the more militant Jewish settlements, and headed by Yitzhak Ginsburg, was built at the site beside an Israel Defense Forces (IDF) military outpost, apparently on the model of settler success in establishing a presence at the Tomb of the Patriarchs in Hebron. All Muslims including those living nearby were forcefully denied access. An initial attempt in 1994 to transform the site into a Jewish religious centre failed. Shulamit Aloni, minister for culture and education in the Rabin government, outraged religious activists at the time by asserting, on the basis of archeological evidence, that the site was only 200 years old, and the tomb that of Sheikh Yūsuf (Dawiqat), a Sufi holy man who died in the 18th century. Her views were challenged by Benny Katzover who replied that she had been misled by archeologists, and he had experts to back the traditional ascription. In 1997 Torah scrolls were brought in, the prayer niche facing Mecca was covered, and the site was declared a synagogue and yeshiva. Attaching the religious tradition surrounding the story of Joseph to the site, the settlers received protection from the IDF to transform this place of Muslim worship into one of their own. A curfew lasting 24 hours was once imposed by the IDF on Nablus's 120,000 inhabitants to allow a group of settlers and 2 Likud Knesset members to pray at the site. The site, which Jewish worshippers make monthly pilgrimages to, is among the most important to Orthodox Jews.

On December 12, 1995, in accordance with the Oslo Accords, jurisdiction of Nablus was handed over to the Palestinian National Authority, though Israel retained control of several religious sites, one of which was Joseph's Tomb, thus sanctioning the fraught situation. Settler apprehensions that the area might be returned to Palestinians worked to enhance the status of Joseph's tomb as a centre of pilgrimage. The Interim Agreement stipulated that: "Both sides shall respect and protect the religious rights of Jews, Christians, Muslims and Samaritans concerning the protection and free access to the holy sites as well as freedom of worship and practice." The tomb, resembling a fortified military post with a small functioning yeshiva, became a frequent flash point. On September 24, 1996, after the opening of an exit for the Hasmonean Tunnel under the Ummariya madrasah, which Palestinians interpreted as a signal Benjamin Netanyahu was sending that Israel was to be the sole sovereign of Jerusalem, the PNA called for a general strike and a wave of protests broke out throughout the West Bank. In clashes, 80 people were killed and 253 wounded in the West Bank while six Israeli soldiers were killed at the tomb, and parts of the adjacent yeshiva were ransacked. Jews continued to worship at the site under limited protection of the Israel Defense Forces (IDF), often dressed as civilians easily mistaken for settlers. The site had been attacked by gun fire, and hundreds of Palestinians stormed the compound. Israeli border control took control over the compound but Palestinian security services requested to take control over the positions and the control was passed to them. in the following hours the mob put cars outside the compound ablaze entered the tomb and removed the Morus tree, the last known image of the Morus tree was taken during 2006.

Over the year and a half between 1999 and 2000, the IDF, seconded by the Shin Bet and the Israeli Border Police, had asked the government to evacuate the tomb. In September 2000, in the wake of Ariel Sharon's controversial visit to the Temple Mount, the Al-Aqsa Intifada broke out, and Nablus turned into conflict zone, in part after its governor's son was shot dead during a clash with Israeli soldiers. The Palestinians targeted the site, reportedly on the grounds that it was better for the shrine to belong to no one than to be appropriated by just one religion, burning the yeshiva to the ground, incinerating its books and painting the dome green, an act which led to retaliation with Jewish vandalism of three mosques in Tiberias and Jaffa. After the death of an Israeli border policeman the head of the IDF's southern command, Brigadier-General Yom-Tov Samia, threatened to resign if the government kept control of the tomb, since retaining control of it was "patently illegal". Prime Minister Ehud Barak eventually complied with the request and the site was handed over to the Palestinian police on October 7, 2000. Israeli newspapers framed the return of the site as a humiliating defeat for the nation. The tomb was pillaged and torched by Palestinian protesters hours after its evacuation. The next morning, the bullet-riddled body of rabbi Hillel Lieberman of Elon Moreh, a cousin of Senator Joseph Lieberman, was found on the outskirts of Nablus, where he had gone to check damage to the tomb. Joseph's Tomb embodied a key Zionist theme: the return from exile to one's homeland, and the Palestinian assault has been interpreted as challenging the credibility of claims to the site. The PA began to repair it the next day. Palestinian spokesperson Hanan Ashrawi claimed that Judaism's connection with the tomb was "fabricated". The mayor of Nablus Ghassan Shakaa was reported as saying Jewish worshippers would not be permitted to pray there until an international organization or third party determines whether the site is holy to Muslims or Jews.

Israeli military officials said the Palestinians intended to build a mosque on the ruins of the site. The statement came after workers repairing the tomb painted the site's dome green, the colour of Islam. A Palestinian Authority spokesman denied the allegations and said that Arafat had ordered the renovations and for the synagogue to be rebuilt. Ghassan Shakaa, the mayor, claimed that city officials simply wanted to return the building to the way it looked before it came into Israeli hands in the 1967 Mideast war. Under intense U.S. and international pressure the dome was repainted white.

=== Since 2000 ===
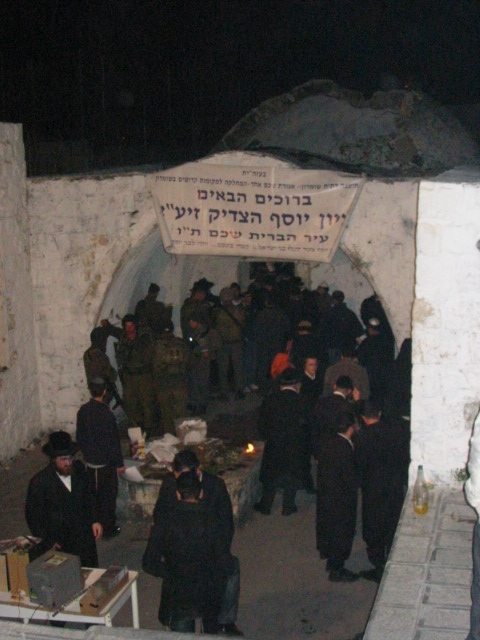
Night visit under IDF guard, November 2009

After the events of October 2000, the IDF prohibited Israeli access to the tomb. As a result of Operation Defensive Shield, Nablus was reoccupied by the IDF in April 2002, with severe damage to the historic core of the city, where 64 heritage buildings suffered serious damage or were destroyed. Some Breslov hasidim and others began to take advantage of the new circumstances to visit the site clandestinely under the cover of darkness, evading army and police checkpoints. Eventually Joseph's tomb was once more open to visits. In May 2002, Israeli soldiers mistakenly opened fire on a convoy of settlers taking advantage of an ongoing incursion in Nablus to visit the tomb. Seven settlers were arrested by the army for illegally entering a combat zone. As a result of Operation Defensive Shield, the tomb was retaken by the IDF and shortly afterwards, in response to numerous requests, they renewed guarded tours of the tomb. One day every month at midnight as many as 800 visitors were allowed to pray at the gravesite. These visits were designed to prevent unauthorized and unprotected clandestine visits, mainly by Breslav Hasidim. However, in October, citing security reasons, Israel re-imposed a ban on Jewish pilgrims obtaining special permits and travelling to the tomb.

In February 2003 it was reported in the Jerusalem Post that the grave had been pounded with hammers and that the tree at its entrance had been broken; car parts and trash littered the tomb which had a "huge hole in its dome". Bratslav leader Aaron Klieger notified and lobbied government ministers about the desecration, but the IDF said it had no plans to secure or guard the site, claiming such action would be too costly.

In February 2007, thirty five Knesset members (MKs) wrote to the army asking them to open Joseph's Tomb to Jewish visitors for prayer. In May 2007, Breslov Hasidim visited the site for the first time in two years and later on that year, a group of Hasidim found that the gravesite had been cleaned up by the Palestinians. In the past few years the site had suffered from neglect and its appearance had deteriorated, with garbage being dumped and tires being burned there.

In early 2008, a group of MKs wrote a letter to the Prime Minister asking that the tomb be renovated: "The tombstone is completely shattered, and the holy site is desecrated in an appalling manner, the likes of which we have not seen in Israel or anywhere else in the world." In February, it was reported that Israel would officially ask the Palestinian Authority to carry out repairs at the tomb, but in response, vandals set tires on fire inside the tomb. In December 2008, Jewish workers funded by anonymous donors painted the blackened walls and re-built the shattered stone marker covering the grave.

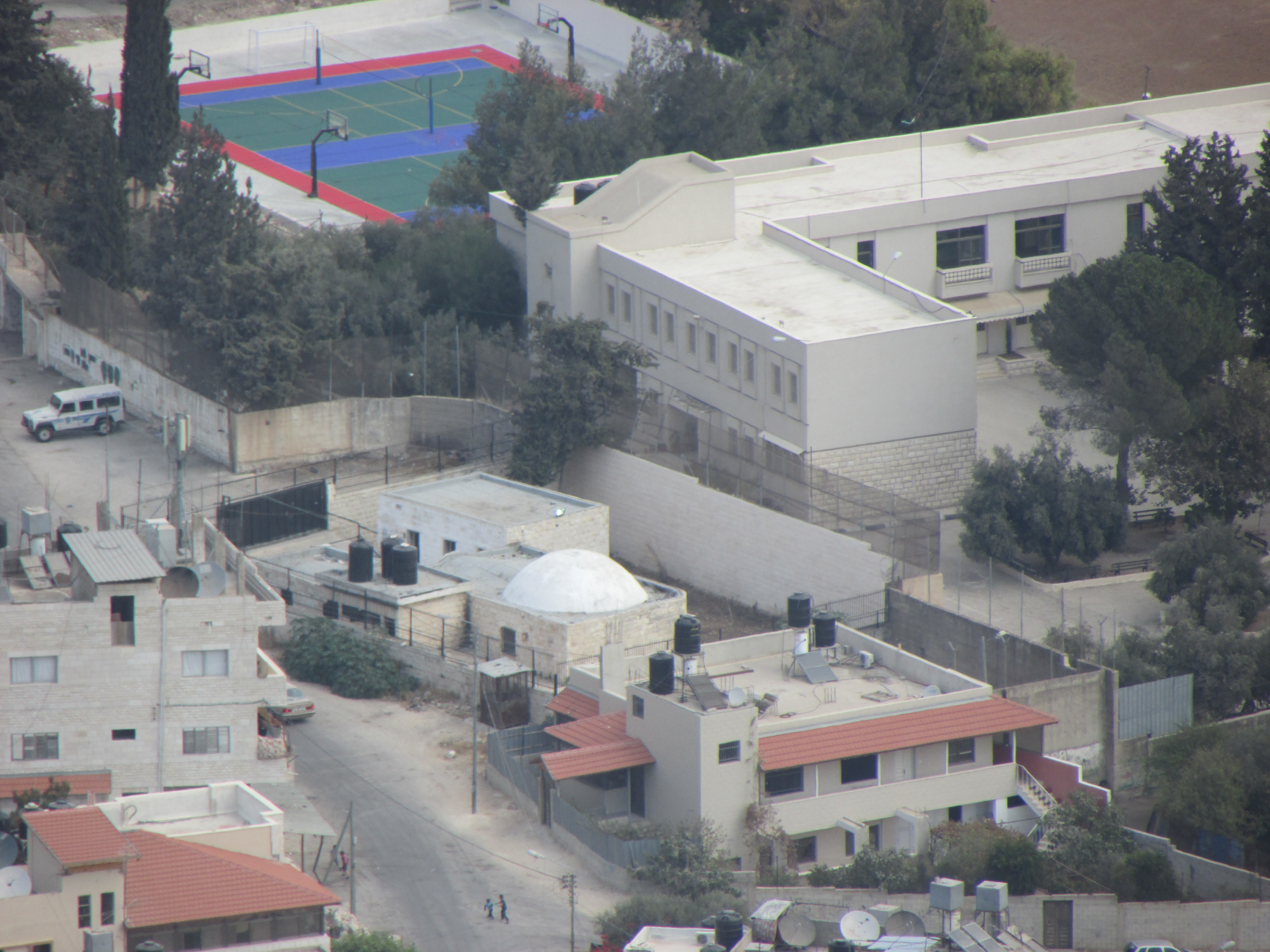
The tomb

As of 2009, monthly visits to the tomb in bullet-proof vehicles under heavy IDF protection are organised by the Yitzhar based organization Shechem Ehad. In late April 2009, a group of Jewish worshipers found the headstone smashed and swastikas painted on the walls, as well as boot prints on the grave itself.

In August 2010, it was reported that the IDF and the Palestinian Authority reached an agreement on renovating the site. Israel's chief rabbis, Yona Metzger and Shlomo Amar, visited and prayed at the tomb along with 500 other worshippers, the first such visit by a high-ranking Israeli delegation in 10 years.

On 24 April 2011, Palestinian Authority police officers opened fire on three cars of Israeli worshipers after they finished praying at Joseph's tomb. An Israeli citizen was killed and three others were wounded. The fatality was identified as Ben-Joseph Livnat, 25, the nephew of Culture Minister Limor Livnat. Both the Israel Defense Forces and Palestinian Authority ordered investigations into the incident. According to an initial investigation, three cars full of Israelis entered the compound of Joseph's tomb without coordination with the Israeli military or Palestinian security forces and then tried to break through a Palestinian Authority police checkpoint. The IDF investigation concluded that the Palestinian police officers had acted "maliciously" and with the intent to harm the Jewish worshipers. IDF Chief of Staff Benny Gantz added that they fired "without justification and with no immediate threat to their lives".

Three Palestinian police officers were tried in a Palestinian Authority court and convicted of firing into the air, ultimately serving two years in a PA jail. They were arrested by the IDF after being released from PA custody in May 2013 and eventually sentenced to prison terms by Israeli military courts. The patrol commander, Saleh Hammad, served a longer sentence. He was released from PA custody in 2020 and arrested and charged by the IDF soon after.

==== Arson attacks ====
On 7 July 2014, Palestinians tried to burn down Joseph's tomb while protesting. Palestinian Authority security forces were able to stop the protesters before they were able to burn it down. On December 22, 2014, Jews who were visiting the tomb to light candles for the Jewish holiday of Hanukkah discovered that the site had been vandalized. Lights were broken and electrical wiring had been cut. It was the first time Jews were allowed to visit the tomb in over a month.

On 16 October 2015, amid a wave of violence between Palestinians and Israelis, hundreds of Palestinians overran the tomb and a group of them set it on fire. Palestinian security forces dispersed them and extinguished the flames and although the tomb itself was not apparently damaged, the women's section was heavily damaged according to the Walla website. Israeli security forces later arrived at the scene. According to a Palestinian official, the Palestinians had attempted to set up barricades in the area to prevent home demolitions by the Israeli Army, but a group of them proceeded to attack the tomb.

Israel's Deputy Foreign Minister Tzipi Hotovely said that the tomb is under Palestinian control and yet Palestinians put the place ablaze, showing that "their only goal to harm places which are holy to Jews, which teach our thousands year old connection to that place".

At 2 a.m. on the night of 18 October 2015, a group of 30 Jews on instruction from Rabbi Eliezer Berland, went to the tomb without permits, in contravention of a standing IDF order, to clean and paint the compound that was burned three days before. As they were attacked by Palestinians, six of them were bruised by beatings, and one of their vehicles was burnt. They claimed that the Palestinian police, who had detained them, had also beaten them, before they were handed over to the Israeli army, which had been called to extract the others.

In September 2021, a convoy of buses carrying Jews for Sukkot prayers at the site were attacked by a group of Palestinians. Two Border Police officers were injured during the clash.

On 9 April 2022, about 100 Palestinians stormed Joseph's Tomb, shattering the tombstone and damaging a chandelier and an electrical enclosure. Two Haredi Jews were moderately wounded by gunfire while trying to enter the site the following day.

== See also ==
- Joseph's Well
- Mitzpe Yosef

== Bibliography ==
- Abu El Haj, N. (2001). Facts on the ground: archaeological practice and territorial self-fashioning in Israeli society. University of Chicago Press. ISBN 978-0-226-00195-1.
- Adler, Elkan Nathan (2004) [1930]. Jewish Travellers. Routledge. ISBN 978-0-415-34466-1.
- Aran, Gideon (1994). "Jewish Zionist Fundamentalism : The Bloc of the Faithful in Israel (Gush Emunin)". In Marty, Martin E.; Appleby, R. Scott (eds.). Fundamentalisms observed. University of Chicago Press. pp. 265–344. ISBN 9780226508788.
- BBC1 (3 December 1999). "Mayor halts Temple Mount dig". BBC. Archived from the original on 15 February 2017.
- BBC2 (October 1, 2002). "Israeli army returns to Arafat compound". BBC. Archived from the original on 7 March 2004.
- Bishop Alexander (October 26, 1844). "The Well of Jacob and Tomb of Joseph". The Church of England magazine. Vol. 17. London: J. Burns for the Church Pastoral-aid Society. p. 280. Archived from the original on March 7, 2021.
- Benjamin of Tudela (1840). Asher, Adolf (ed.). The itinerary of Rabbi Benjamin of Tudela. Vol. 1. London and Berlin: A. Asher % Co. Archived from the original on 2021-03-08.
- Bonar, Andrew Alexander; M'Cheyne, Robert Murray (1839). Narrative of a mission of inquiry to the Jews from the Church of Scotland in 1839. Philadelphia: Presbyterian board of publications.
- Browne, John Ross (1853). Yusef: or, The Journey of the Fungi (i.e Frangi): A crusade in the East. Harper. ISBN 9781404780453.
- Bruce, Frederick Fyvie (1994) [1983]. The Gospel of John. Wm. B. Eerdmans Publishing. ISBN 978-0-8028-0883-7. Archived from the original on 2020-06-14.
- Conder, Claude R. (1878). Tent Work in Palestine: A Record of Discovery and Adventure. Vol. 1. Richard Bentley & Son for the Committee of the Palestine Exploration Fund.
- Conder, Claude R.; Kitchener, Herbert (1882). Palmer, Edward Henry; Besant, Walter (eds.). Survey of Western Palestine : Memoirs of the Topography, Orography, Hydrography and Archeology. Vol. 2. The Committee of the Palestine Exploration Fund.
- Conder, Claude R. (2004) [1889]. Palestine. Kessinger Publishing. ISBN 9781417970988.
- Crown, Alan David (1989). "The Byzantine period and Moslem Period". In Alan David, Crown (ed.). The Samaritans. Mohr Siebeck. pp. 55–81. ISBN 978-3-16-145237-6.
- Crosby, Howard (2010) [1851]. Lands of the Muslim: A Narrative of Oriental Travel. BiblioBazaar. ISBN 978-1-172-08279-7.
- anonymous (May 30, 2002). "Tanks roll back into Nablus". Daily Telegraph. Archived from the original on 29 February 2016.
- de Hoop, Raymond (1999). Genesis 49 in its literary and historical context. Oudtestamentische studiën, Oudtestamentisch Werkgezelschap in Nederland. Vol. 39. BRILL. ISBN 978-90-04-10913-1. Archived from the original on 2020-08-04.
- de Saulcy, Louis Félicien Joseph Caignart; de Warren, Edouard (1854). Narrative of a journey round the Dead Sea, and in the Bible lands, in 1850 and 1851. Vol. 1 (2 ed.). R. Bentley. Archived from the original on 2020-06-26.
- Dor, Danny (2004). Intifada hits the headlines: how the Israeli press misreported the outbreak of the second Palestinian uprising. Indiana University Press. ISBN 978-0-253-21637-3. Archived from the original on 2020-07-13.
- Dudkevitch, Margot (October 11, 2000). "Palestinians refurbish Joseph's Tomb". Jerusalem Post.
- Dumper, Michael (2002). The politics of sacred space: the old city of Jerusalem in the Middle East conflict. Lynne Rienner Publishers. ISBN 978-1-58826-226-4.
- Dumper, Michael (2007). "Nablus". In Dumper, Michael; Stanley, Bruce E. (eds.). Cities of the Middle East and North Africa: a historical encyclopedia. ABC-CLIO. pp. 265–267. ISBN 978-1-57607-919-5. Archived from the original on 2020-08-01.
- Enderlin, Charles (2003). Shattered dreams: the failure of the peace process in the Middle East, 1995–2002. Other Press, LLC. ISBN 978-1-59051-060-5.
- Feige, Michael (2007). "Recovering Authenticity:West Bank Settlers and the Second Stage of National Archeology". In Kohl, Philip L.; Kozelsky, Mara; Nachman, Ben Yehuda (eds.). Selective remembrances: archaeology in the construction, commemoration, and consecration of national pasts. University of Chicago Press. pp. 277–298. ISBN 978-0-226-45059-9.
- Finkelstein, Israel; Silberman, Neil Asher (2001). The Bible Unearthed: Archaeology's New Vision of Ancient Israel and the Origin of Sacred Texts. Simon and Schuster. ISBN 978-0-7432-2338-6. Archived from the original on 3 June 2016.
- Forlong, J. G. R. (2003) [1906]. "The Dead". Encyclopedia of Religions or Faiths of Man. Kessinger Publishing. ISBN 978-0-7661-4307-4. Archived from the original on 14 June 2020.
- Freund, Richard A. (2009). Digging Through the Bible: Modern Archaeology and the Ancient Bible. Rowman & Littlefield. ISBN 978-0-7425-4645-5. Archived from the original on 2020-06-30.
- Gafni, Shlomo S.; van der Heyden, A. (1982). The glory of the Holy Land. The Jerusalem Publishing House. ISBN 978-0-521-24612-5.
- Gazit, Shlomo (2003). Trapped fools: thirty years of Israeli policy in the territories. Routledge. ISBN 978-0-7146-5489-8.
- Geike, Cunningham (1887). The Holy Land and the Bible: a book of Scripture illustrations gathered in Palestine. London: Cassell. Archived from the original on 2011-02-08.
- Gitlitz, David Martin; Davidson, Linda Kay. (2006). Pilgrimage and the Jews. Westport: CT: Praeger. ISBN 978-0-275-98763-3.
- Golden, Jonathan (2004). "Targeting Heritage: The Abuse of Symbolic Sites in Modern Conflicts". In Rowan, Yorke M.; Baram, Uzi (eds.). Marketing heritage: archaeology and the consumption of the past. Rowman Altamira. pp. 183–202. ISBN 978-0-7591-0342-9. Archived from the original on 2016-05-13.
- Goldman, Shalom (1995). The wiles of women/the wiles of men: Joseph and Potiphar's wife in ancient Near Eastern, Jewish, and Islamic folklore. SUNY Press. ISBN 978-0-7914-2683-8. Archived from the original on 2020-08-04.
- Gross, Tom (October 11, 2000). "Letting a dangerous genie out of the bottle". Jerusalem Post. Archived from the original on 4 June 2011.
- Guérin, V. (1874). Description géographique, historique et archéologique de la Palestine. Vol. 1. Paris: Imprimerie Nationale. ISBN 978-0-521-86662-0.
- Guinn, David E. (2006). Protecting Jerusalem's holy sites: a strategy for negotiating a sacred peace. Cambridge University Press. ISBN 978-0-521-86662-0.
- Gutman, Matthew; Lazaroff, Tovah (February 21, 2003). "Joseph's Tomb destruction 'very serious,' says PM aide". Jerusalem Post.
- Hackett, Horatio Balch (1857). Illustrations of Scripture: A Tour Through the Holy Land. T. Nelson and sons.
- Hackett, H.B. (1863). "Shechem". In Smith, William (ed.). A dictionary of the Bible: comprising its antiquities, biography, geography, and natural history. Little, Brown, and Co. Archived from the original on 26 June 2020.
- Harel, Amos (October 10, 2000). "IDF: Palestinians building mosque on Joseph's Tomb site". Haaretz. Archived from the original on 27 September 2011.
- Hassner, Ron Eduard (2009). War on sacred grounds. Cornell University Press. ISBN 978-0-8014-4806-5. Archived from the original on 1 August 2020.
- Hayden, Robert M. (2002). "Intolerant sovereignties and 'multi-multi' protectorates: competition of religious sites and (in)tolerance in the Balkans". In Hann, C. M. (ed.). Postsocialism: ideals, ideologies, and practices in Eurasia. Routledge. pp. 159–179. ISBN 978-0-415-26257-6. Archived from the original on 2020-08-02.
- Hermann, Tamar (2009). The Israeli peace movement: a shattered dream. Cambridge University Press. ISBN 978-0-521-88409-9. Archived from the original on 2020-06-14.
- Hirschberg, Peter (November 6, 2000). "Israel fears Palestinian mob damage at other West Bank holy sites". The Jerusalem Report. Archived from the original on 7 November 2012.
- Inbari, Motti (2009). Jewish fundamentalism and the Temple Mount: who will build the Third Temple?. SUNY Press. ISBN 978-1-4384-2624-2. Archived from the original on 2020-06-14.
- Kerkeslager, Allen (1998). "Jewish Pilgrimage and Jewish Identity in Hellenistic and Early Roman Egypt". In Frankfurter, David (ed.). Pilgrimage and holy space in late antique Egypt. BRILL. pp. 99–225. ISBN 978-90-04-11127-1. Archived from the original on 2021-03-08.
- Kershner, Isabel (October 23, 2008). "Pilgrimage to Roots of Faith and Strife". New York Times. Archived from the original on 9 December 2008.
- Kohen, Eli (2007). History of the Byzantine Jews: a microcosmos in the thousand year empire. University Press of America. ISBN 978-0-7618-3623-0. Archived from the original on 2021-11-07.
- La Guardia, Anton (2007). Holy Land, unholy war: Israelis and Palestinians (3 ed.). Penguin Books. ISBN 978-0-14-102801-9.
- Le Strange, Guy (2010) [1890]. Palestine Under the Moslems: A Description of Syria and the Holy Land from A.D. 650 to 1500. Cosimo, Inc., 2010. ISBN 978-1-61640-521-2. Archived from the original on 2020-06-30.
- Levinson, Chaim; Pfeffer, Anshel (April 24, 2011). "Israelis shot in West Bank tried to break through Palestinian roadblock, probe shows". Haaretz. Archived from the original on 21 January 2012.
- Lidman, Melanie (October 20, 2015). "At Joseph's Tomb, a microcosm of the Israeli-Palestinian conflict". The Times of Israel. Archived from the original on 8 August 2016.
- Lipton, Edward P. (2002). Religious freedom in the Near East, northern Africa and the former Soviet states. Nova Publishers. pp. 46–2. ISBN 978-1-59033-390-7. Archived from the original on 2020-06-14.
- Louden, Bruce (2011). "The Odyssey and the myth of Joseph; Autolykos and Jacob". Homer's Odyssey and the Near East. Cambridge University Press. pp. 57–104. ISBN 978-0-521-76820-7. Archived from the original on 2020-08-03.
- Mandel, Jonah (20 August 2010). "Chief rabbis in rare visit to holy sites in Nablus, Jericho". Jerusalem Post. Archived from the original on 26 August 2010.
- Mark Twain (1869). The Innocents Abroad. Hartford, Connecticut: American Publishing Company. p. 553.
- Matthews, Mark (2007). Lost years: Bush, Sharon, and failure in the Middle East. Nation Books. ISBN 978-1-56858-332-7.
- Miller, Nancy (May–June 1985). "Patriarchal Burial Site Explored for First Time in 700 Years". Biblical Archaeology Review. 11 (3). Biblical Archeology Society. Archived from the original on 2016-01-22.
- Mills, John (1864). Three months' residence at Nablus, and an account of the modern Samaritans. J. Murray. Archived from the original on 2020-06-26.
- Moore, Megan Bishop; Kelle, Brad E (2011). Biblical History and Israel's Past: The Changing Study of the Bible and History. Wm. B. Eerdmans Publishing. ISBN 978-0-8028-6260-0. Archived from the original on 2016-07-29.
- Nahshoni, Kobi (20 August 2010). "Rabbis witness renovation of Joseph's Tomb". Yedioth Ahronoth. Archived from the original on 9 October 2011.
- Neusner, Jacob (1985). Genesis rabbah: The Judaic commentary to the book of Genesis : a new American translation. Vol. 3. Scholars Press. ISBN 0-89130-935-7.
- Niehoff, Maren (1992). The figure of Joseph in post-Biblical Jewish literature. Arbeiten zur Geschichte des antiken Judentums und des Urchristentums. Vol. 16. BRILL. ISBN 978-90-04-09556-4. Archived from the original on 2021-11-07.
- Pfeffer, Anshel (May 29, 2011). "IDF: Palestinian police intentionally targeted worshipers at Joseph's Tomb". Haaretz. Archived from the original on 4 September 2011.
- Pringle, D. (1998). The Churches of the Crusader Kingdom of Jerusalem: L-Z (excluding Tyre). The Churches of the Crusader Kingdom of Jerusalem: A Corpus. Vol. 2. Cambridge University Press. ISBN 978-0-521-39037-8.
- Pummer, Reinhard (1987). The Samaritans. BRILL. ISBN 978-90-04-07891-8. Archived from the original on 2021-11-07.
- Pummer, Reinhard (1993). "Joseph's Tomb". In Alan David, Crown; Reinhard, Pummer; Abraham, Tal (eds.). A companion to Samaritan studies. Mohr Siebeck. ISBN 978-3-16-145666-4. Archived from the original on 2020-08-11.
- Redford, Donald B. (1970). A study of the biblical story of Joseph: (Genesis 37–50). Supplements to Vetus Testamentum. Vol. 20. Leiden: Brill. Archived from the original on 2021-11-07.
- Redford, Donald B. (1993) [1992]. Egypt, Canaan, and Israel in Ancient Times. Princeton University Press. ISBN 978-0-691-00086-2. Archived from the original on 2020-07-15.
- Rivka, Ulmer (2009). Egyptian cultural icons in Midrash. Studia Judaica. Vol. 52. Walter de Gruyter. ISBN 978-3-11-022392-7. Archived from the original on 5 May 2016.
- Rothman, Lily (16 October 2015). "The History Behind a Biblical Site Under Attack". Time Magazine. Archived from the original on 17 October 2015.
- Rubenberg, Cheryl (2003). The Palestinians: in search of a just peace. Lynne Rienner Publishers. ISBN 978-1-58826-225-7. Archived from the original on 2021-11-07.
- Schenke, Hans-Martin (1967). "Jacobsbrunnen-Josephsgrab-Sychar. Topographische Untersuchungen und Erwägungen in der Perspektive von Joh. 4,5.6". Zeitschrift des Deutschen Palästina-Vereins. 84 (2): 159–184.
- Schwarz, Joseph (1850). A Descriptive Geography and Brief Historical Sketch of Palestine. Translated by Isaac Leeser. Philadelphia: A. Hart. Archived from the original on 2020-06-14.
- Sela, Neta (29 January 2008). "MKs demand restoration of Joseph's tomb". Yedioth Ahronoth. Archived from the original on 18 September 2013.
- Sennott, Charles M. (2003). The body and the blood: the Middle East's vanishing Christians and the possibility for peace. PublicAffairs. ISBN 978-1-58648-165-0. Archived from the original on 2021-11-07.
- Sharkansky, Ira (1997). Policy Making in Israel: Routines for simple problems and coping with the complex. University of Pittsburgh Press. ISBN 978-0-8229-5633-4.
- Sher, Gilead (2006). The Israeli-Palestinian peace negotiations, 1999–2001: within reach. Taylor & Francis. ISBN 978-0-7146-8542-7.
- Sills, Deborah (1997). "Strange Bedfellows: Politics and Narrative in Philo". In Breslauer, S. Daniel (ed.). The seductiveness of Jewish myth: challenge or response?. SUNY series in Judaica. SUNY. pp. 171–190. ISBN 978-0-7914-3602-8. Archived from the original on 9 May 2016.
- Sivan, Hagith (2008). Palestine in late antiquity. Oxford University Press. ISBN 978-0-19-928417-7. Archived from the original on 2021-03-09.
- Smith, Morton (1984). "Jewish religious life in the Persian period". In Davies, William David; Finkelstein, Louis (eds.). The Cambridge History of Judaism: Introduction; The Persian period. SUNY series in Judaica. Cambridge University Press. pp. 219–278. ISBN 978-0-521-21880-1.
- Sontag, Deborah (4 October 2000). "A Biblical Patriarch's Tomb Becomes a Battleground". The New York Times. Archived from the original on 27 May 2015.
- Sperling, S. David (2003). The Original Torah: The Political Intent of the Bible's Writers. NYU Press. ISBN 978-0-8147-9833-1. Archived from the original on 18 June 2013.
- Staff Report (February 3, 2008). "Israel to ask PA to repair Joseph's Tomb". Jerusalem Post.
- Stanley, Arthur Penrhyn (1856). Sinai and Palestine: in connection with their history. London: J. Murray.
- Shinan, Avigdor; Zakovitch, Yair (2012). From Gods to God: How the Bible Debunked, Suppressed, Or Changed Ancient Myths and Legends. University of Nebraska Press. ISBN 978-0-827-61144-3. Archived from the original on 2014-07-04.
- Sweeney, Marvin A. (2009). "Form criticism: The Question of the endangered Matriarchs in Genesis". In LeMon, Joel M.; Richards, Kent Harold (eds.). Method matters:essays on the interpretation of the Hebrew Bible in honor of David L. Petersen. Society of Biblical Literature. pp. 17–38. ISBN 978-0-521-21880-1.
- Tarabay, Jamie (October 11, 2000). "Israelis and Palestinians contest holy shrine". Associated Press. Archived from the original on 27 September 2011.
- Taylor, William Cooke (1838). Illustrations Of The Bible From The Monuments of Egypt. London: Tilt.
- Thomson, William McClure (1883). The Land and the Book: or Biblical illustrations drawn from the manners and customs, the scenes and scenery of the Holy Land. Harper.
- Tobler, Titus (1869). Palaestinae: Descriptiones ex saeculo IV, V et VI. Itinerarium Burdigala Hierosolymam. Peregrinatio S. Paulae. Eucherius De Loeis Sanctis. Theodorus De Situ Terrae Sanctae. St Gallen: Huber & Comp.
- Völter, Daniel (1909). Aegypten und die Bibel: die Urgeschichte Israels im Licht der aegyptischen Mythologie (4th ed.). Leiden: E.J. Brill. Archived from the original on 3 May 2016.
- Wagner, Matthew (February 15, 2007). "35 MKs want Joseph's Tomb reopened". Jerusalem Post.
- Wagner, Matthew (April 23, 2009). "Site of Joseph's Tomb vandalized". Jerusalem Post.
- Weiss, Efrat (November 14, 2007). "Palestinians clean Joseph's Tomb". Yedioth Ahronoth. Archived from the original on 20 October 2012.
- Weiss, Efrat (April 23, 2009). "Joseph's Tomb compound vandalized". Yedioth Ahronoth. Archived from the original on 29 June 2011.
- Wilson, John (1847). The lands of the Bible visited and described. Vol. 2. Edinburgh: William Whyte and Co.
- Wolf, C. Umhau (2006) [1971]. The Onomasticon of Eusebius Pamphili Compared with the Version of Jerome and Annotated. The Tertullian Project. Archived from the original on 11 August 2011.
- Wright, George R. H (October 1972). "Joseph's Grave under the Tree by the Omphalos of Shechem". Vetus Testamentum. Vol. 82. Brill. pp. 476–486.
- Wright, George R. H (1987). "An Egyptian God at Shechem". As on the first day: essays in religious constants. Brill. pp. 71–85. ISBN 978-90-04-08172-7.
- Zangenberg, Jürgen (2006). "Between Jerusalem and the Galilee: Samaria in the Time of Jesus". In Charlesworth, James H. (ed.). Jesus and Archeology. Wm. B. Eerdmans Publishing. pp. 392–431. ISBN 978-0-8028-4880-2. Archived from the original on 14 June 2020.
- Zunz, Leopold (1840). "On the Geography of Palestine from Jewish Sources". In Asher, Adolf (ed.). The itinerary of Rabbi Benjamin of Tudela. Vol. 2. London and Berlin: A. Asher % Co.
