= Sajur =

Druze town in Galilee, Israel

Sajur: סָג'וּר, סאג'ור; ساجور
- Local council

Hebrew transcription(s)
  - ISO 259: Saǧur
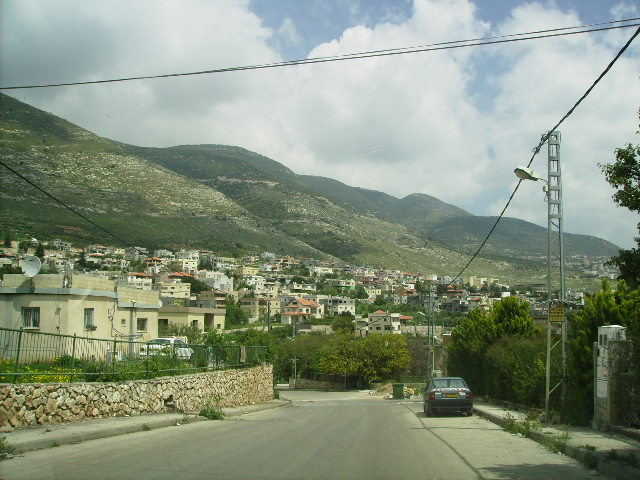
- View of Sajur

- Location within Northwest Israel Location within Israel
- Coordinates: 32°56′23.2″N 35°20′29.6″E
- Grid position: 182/260 PAL
- Country: Israel
- District: Northern
- Subdistrict: Acre
- Natural Region: Karmiel

Area
  - Total: 3,296 dunams (3.296 km^{2}; 1.273 sq mi)

Population (2024)
  - Total: 4,303
  - Density: 1,306/km^{2} (3,381/sq mi)
- Name meaning: Seijur, possibly from "a dog collar", or "red turbid water"

Sajur (Hebrew: סָג'וּר; Arabic: ساجور) is a Druze town (local council) in the Galilee region of northern Israel, with an area of 3,000 dunams (3 km^{2}). It achieved recognition as an independent local council in 1992. In 2024 it had a population of 4,303.

== History ==
Sajur is identified with Shazur, an ancient village associated with Simeon Shezuri. According to Jewish traditions, Ishmael ben Elisha ha-Kohen, Simeon Shezuri and Simeon ben Eleazar are buried in Sajur.

Excavations in 1951, 1980 and 1993, on behalf of the Israel Antiquities Authority revealed, respectively, a tomb with 13 loculi that dated to the Roman–Byzantine periods, a tomb with eight or nine loculi dating to the end of the second century CE and a small tomb with a single room dating to the first–second centuries CE. A salvage dig in January 2002, prior to building a car park, revealed a bedrock-hewn cave, devoid of finds, which may have been a tomb, and various unremarkable finds, although the presence of many finds at the bottom of the stratigraphic sequence is evidence of Iron Age occupation at Sajur.

In the Crusader era Sajur was known as Seisor or Saor. In 1249 John Aleman transferred land, including the casalia of Beit Jann, Sajur, Majd al-Krum and Nahf to the Teutonic Knights.

In 1322 Marino Sanuto the Elder showed Sajur on his map, named Seggori.

=== Ottoman Empire ===
Sajur was mentioned as a village in the Ottoman defter for the year 1555-6, located in the Nahiya of Acre of the Liwa of Safad. The land was designated as Sahi land, that is, land belonging to the Sultan.

In 1875, Victor Guérin noted that "It is today a small village, inhabited by Druze; it is located on a hill that was once completely covered with houses. At the bottom, some gardens are planted with fig, olive, pomegranate and mulberry trees."

In 1881, the PEF's Survey of Western Palestine (SWP) described it as: "A village, built of stone, containing about 100 Druzes; in the plain, with olives and arable land; water from cisterns and spring near".

A population list from about 1887 showed that Sejur had 190 inhabitants; all Druze.

=== British Mandate ===
In the 1922 census of Palestine conducted by the British Mandate authorities, Sajur had a population of 196; 176 Druze, 17 Muslims and 3 Christians, where the Christians were all Orthodox. The population increased in the 1931 census to 254; 141 Druze, 11 Muslims and 2 Christians, in a total of 53 houses.

In the 1945 statistics, Sajur had 350 inhabitants; 10 Muslims and 340 classified as “others” (=Druze). They owned a total of 8,172 dunams of land, while 64 dunams were public. 4 dunams were used for citrus and bananas, 1,380 for plantations and irrigable land, 1,933 for cereals, while 7 dunams were built-up (urban) land.

=== Israel ===
In 1992, Sajur was recognized as a local council.

== Demographics ==
Historical population
Year	Pop.	±%
1972	1,100	—
1983	1,900	+72.7%
1995	2,700	+42.1%
2008	3,700	+37.0%
2022	4,155	+12.3%
2024	4,304	+3.6%

According to Israel Central Bureau of Statistics, the town had a low ranking (3 out of 10) on the country's socioeconomic index (December 2001). The average salary that year was NIS 3,531 per month, whereas the national average was NIS 6,835. In 2022, 100% of the population was Druze.

== Voting Patterns ==
In the 2026 election, 49 percent of voters in Sajur voted for the parties of the center-left coalition led by Gadi Eisenkot, while 35 percent voted for Amcha Yisrael, 13 percent voted for the parties of the right-wing coalition led by Benjamin Netanyahu and 1 percent voted for the Arab parties. Voter turnout increased 11 percent from the 2022 election.

== Notable people ==
- Angelina Fares, gymnast, 2007 Miss Israel beauty pageant contestant and subject of "Lady Kul El Arab" documentary film

== See also ==
- Druze in Israel

== Bibliography ==
- Barbé, Hervé (2006-08-09). "Sajur Final Report". Hadashot Arkheologiyot – Excavations and Surveys in Israel (118).
- Barron, J.B., ed. (1923). Palestine: Report and General Abstracts of the Census of 1922. Government of Palestine.
- Conder, C.R.; Kitchener, H.H. (1881). The Survey of Western Palestine: Memoirs of the Topography, Orography, Hydrography, and Archaeology. Vol. 1. London: Committee of the Palestine Exploration Fund.
- Department of Statistics (1945). Village Statistics, April, 1945. Government of Palestine.
- Frankel, Rafael (1988). "Topographical notes on the territory of Acre in the Crusader period". Israel Exploration Journal. 38 (4): 249–272.
- Guérin, V. (1880). Description Géographique Historique et Archéologique de la Palestine (in French). Vol. 3: Galilee, pt. 1. Paris: L'Imprimerie Nationale.
- Hadawi, S. (1970). Village Statistics of 1945: A Classification of Land and Area ownership in Palestine. Palestine Liberation Organization Research Center.
- Mills, E., ed. (1932). Census of Palestine 1931. Population of Villages, Towns and Administrative Areas. Jerusalem: Government of Palestine.
- Palmer, E.H. (1881). The Survey of Western Palestine: Arabic and English Name Lists Collected During the Survey by Lieutenants Conder and Kitchener, R. E. Transliterated and Explained by E.H. Palmer. Committee of the Palestine Exploration Fund.
- Rhode, H. (1979). Administration and Population of the Sancak of Safed in the Sixteenth Century. Columbia University. Archived from the original on 2019-04-20.
- Röhricht, R. (1893). (RRH) Regesta regni Hierosolymitani (MXCVII-MCCXCI) (in Latin). Berlin: Libraria Academica Wageriana.
- Schumacher, G. (1888). "Population list of the Liwa of Akka". Quarterly Statement - Palestine Exploration Fund. 20: 169–191.
- Strehlke, E., ed. (1869). Tabulae Ordinis Theutonici ex tabularii regii Berolinensis codice potissimum. Berlin: Weidmanns.
