= Menachem ben Peretz of Hebron =

Menahem ben Peretz of Hebron (Hebrew: מְנַחֵם החברוני, romanized: Mǝnaḥēm haḤiḇroni; or Menachem ben R. Peretz of Hebron, or Menachen ben Peretz) is the alleged name of a French Jew who spent several years in Hebron in the first quarter of the 13th century. He is described as a writer of an epistle, in which, among other things, he documented the tradition of identification of Jewish holy sites in the Land of Israel, sites which he got to know from his conversations with Jewish inhabitants of the Land of Israel during his years of residence and travels there.

== Content ==
The treatise containing the epistle attributed to him is divided into two parts: The first part is a travelogue depicting a pilgrimage to various sites in the Land of Israel, and the second part is full of fiction stories. The second part describes Menachem as prayer leader for eight years in Hebron and specifies a date: Tammuz, ד'תתקע'"ה (1215).

The depiction of the journey begins in Hebron, where the author visited the tombs of ancestors; he then continued to the tomb of the prophet Jonah in Halhul, and from there, he proceeded to Rachel's Tomb in Bethlehem. He then went to Jerusalem, where he stayed and prayed in the presence of a large Jewish community. In Mount Zion, he saw the tombs of the family of Helena of Adiabene and was also able to see the location of the Temple in Jerusalem and the fact that the Western Wall still existed. From the Mount of Olives he looked out on the altar built by Ezra, and in the Valley of Josaphat he saw the Tomb of Zechariah "who was a priest and a prophet" and the Tomb of Absalom. From that point on, the journey becomes confusing, and the names of the sites listed are not arranged logically. In addition, various sites are not in the place known today. For example, he locates the tomb of Simeon bar Yochai at Kfar Hananya, and the tomb of Dinah, where the rest of the pilgrims place at Mount Arbel, he places near Nablus.

The second section of the travelogue is a collection of legends, each starting with the opening sentence: "And R. Menachem ben Peretz told us more."

Adolf Neubauer was the first to publish the essay in haLevanon paper (V, 40, 1868, p. 626-629), and Abraham Moses Luncz thereafter published it in HaMe'amer (III, 1919, p. 36-46).

== Credibility ==
Scholars are divided on the authenticity and the letter's reliability. The manuscript is in Oxford's Bodleian Library MS Bodl. Or. 135. Samuel Klein saw it as a 19th-century forgery, but Isaiah Sonne maintained it to be an ancient manuscript of the 14th century, and Professor Malachi Beit-Arié came to the conclusion that the description of the journey, as well as the entire codex which is in the letter, were written at the beginning of the 13th century. In Joshua Prawer's opinion, the letter is a fake, but this is not the work of an author of the 19th century but rather a forger of the 13th century. In his opinion, it is a failed fake that uses the descriptive passages of journeys of others, journeys that were perhaps already widespread in the Western Diaspora. In contrast, Elhanan Reiner sees the letter as "reliable, accurate and interesting".

The author himself apparently feared he would be suspected of improper motives, and so he writes in his letter:

And he who sees this letter from the names of the righteous stated above who stated names, may they not suspect me, and may they not say in their hearts that I wrote [this] for they would like me, or for to extract money from them because it is revealed and known before me those who spoke [that] the world was such, I received [this information] from Bnei Ma'araba (=The people of the Land of Israel), and if the seer will further question and say: 'How can the people of Ma'araba know? because the righteous people who were buried there, [its] 3000 years already?' and I the author will also answer them that it is from Bnei Ma'araba and not from me that it is written, because those who live in the Land of Israel today had not exiled from there to this day ... and each man received [this information] from his father from [the days of] the destruction of the temple and so they know all about it… and so I received it, Menachem of Hebron

== See also ==
- Joseph's Tomb
- Simeon Shezuri
