= Mitzpe Yosef =

Coordinates: 32°12′30.23″N 35°16′29.18″E

Mitzpe Yosef: מִצְפֵּה יוֹסֵף (Hebrew)
- Interactive map of Mitzpe Yosef
- Country: Palestine
- District: Judea and Samaria Area
- Council: Shomron
- Region: West Bank
- Founded: 2002

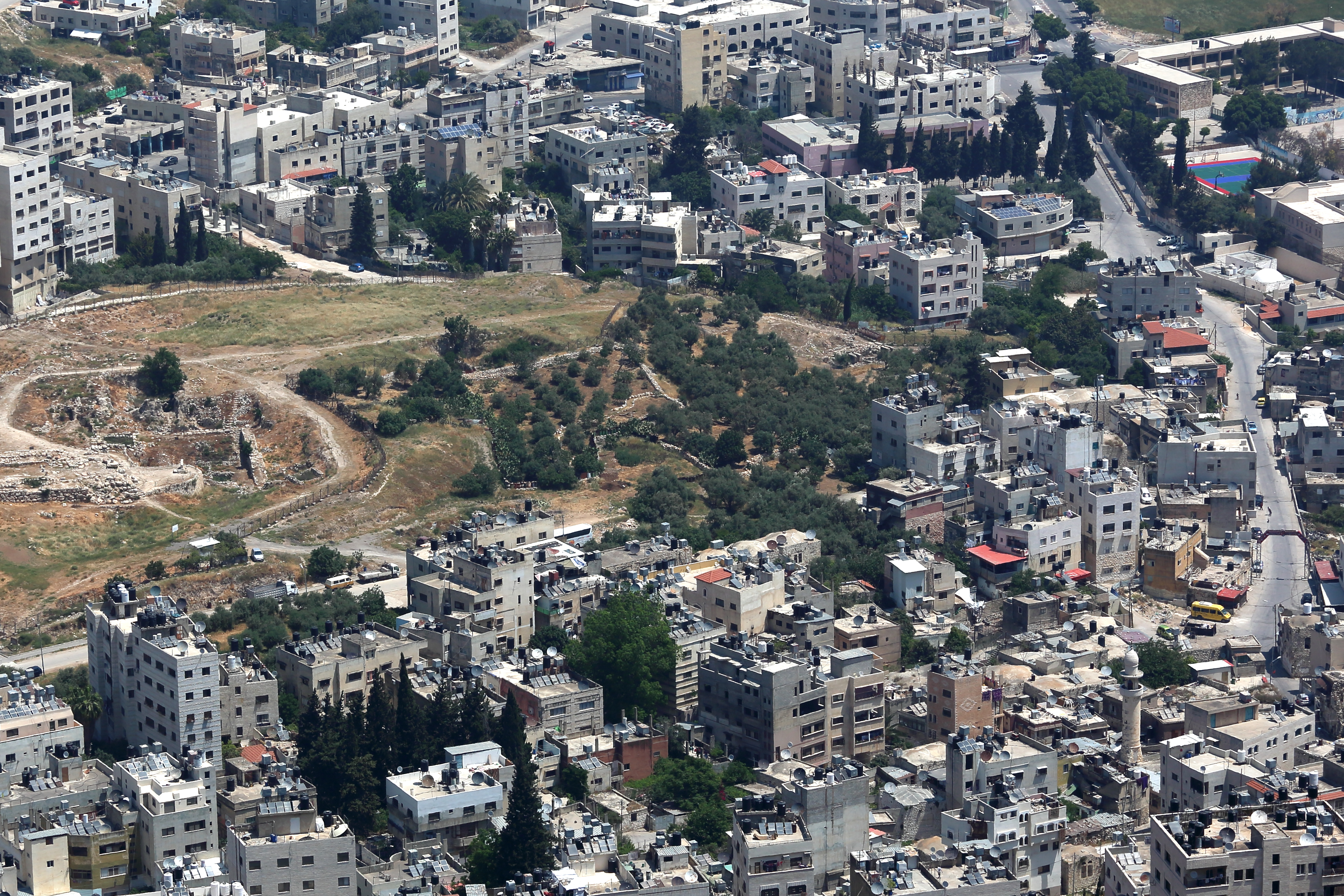
The old city of Shechem and Joseph's tomb as seen from Mitzpe Yosef.

Mitzpe Yosef (Hebrew: מִצְפֵּה יוֹסֵף, lit. Joseph's Lookout) is an Israeli outpost in the Israeli-occupied West Bank. Located on Mount Gerizim near Nablus, it falls within the jurisdiction of Shomron Regional Council. The population consists mostly of hasidic Jews belonging to the Breslov sect. The hilltop lookout overlooks Joseph's Tomb, an important Jewish holy site under Palestinian Authority control. The Tomb of Joseph is one of the oldest holy Jewish sites in history. Mitzpeh Yosef is the closest point to Joseph's Tomb that is accessible to Jews on a regular basis.

== Foundation ==
The outpost was established in 2002. Israeli outposts in the West Bank are considered illegal both under international law as well as under Israeli law.
