= Simeon Shezuri =

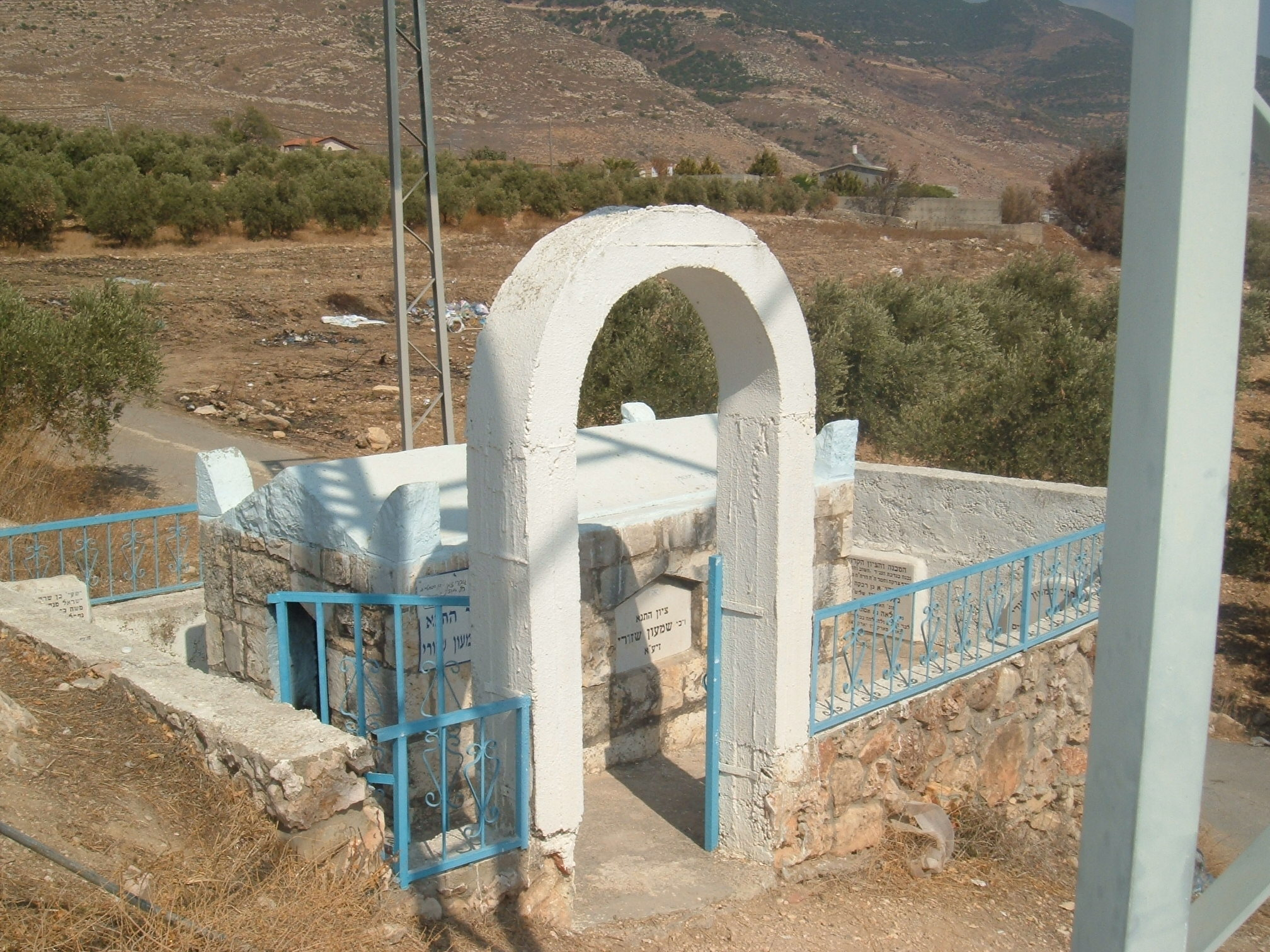
Tomb of Simeon Shezuri, Sajur, Israel

Simeon Shezuri (Hebrew: שמעון שזורי), or R. Simeon of Shezur, was a Jewish Tanna sage of the fourth generation.

== Biography ==
His surname Shezuri is either a variant of the Hebrew word Shezirah (שזירה), and thus stands for his livelihood: spinning fibers, or for the village he resided at: Shezor (probably in the vicinity of Sajur).

He was a pupil of R. Tarfon, and in one of the disputes over demai, he cites the ruling R. Tarfon had given him when an event occurred to him.

A tomb site attributed to Simeon Shezuri is located in Sajur. The written tradition concerning this tomb site began in early 13th century, noted by Menachem ben Peretz of Hebron who visited the area in 1215.

== Teachings ==
His work is frequently recorded in the Mishnah and Talmud.

The amoraim were divided regarding the status of his halachic rulings. Some believed that "wherever R. Simeon Shezuri stated his view, the halakha is in accordance with it" According to some views this is the case only when his opinion is recorded in the Mishnah, and according to other views, even when his opinion is cited in the baraita.

Other amoraim, such as Rabbi Yochanan, ruled that his views are in accordance with the halakha only in two instances: writing a divorce document for the dangerously ill, and terumat hamaaser on produce that belong to an "am ha'aretz" - a "Demai tithe". This was the approach accepted by the Rishonim. Nonetheless, R. Shabbatai ha-Kohen showed that there are additional cases where the Rishonim ruled according to Simeon Shezuri, yet not in all instances.
