= Anshel Pfeffer =

British-Israeli journalist (born 1973)

Anshel Pfeffer (Hebrew: אנשיל פפר; born 22 June 1973) is a British-Israeli journalist. He is a senior correspondent and columnist for Haaretz, covering military, Jewish and international affairs, and Israel correspondent for The Economist.

== Early life ==
Pfeffer was born to a Jewish family in Manchester in the United Kingdom.

== Career ==
Pfeffer has been a working journalist since 1997. He has written for a variety of publications including The Guardian, The New York Times, The Washington Post and The Times.

His Haaretz column, "Jerusalem & Babylon", was a series of articles which covered issues relating to Israel and to Jewish identity, for which he received the B'nai B'rith award for "Recognizing Excellence in Diaspora Reportage".

Pfeffer's British passport enabled Haaretz to send him to cover the 2011 Egyptian Revolution. Egypt is reluctant to permit entry to Israelis.

During the Gaza war, Pfeffer said Israel was not committing genocide, adding that those who accused it of genocide were either ignorant or blinded by hatred of Israel. Journalist Jordan Elgrably considers Pfeffer to be an "apologist" for Israeli government policies towards Palestinians.

In 2025, Pfeffer was invited to speak at the Edinburgh International Book Festival. Palestinian-American poet Fady Joudah accused Pfeffer of being a "genocide apologist" and withdrew from the festival in protest.

== Works ==
- Bibi: The Turbulent Life and Times of Benjamin Netanyahu, Basic Books, 2018.
