= Ali ibn Abi Bakr al-Harawi =

Persian traveller and poet (d. 1215)

Ali ibn Abi Bakr al-Harawi (d. 1215)—also known as Abu al-Hasan and Ali of Herat—was a 12th and 13th century Persian traveller originally from Herat, Afghanistan.

== Biography ==
Abū al-Ḥasan ʻAlī ibn Abū (or Abī) Bakr al-Harawī was born in Mosul. Al-Harawi travelled the Islamic world and died in Aleppo, Syria in a fort built for him.

The celebrated traveller came from a family from Herat. Ibn Khallikan noted: "There was neither sea nor land, plain nor mountain, to which access could be obtained, which he had not seen; and in every place to which he went, he wrote his name upon the walls, as I myself have observed in all the cities which I visited, and their number is certainly very great. To this he was indebted for his reputation and his name as a traveller became proverbial."

== Graffiti ==
The scholar al-Mundhri noted: "He used to write 'his name' on walls (graffiti) and there was hardly a well known place of a city or otherwise save that it will have his hand writing on it." He is the first known graffiti artist (wrote many inscriptions) in the Muslim world.

== Epitaph ==
He asked that the following epitaph be written on his tombstone: "Lived as a stranger, died a loner, no friend to eulogize him, no beloved to weep over him, no family to visit him, no brothers to visit his grave, no offspring to call on him, no wife to mourn over him, I have trod where no one has, walked into towns, travelled the high seas, seen many ruins, travelled to many cities, lived among people, I did not meet a true friend, or found agreement from a comrade, so whoever reads this inscription let him not be bedazzled by anyone."

== Magic ==
Ibn al-Wardi mentioned that he dabbled in natural magic (legerdemain and phantasmagoria), talisman and sleight of hand.

== Influence ==
Saladin's son was fond of him and had great regard for him and built a fort for him in Aleppo.

== Works ==
He authored:

- Kitab al-ishara ila ma`rifat al-ziyara (Book of indications to make known the places of visitations),
- Kitab al-khutab al-Harawia (Book of sermons by al-Harawi),
- al-Tadhkira al-Harawiya fi al-hiyal al-harabiya (al-Harawi's admonition regarding war stratagems).

== Sources ==
- al-Harrawi, Abu Hasan Ali b Abi Bakr. 1957. Guide des lieux de pelerinage (Kitab al-Isharat ila ma’rifat al-ziyarat). Ed. and Trans. S. Thoumine. Damascus: Ma’had al-faransi bi Dimshaq.
- Ibn Khallikan, Wafayat al-A'yan. English translation by M. De Slane, ed. S. Moinul Haq, Kitab Bhavan. New Delhi, 1996. 3:342-4.
- al-Zirkali, al-A`lam [Biographical Dictionary]. Beirut: Dar al-Ilm li-malayin, 15th printing, 2002. 4:266.
- Meri, J. 2005. Lonely Wayfarers Guide to Pilgrimage: Ali ibn Abi bakr al-Harawi’s Kitab al-Isharat ila ma rifat al-Ziyarat. Studies in Late Antiquity and Islam. Princeton, NJ: Darwin Press.
