= Safed massacre =

Safed massacre relates to several violent events, happening throughout different time periods in the town of Safed (Tzfat), Galilee in Israel.

Safed massacre may refer to:

- 1517 Safed attacks
- 1660 destruction of Safed, part of the Druze power struggle (1658–67)
- 1834 looting of Safed, part of the Syrian Peasant Revolt (1834–35)
- 1838 Druze attack on Safed, part of the 1838 Druze revolt
- 1929 Safed massacre, part of the 1929 Palestine riots

== See also ==
- History of the Jews and Judaism in the Land of Israel
- List of massacres in Ottoman Syria
- List of killings and massacres in Mandatory Palestine
