= 1517 Hebron attacks =

Pogrom in the Ottoman–Mamluk War

1517 Hebron attacks occurred in the final phases of the Ottoman–Mamluk War (1516–17), when Turkish Ottomans had ousted the Mamluks and taken Ottoman Syria. The attacks targeted the Jewish population of the city during the festival of Sukkot.

== Events ==
An account of the event, recorded by Japheth ben Manasseh in 1518, mentions how the onslaught was initiated by Turkish troops led by Murad Bey, the deputy of the Sultan from Jerusalem. Jews were attacked, beaten and raped, and many were killed as their homes and businesses were looted and pillaged. It has been suggested that the stable financial position of the Hebronite Jews at the time was what attracted the Turkish soldiers to engage in the mass plunder. Others suggest the attack could have in fact taken place in the midst of a localised conflict, an uprising by the Mamluks against the new Ottoman rulers. Some Jews tried to defend themselves. Those who survived the calamity fled to Beirut and Jews only returned to Hebron 16 years later in 1533.

== See also ==
- 1517 Safed attacks
- 1834 Hebron massacre
- List of massacres in Ottoman Syria
