= Safed Sanjak =

Subdivision of the Ottoman Empire

Sanjak of Safed سنجق صفد
- Sanjak of the Ottoman Empire
- Capital: Safed
- Area
  - Coordinates: 33°00′N 35°30′E
- Historical era: Ottoman Palestine
  - Safed attacks: 1517
  - Destruction of Safed: 1660
- Contained within
  - Eyalet: Damascus (1516–1660)
  - Eyalet: Sidon (1660–)
| Succeeded by |
| Acre Sanjak |
- Today part of: Israel

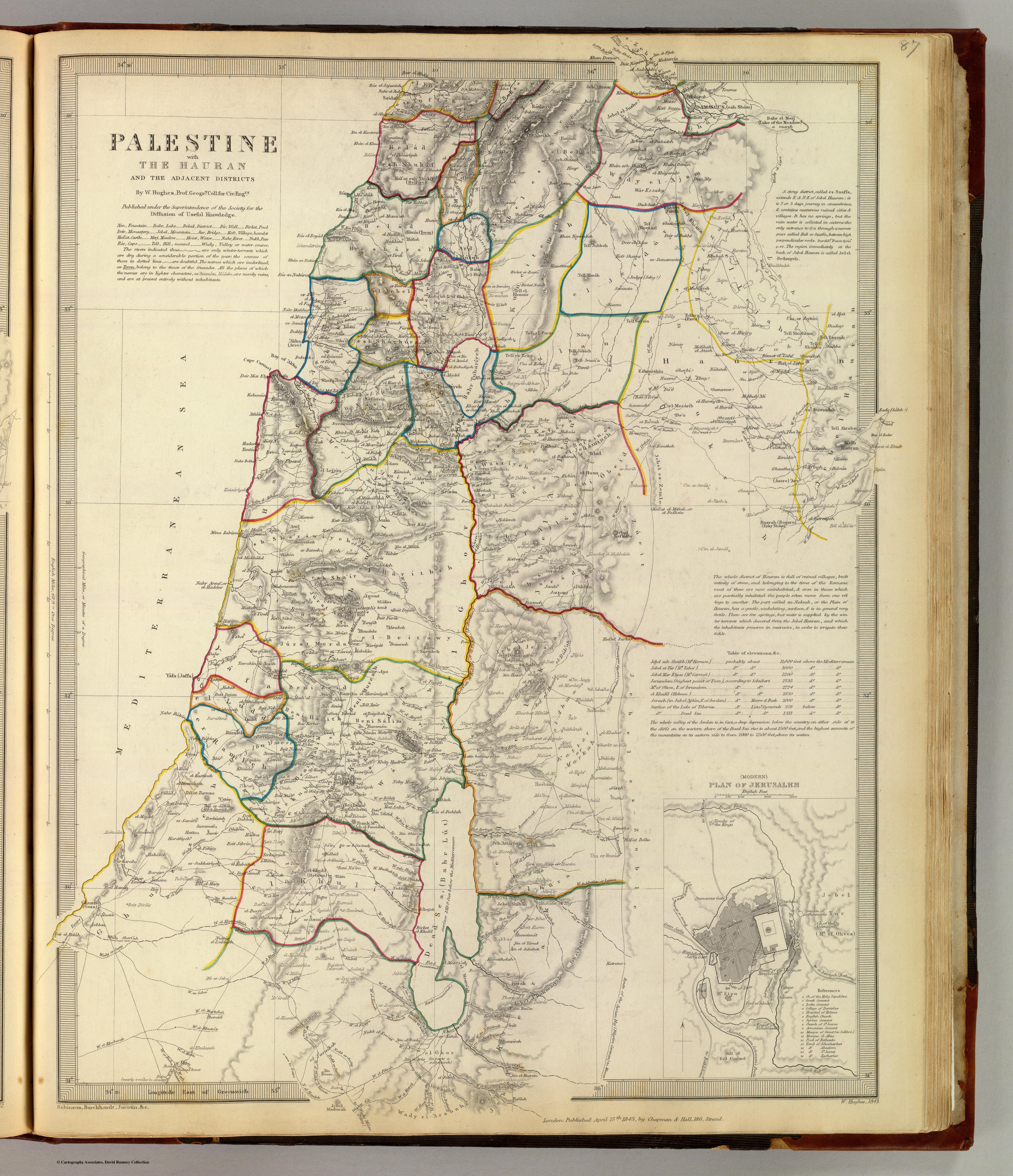
Palestine with the Hauran and the adjacent districts, William Hughes 1843

Safed Sanjak (Ottoman Turkish: سنجق صفد; Turkish: Safed Sancağı) was a sanjak (district) of Damascus Eyalet (Ottoman province of Damascus) in 1516–1660, after which it became part of the Sidon Eyalet (Ottoman province of Sidon). The sanjak was centered in Safed and spanned the Galilee, Jabal Amil and the coastal towns of Acre and Tyre. In the late 17th century or by the start of the 18th century, it dissolved as a sanjak and its former territory was subdivided into around ten smaller fiscal units of the Sidon Eyalet, Safed being the center of one such unit.

In the 16th century, the town of Safed was made up of Sunni Muslims and Jews. The Galilee was largely populated by Sunni Muslims and Druze, with smaller communities of Jews, while the areas north of the Galilee, in modern Lebanon, were mostly populated by Twelver Shia Muslims (Mitwalis).

== Territory and demographics ==
The territory of Safed Sanjak consisted of the area between the Zahrani River in the north to Mount Carmel (near Haifa) in the south, and the area between the Sea of Galilee in the east and the Mediterranean Sea in the west. Besides Safed, it included the port cities of Acre and Tyre and the entire Galilee and Jabal Amil area. The district had a mixed population of peasants and Bedouin. The inhabitants of the Jabal Amil region were predominantly Shia Muslim, specifically and historically called Mitwali, while the Galilee had a Sunni Muslim majority, including peasants and Bedouin, and a large Druze minority. The district also contained Jewish communities.

== Administrative divisions ==
In the 16th century, the Safed Sanjak was divided into the following five nahiyes (third-level administrative subdivisions) and amals (fourth-level administrative subdivisions):

- Nahiye of Jira — It roughly corresponded with the eastern Upper Galilee, surrounding the city of Safed. The name Jīra is likely a derivative of jār, Arabic for "neighbor", and the nahiye was previously known as al-Zunnār, Arabic for "belt" because it surrounded Safed.
  - Amal of Barr Safad
- Nahiye of Acre — It roughly corresponded with the western Upper Galilee.
  - Amal of Acre
  - Amal of Shaghur
  - Amal of Buqei'a
- Nahiye of Tiberias — It roughly corresponded with the Lower Galilee, and part of the boundary separating it from the nahiye of Jira was the Wadi al-Rubudiyeh (Zalmon) stream.
  - Amal of Tiberias
  - Amal of Nazareth
  - Amal of Marj Bani Amir — The amal included only part of the Jezreel Valley, the remaining part belonging to the Iqta of Turabay, which later became Lajjun Sanjak.
  - Amal of Kafr Kanna
- Nahiye of Tibnin — It roughly corresponded with southeastern Jabal Amil and was alternatively called Bilad Bani Bishara. Bishara may have been an Ayyubid officer who was granted the area as an iqta by Sultan Saladin, although Mamluk sources suggest the Banu Bishara were a Shia Muslim tribe which lived in the area. The boundary separating it from the nahiye of Acre to the south was the broad valley of Wadi al-Qarn, about 5 kilometers (3.1 mi) south of the modern Israel–Lebanon border.
  - Amal of Tibnin
  - Amal of Marjayoun
  - Amal of Jabal Amil
  - Amal of Tyre
- Nahiye of Shaqif — It roughly corresponded with northeastern Jabal Amil, and the boundary separating it from the nahiye of Tibnin to the south by the Litani and Hasbani rivers.
  - Amal of Shaqif

=== 17th century ===
Administratively, it is unclear if the Safed Sanjak persisted in its 16th–early 17th-century form after the creation of Sidon Eyalet in 1660. There is no available official information about the administrative divisions of Safed Sanjak during the 17th century. In 1670, the Turkish traveler Evliya Celebi noted that Sidon Eyalet consisted of six liwa (alternative word for sanjak), including the liwa of Safed and Acre.

=== 18th century ===
In the 18th century, there is no further reference to a sanjak or liwa of Safed. Instead, the Sidon Eyalet in that century, unique among other regional provinces, was only subdivided into smaller nahiye units, with no intermediate sanjak divisions. Far more frequently, these nahiyes were referred to as mukata'as (fiscal sub-units). While some mukata'as covered specific economic activities (like water works), the territorial mukata'as were synonymous with nahiyes. This administrative arrangement distiguished Sidon from most other Ottoman provinces, as these subdivisions were based strictly along fiscal lines rather than judicial lines. According to historian Amnon Cohen, it was a "logical" consideration for the central government to apply this system in Sidon Eyalet, as tax farmers (multazims) were better placed there to collect the taxes than kadis (judges) or their na'ibs (deputies).

The territory formerly constituting Safed Sanjak was referred to in the contemporary sources as Bilad Safad, but this was a geographic term rather than an administrative one and was restricted to the Galilee, excluding the mostly Shia Muslim (or Mitwali)-populated areas north of the Galilee which had formed part of Safed Sanjak. In his 1737 visit to the area, Richard Pococke alludes to this administrative evolution:

[Safed was] formerly the place of residence of the pasha of this country, on which account it was called the pashalic of Saphet [Safed Sanjak]; and the whole territory now goes by the name of the country of Saphet [Bilad Safad], but the pasha resides at Sidon and a cadi [kadi] from Constantinople lives here.

The former territory of Safed Sanjak was divided into ten nahiyes (or mukata'as), which remained largely unchanged over the course of the 18th century, save for occasional administrative mergers or minor territorial changes. They were the following:

- Mukata'a of Nazareth — Merged with Shefa-Amr by Ahmad Pasha al-Jazzar in 1777.
- Mukata'a of Shefa-Amr — Merged with Nazareth by Ahmad Pasha al-Jazzar in 1777. Only consisted
- Mukata'a of Rameh — Merged with Safed by Ahmad Pasha al-Jazzar in 1777. Synonymous with the Shaghur.
- Mukata'a of Safed — Merged with Rameh by Ahmad Pasha al-Jazzar in 1777.
- Mukata'a of Jira — Referred to as a separate nahiye than Safed in contemporary sources, as in 1708.
- Mukata'a of Acre — Confined to the port town of Acre.
- Mukata'a of Sahil Akka — Sahil Akka referred to the 'plain of Acre'. Its center was at times centered in Tarshiha or the close-by Jiddin fortress. When the fortress was dismantled by Ahmad Pasha al-Jazzar in the late 1770s, the village of al-Bassa became its center.
- Mukata'a of Bilad Bishara — Included the area north of Sahil Akka and Safed up to the area of Tyre. It was one of the Mitwali-populated units.
- Mukata'a of Iqlim al-Shumar — It was one of the Mitwali-populated units.
- Mukata'a of Iqlim al-Shaqif — It was one of the Mitwali-populated units.
- Mukata'a of Tyre — Confined to the port village of Tyre.
- Mukata'a of Marjayoun — Separated into its unit by Ahmad Pasha al-Jazzar (r. 1775–1804).

The mukata'as were generally farmed out to local potentates as iltizam (the holders of iltizam were called multazims. In the 18th century to the 1740s, the sheikhs of the Zayadina (sing. Zaydani) were often the multazims of Safed, Rameh, Nazareth and Shefa-Amr, and by the mid-1740s until 1775, Acre. Sahil Akka was typically in the hands of the Husayn family (based in Jiddin castle), while the Nafi, Shahin and Murad families often farmed Safed and Jira; after the rise of the Zaydani sheikh Daher al-Umar in the 1740s, these other families became his vassals to whom he subleased his iltizam. In the Mitwali country, the Nassars of the Ali al-Saghir clan, the Munkar clan, and the Faris family of the Sa'b clan, were the usual multazims of Bilad Bishara, Shumar and Shaqif, respectively. After the late 1760s, they became vassals of Daher as well, until his demise in 1775.

== History ==
=== Administrative origins and Ottoman conquest ===
Before Ottoman rule, Safed was the capital of its own mamlaka (province) of the Cairo-based Mamluk Sultanate. Administrative information about Mamlakat Safad derives mainly from two sources: the qadi (Islamic head judge) of Safed in the 1370s, Shams al-Din al-Uthmani, and the Mamluk historian al-Qalqashandi, who based much of his material about Mamlakat Safad on al-Uthmani's work. Most of the information about the mamlaka covers the period between 1260 and 1418, while little is known for the last century of Mamluk rule before the Ottoman conquest following the Battle of Marj Dabiq in 1516. Travelers' accounts from the 15th century describe a general decline of the region around Safed precipitated by famine, plagues, natural disasters and political chaos, and the flight of peasants from their villages to the main towns or their adoption of nomadism.

The Ottomans entered the territory of the mamlaka through the Daughters of Jacob Bridge and did not meet any resistance in or around Safed. They bypassed the city, setting up camps at the Daughters of Jacob's Bridge, Khan Jubb Yusuf, Khan al-Minya and Khan al-Tujjar, all located in the mamlaka, before proceeding to conquer Mamluk Egypt. While Selim I was in Egypt, rumors spread in Safed that he had been killed, spurring the townspeople to revolt against the Ottomans before being suppressed by the new authorities.

=== Prosperity in early to mid-sixteenth century ===
After its incorporation into the Ottoman Empire, Safed was reorganized into a sanjak administratively part of the Damascus Eyalet. Its jurisdiction roughly corresponded with the territory of Mamlakat Safad. Safed Sanjak prospered at least during the first sixty years of Ottoman rule, with displaced peasants returning to their villages and the town of Safed becoming a haven for Jews from Europe, who turned the town into a wool production center. The first known Ottoman land and tax survey in the sanjak was in 1525/26, followed by a second survey in 1538/39. The second survey shows substantial increases in the population and tax revenues, possibly a result of peasants returning to their villages and the stability brought by the early Ottoman rulers. In 1547–48, Safad Sanjak contained a total of 287 villages.

In the 16th century, the Sudun clan of Qana, who were Shia Muslims of purported Circassian origins, and the Al Shukr of Aynatha, a family of Shia seyyeds (religious leaders), dominated the Bilad Bishara nahiya of the sanjak.

=== Ascendancy of the Druze ===
The initial prosperity of the sanjak waned toward the end of the 16th century and remained in general decline, more or less extending until the 19th century. The native chronicler and Hanafi mufti of Safed, al-Khalidi al-Safadi (d. 1625), indicated in his writings that the closing years of the 16th century in the sanjak were marked by devastation and desolation, which is generally reflected in Ottoman government records.

In 1602 the Druze chieftain of the Chouf-based Ma'n dynasty and governor of Sidon-Beirut, Fakhr al-Din II, was appointed governor of Safed. Fakhr al-Din had become an increasingly powerful figure in the region and at the time enjoyed support from the Ottoman government. He was tasked in Safed with controlling the Shia Muslim clans, who were generally viewed more negatively by the Sunni Ottomans than the Druze, and like the Druze and Bedouin of the region in general, were in a frequent state of rebellion through their stockpiling of muskets and refusal to pay taxes. Three years after Fakhr al-Din's appointment, the Ottomans commended him for "guarding the country, keeping the Bedouins in check, ensuring the welfare and tranquility of the population, promoting agriculture and increasing prosperity". Khalidi, who became Fakhr al-Din's adviser and practical court historian, also testified that Bedouin brigandage along the highways of the sanjak ceased under Fakhr al-Din, resulting in peace and security, and that agriculture was thriving anew.

In 1614, a new eyalet (province) was created based in Sidon, and Safed was annexed to it. The province was disbanded later that year and Safed Sanjak reverted to Damascus Eyalet. During Fakhr al-Din's exile between 1613 and 1619, the Shia Muslim Harfush dynasty tried and failed to gain control of it. Around the same time, in 1617, the Shia Muslim clan of Munkar and the house of El Assaad Family of Ali Al-Saghir emerged, along with Al Shukr, as opponents of the Ma'ns in Bilad Bishara. After a five-year exile in Tuscany, Fakhr al-Din reestablished his position in the region, his power reaching its apex in the 1630s until he was killed by imperial Ottoman troops in 1635. Ali al-Saghir and his brother Husayn, who traced their origins to an old, influential Shia Muslim tribe, eliminated the rival clans of Sudun in 1639 and Al Shukr in 1649, thereafter establishing their family as the sole leaders of the Shia Muslim clans across Jabal Amil, including the areas of Tibnin, Hunin, Qana and Ma'araka.

The settlements of the Galilee, particularly Safed and Tiberias, deteriorated during the struggle to capture the region by the nephew of Fakhr al-Din, Mulhim ibn Yunus Ma'n, who ultimately gained control of Safed Sanjak in 1653. The following year, the Ali al-Saghir clan irked the authorities for not forwarding revenues from Tyre earmarked for a waqf (religious trust) in Damascus. It may have precipitated their decline, which was advanced with the deaths of Husayn and his son Hasan in 1655 and 1656. In 1660, the Sidon Eyalet was reestablished and Safed was once again annexed to it. The Ottoman governor of the new province launched a campaign against the Shia feudal lords, resulting in the deaths of Ali and many of his sons. Less powerful Shia clans, such as the El Zein family, filled the local leadership void in the aftermath, though the Ali al-Saghir regrouped toward the end of the century and may have maintained tacit support from the Ma'n.

Ahmad Ma'n died in 1697 without male progeny and the Ma'n tax farms in Sidon-Beirut Sanjak were transferred to Haydar Shihab by the Ottoman government. With the demise of the Ma'ns in the late 17th century, the Safad Sanjak also largely came under the control of the Shihab dynasty. The Shihabi emir, Bashir I, Haydar's uncle and the effective leader of the Shihab dynasty, launched a punitive campaign against the Ali al-Saghirs in Bilad Bishara in 1698, capturing Mushrif and his son Muhammad and transferring them to the custody of Sidon's governor Kaplan Pasha, brother of Tripoli Eyalet's governor and Shihab ally Arslan Mehmed Pasha. Bashir was afterward appointed the governor of Safed. He routed a coalition of the Ali al-Saghir, Sa'b and Munkar Shia clans in Nabatieh in 1707. Taking control of Bilad Bishara, he granted it to his Druze deputy Mahmud Abu Harmush.

== Bibliography ==
- Abbasi, Mustafa (February 2003). "The Arab Community of Safad 1840–1918: A Critical Period". Jerusalem Quarterly. 17: 49–58. doi:10.70190/jq.I17.p49.
- Abu-Husayn, Abdul-Rahim (1985). Provincial Leaderships in Syria, 1575-1650. Beirut: American University of Beirut. ISBN 9780815660729.
- Abu Husayn, Abdul Rahim (2004). The View from Istanbul: Ottoman Lebanon and the Druze Emirate. I.B.Tauris. ISBN 9781860648564.
- Cohen, Amnon (1973). Palestine in the 18th Century: Patterns of Government and Administration. Jerusalem: The Magnes Press. ISBN 978-0-19-647903-3.
- David, Abraham; Ordan, Dena (2010). To Come to the Land: Immigration and Settlement in 16th-Century Eretz-Israel. University of Alabama Press. ISBN 9780817356439.
- Ellenblum, R. (2003). Frankish Rural Settlement in the Latin Kingdom of Jerusalem. Cambridge University Press. ISBN 9780521521871.
- Falah, Salman (1975). "A History of the Druze Settlements in Palestine during the Ottoman Period". In Maoz, Moshe (ed.). Studies on Palestine during the Ottoman Period. Jerusalem: Magnes Press. ISBN 9789652235893.
- Philipp, Thomas (2001). Acre: The Rise and Fall of a Palestinian City, 1730–1831. Columbia University Press. ISBN 978-0-231-50603-8.
- Pococke, R. (1745). A Description of the East, and some Other Countries. Vol. 2. London: Printed for the author, by W. Bowyer.
- Rhode, H. (1979). The Administration and Population of the Sancak of Safad in the Sixteenth Century (PhD). Columbia University.
