= Ottoman Palestine =

Palestine under the Ottoman Empire

- 1517–1918
Mamluk Sultanate	Occupied Enemy Territory Administration
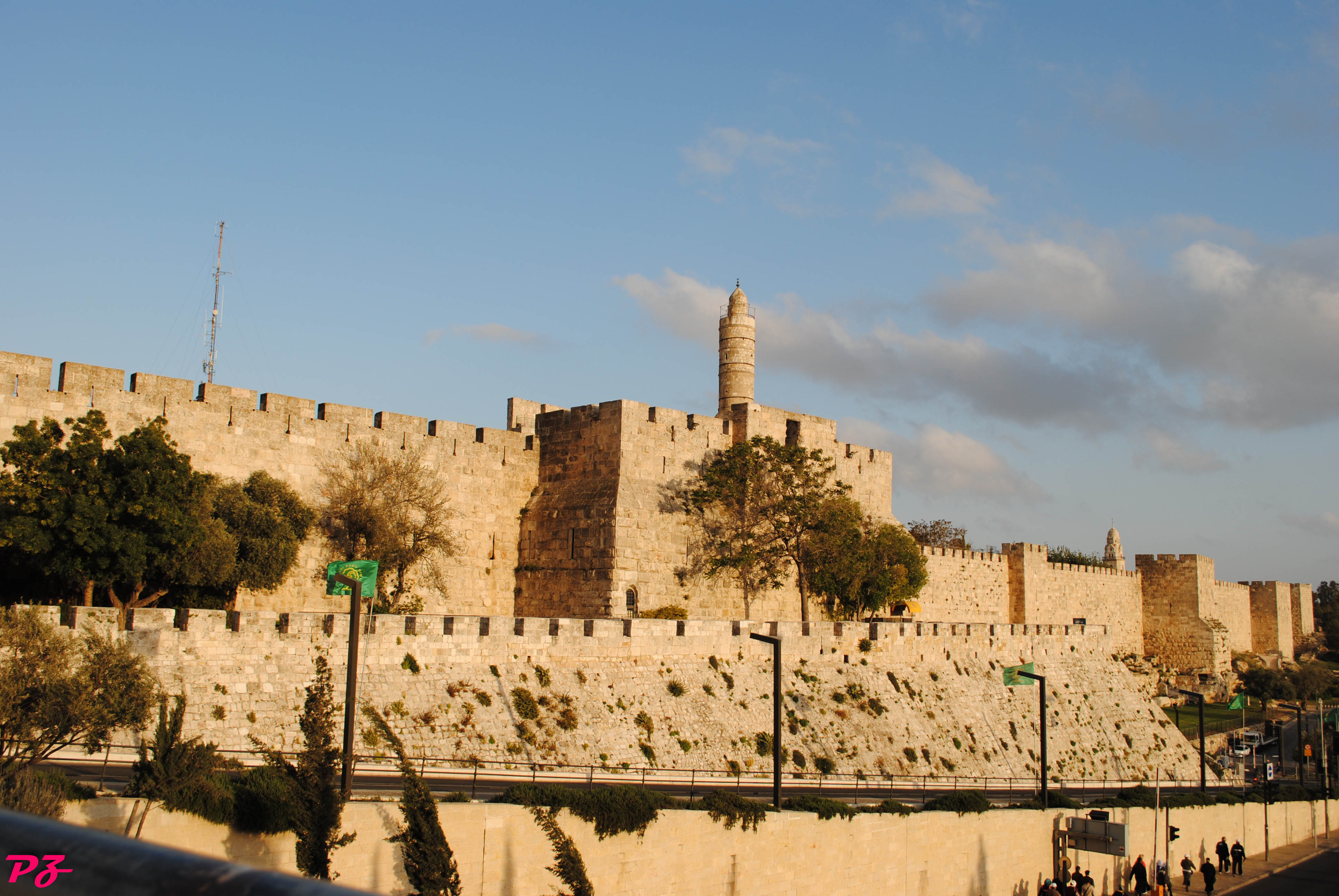
- The Walls of Jerusalem rebuilt in the 16th century
- Duration: 4 centuries
- Location: Southern Levant
- Including: Sanjaks: Jerusalem, Gaza, Safed, Nablus, Lajjun, Acre Mutasarrifate of Jerusalem
- Key events: Ottoman–Mamluk War; Druze power struggle; Naqib al-Ashraf revolt; Siege of Acre; Peasants' revolt; 1837 Galilee earthquake; Expansion of Jerusalem; First Aliyah; Sinai and Palestine campaign

Ottoman Palestine refers to the history of Palestine during its rule by the Ottoman Empire between 1517 and 1918 - the Ottoman period.

== Early Ottoman rule ==
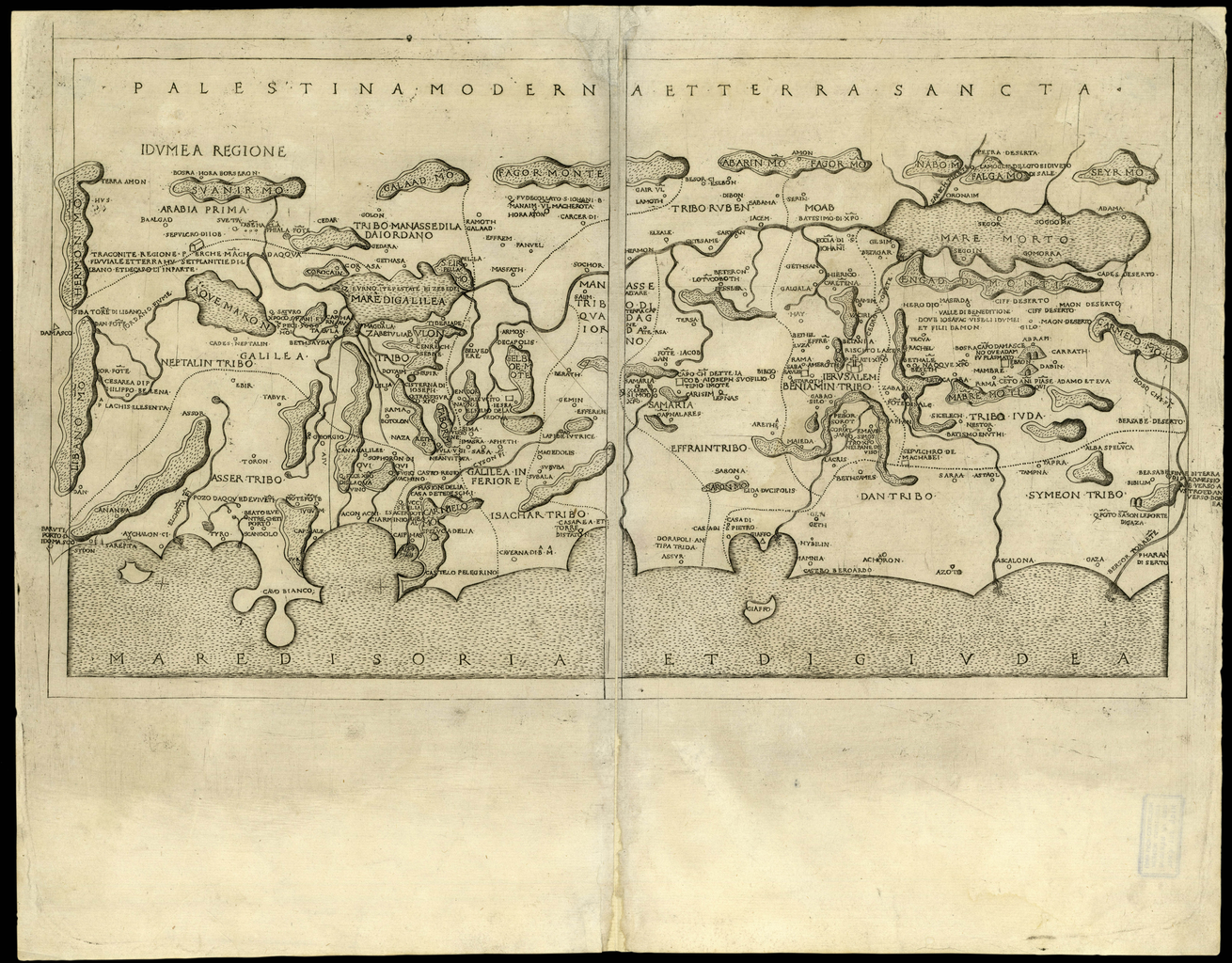
Map of Palestine and the Holy Land published in Florence around 1480 and included in Francesco Berlinghieri's expanded edition of Ptolemy's Geographia.

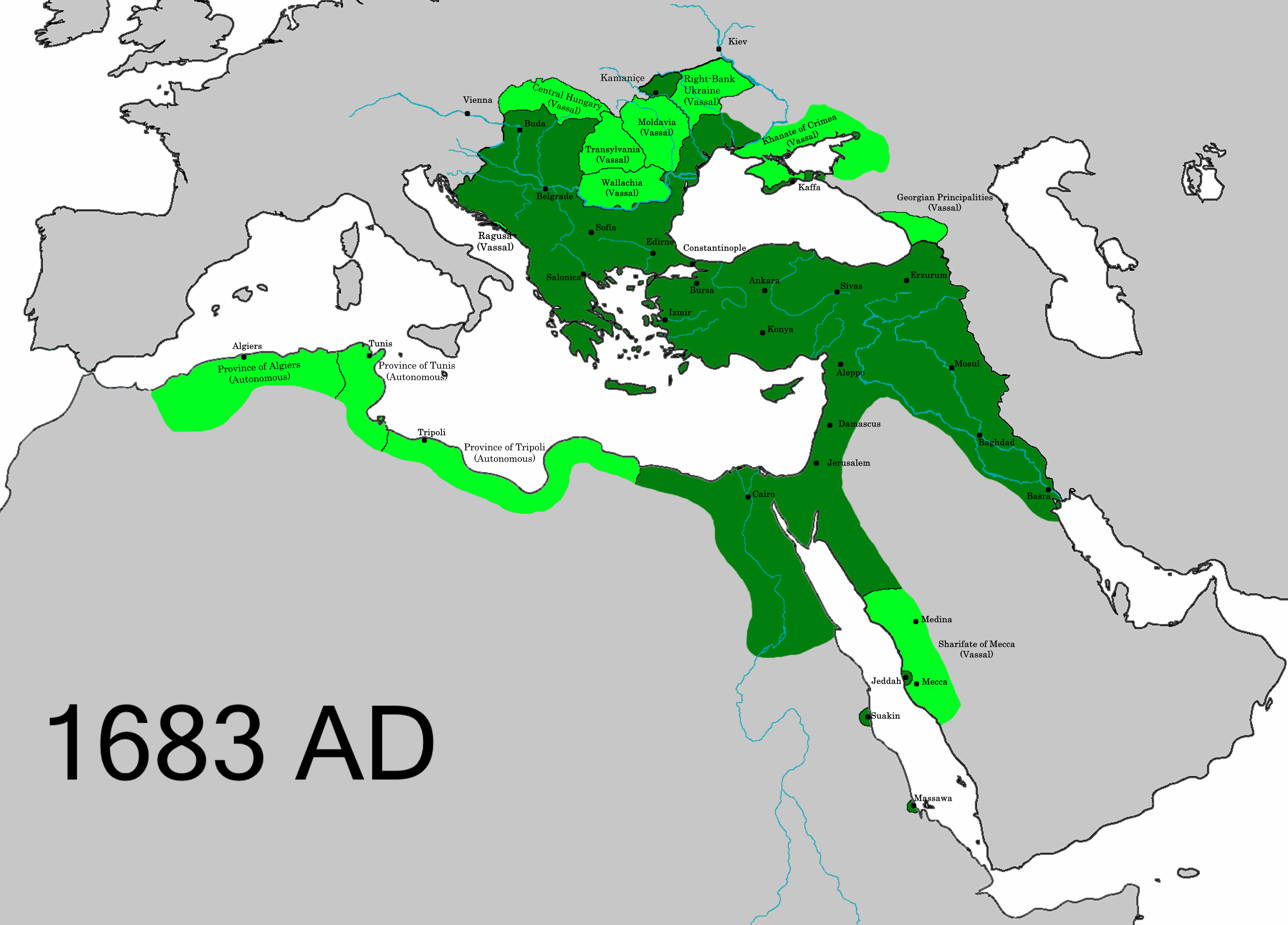
Territories of the Ottoman Empire in 1683, showing Jerusalem

In 1486, hostilities broke out between the Mamluk Sultanate and the Ottoman Turks in a battle for control over western Asia. The Ottoman Empire proceeded to conquer Palestine following their 1516 victory over the Mamluks at the Battle of Marj Dabiq. The conquest of Palestine during the Ottoman–Mamluk War (1516–1517) was relatively swift, with small battles fought against the Mamluks in the Jordan Valley and at the Battle of Yaunis Khan en route to the Mamluk capital in Egypt. There were also minor uprisings in Gaza City, Ramla and Safed, which were quickly suppressed.

The Ottomans maintained the administrative and political organisation that the Mamluks left in Palestine. The region of Syria became an eyalet 'province' ruled from Damascus, while the Palestine region within it was divided into the five sanjaks 'banners' (districts) of Safed, Nablus, Jerusalem, Lajjun and Gaza. The sanjaks were further subdivided into subdistricts called nawāḥī 'regions' (singular nāḥiya).

For much of the 16th century, the Ottomans ruled Damascus Eyalet in a centralised way, with the Istanbul-based imperial government, the Sublime Porte, playing a crucial role in maintaining public order and domestic security, collecting taxes, and regulating the economy, religious affairs and social welfare. Most of Palestine's population, estimated to be around 200,000 in the early years of Ottoman rule, lived in villages. The largest cities were Gaza, Safed and Jerusalem, each with a population of around 5–6000.

Ottoman property administration consisted of a system of land grants called timar and inalienable charitable financial endowments called awqāf (singular waqf). Timars were distributed by the Ottoman sultan to various officers and officials known as Timariots, particularly from the elite sipahi units. A timar was a source of income for its holder, who was responsible for maintaining order and enforcing the law in the timar. Waqf lands were managed by various individuals, and their revenues were dedicated to religious functions and institutions, social welfare, and individual beneficiaries. Over 60% of cultivated land in the Jerusalem Sanjak was waqf land. To a lesser extent, there was also privately owned land predominantly located within villages and their immediate vicinity.

The name "Palestine" was no longer used as the official name of an administrative unit under the Ottomans because they typically named provinces after their capitals. Nonetheless, the old name remained popular and semi-official, with many examples of its usage in the 16th, 17th and 18th centuries surviving. The 16th-century qadi of Jerusalem, Ebussuud Efendi, defined the term as an alternative name for the Ottoman Turkish term Arazi-i Muqaddas 'the Holy Land'. The 17th-century Ramla-based jurist Khayr al-Din al-Ramli often used the term Filasṭīn in his fatāwāt (religious edicts) without defining the term, although some of his fatawat suggest that it more or less corresponded with the borders of Jund Filastin. Thomas Salmon's 18th-century book, Modern history or, the present state of all nations, states that "Jerusalem is still reckoned the capital city of Palestine, though much fallen from its ancient grandeur."

=== Ridwan-Farrukh-Turabay period ===
By the end of the 16th century, direct Ottoman rule over Damascus Eyalet was weakened, partly due to the Celali rebellions and other Anatolian insurrections. The timar system, which functioned to serve the fiscal and military needs of the Ottoman government, was also becoming less relevant during this period. Consequently, a new governing elite emerged in Palestine consisting of the Ridwan, Farrukh, and Turabay dynasties, whose members provided the Sanjak-beys 'district governors' of the Gaza, Nablus, Jerusalem, and Lajjun sanjaks between the late 16th century and the late 17th century. The stability of their rule varied by sanjak, with Ridwan control of Gaza, Turabay control of Lajjun, and Farrukh control of Nablus largely continuous, and the Ridwan-Farrukh hold over Jerusalem frequently interrupted by governors appointed from Istanbul.

Ties between the families were solidified through inter-marriage, business and political cooperation. From the late 16th century until the early 18th century, the prestigious post of amir al-hajj 'commander of the Hajj caravan' would often be assigned to the district governor of Nablus or Gaza. This tradition laid the foundation for a durable military alliance between the three families since the departing amir al-hajj from one of these families would entrust authority over his sanjak to the governor of the neighboring sanjak. Gradually, the ties between the Ridwan, Farrukh and Turabay families led to the establishment of a single extended dynasty that held sway over much of Palestine.

In 1622, the Druze emir (prince) of Mount Lebanon, Fakhr al-Din II gained control of Safed Sanjak and was appointed governor of Nablus and mutasallim (chief tax collector) of Gaza. Alarmed at the looming threat to their rule, the Ridwan-Farrukh-Turabay alliance prepared for a confrontation with Fakhr ad-Din by pooling their financial resources to acquire arms and bribe Bedouin tribes to fight alongside them. They were also tacitly supported by the Sublime Porte, which was wary of Fakhr ad-Din's growing autonomy. When Fakhr ad-Din's better-equipped army launched an offensive to gain control of Palestine's coastal plain and Jerusalem, the army of Hasan Arab Ridwan, Ahmad Turabay and Muhammad ibn Farrukh routed his forces at the Awja River near Jaffa. In 1624, following the Battle of Anjar, Fakhr ad-Din was appointed the "Emir of Arabistan" by the Ottomans, which gave him official authority over the region between Aleppo and Jerusalem. He was deposed and hanged a decade later by the Wali of Damascus.

=== Imperial attempts at centralization ===
Gaza's political influence in Palestine rose under the Ridwan dynasty, particularly during the governorship of Husayn Pasha, which began in the 1640s. It was considered the "capital of Palestine" by the French consul of Jerusalem, Laurent d'Arvieux. Husayn's closeness with France and his good relations with Palestine's Christian communities were a source of imperial consternation at his rule. Concurrently, in the mid-17th century, the Ottoman government guided by the Köprülü viziers attempted to restore centralized authority over its outlier provinces. One of the centralization measures introduced by Grand Vizier Köprülü Mehmed Pasha was the establishment of the Sidon Eyalet in 1660, which administratively separated Safad Sanjak from the rest of Palestine, which remained part of Damascus Eyalet. This reorganization was done to both weaken the ambitious governors of Damascus and to maintain stricter control over the rebellious emirs of Mount Lebanon.

With the elimination of Fakhr ad-Din's threat to Ottoman control in the Levant, the Sublime Porte sought to bring an end to the Ridwan-Farrukh-Turabay dynasty. Beside concern over their increasing consolidation of power in Palestine, the Sublime Porte was frustrated by the substantially decreased revenues from the annual Hajj caravan, which a governor from one of the three families often commanded. In 1657, the Ottoman authorities launched a military expedition in Palestine to reassert imperial control over the region because of its strategic importance in the funding and protection of the Hajj caravan and also because it was a crucial link to Egypt. The Sublime Porte used Husayn Pasha's alleged incompetence leading the Hajj caravan in 1662–63 to imprison and execute him. Husayn Pasha served as the foundation of the Ridwan-Farrukh-Turabay alliance and his death was followed by the Sublime Porte's gradual elimination of the rest of the extended dynasty by the late 1670s. Ridwan rule persisted in Gaza until 1690.

The elimination of the Ridwan-Farrukh-Turabay dynasty and their replacement by governors appointed by the Ottoman government "radically changed the state of affairs" in Palestine, according to historian Dror Ze'evi. The appointed governors abandoned the relationships that the local dynasties maintained with the local elites and largely ignored the increasing exploitation of the populace by the Janissaries, subashis, and Timariots. Official complaints to the Sublime Porte about the latter groups skyrocketed among Muslims, Christians and Jews alike. Many peasants abandoned their villages to avoid exploitation, townspeople complained about the seizure of their property and the ulama (Muslim scholarly class) complained about the Janissaries' disregard for justice and the sanctity of Muslim places of worship, including the Temple Mount (Haram al-Sharif). In reaction to this state of affairs, in 1703, an uprising, known as the Naqib al-Ashraf Revolt, by the people of Jerusalem took place, led by the chief of the ashraf families, Muhammad ibn Mustafa al-Husayni, and backed by the city's notables. The home of Jerusalem's qadi, a symbol of imperial authority, was ransacked and his translator killed by rebels. They proceeded to govern the city themselves until an Ottoman siege and internal strife forced al-Husayni and his rebels to withdraw from Jerusalem in October 1705.

Meanwhile, the mostly Arab sipahi officers of the 1657 centralization expedition, chief among them members of the Nimr family, settled in Nablus and, contrary to the Sublime Porte's intention, began forming their own local power bases in the city's rural hinterland from the timars they were assigned. Towards the end of the 17th century, they were soon followed by the Jarrar and Tuqan families, who like the Nimrs, came from other parts of Ottoman Syria. The sheikhs (chiefs) of these families soon emerged as the new nobility of central Palestine. They developed increasingly close ties to the local population through selling or leasing their timar to rural notables, investing in local commerce, property and businesses such as Nabulsi soap factors, and intermarrying and partnering with local ashraf and mercantile families. Politically, the Tuqans and Nimrs dominated the governorship of Nablus and at times controlled other districts and subdistricts (in 1723 Salih Pasha Tuqan was governor of the Nablus, Lajjun and Gaza sanjaks). The Jarrars were the dominant clan of the Nablus hinterland, although other clans, among them the Mamluk-era Jayyusis, continued to hold influence in their respective subdistricts. This state of affairs in Jabal Nablus persisted with minor interruptions until the mid-19th century.

== Dominance of Acre and autonomy of Nablus ==
=== Zaydani period ===
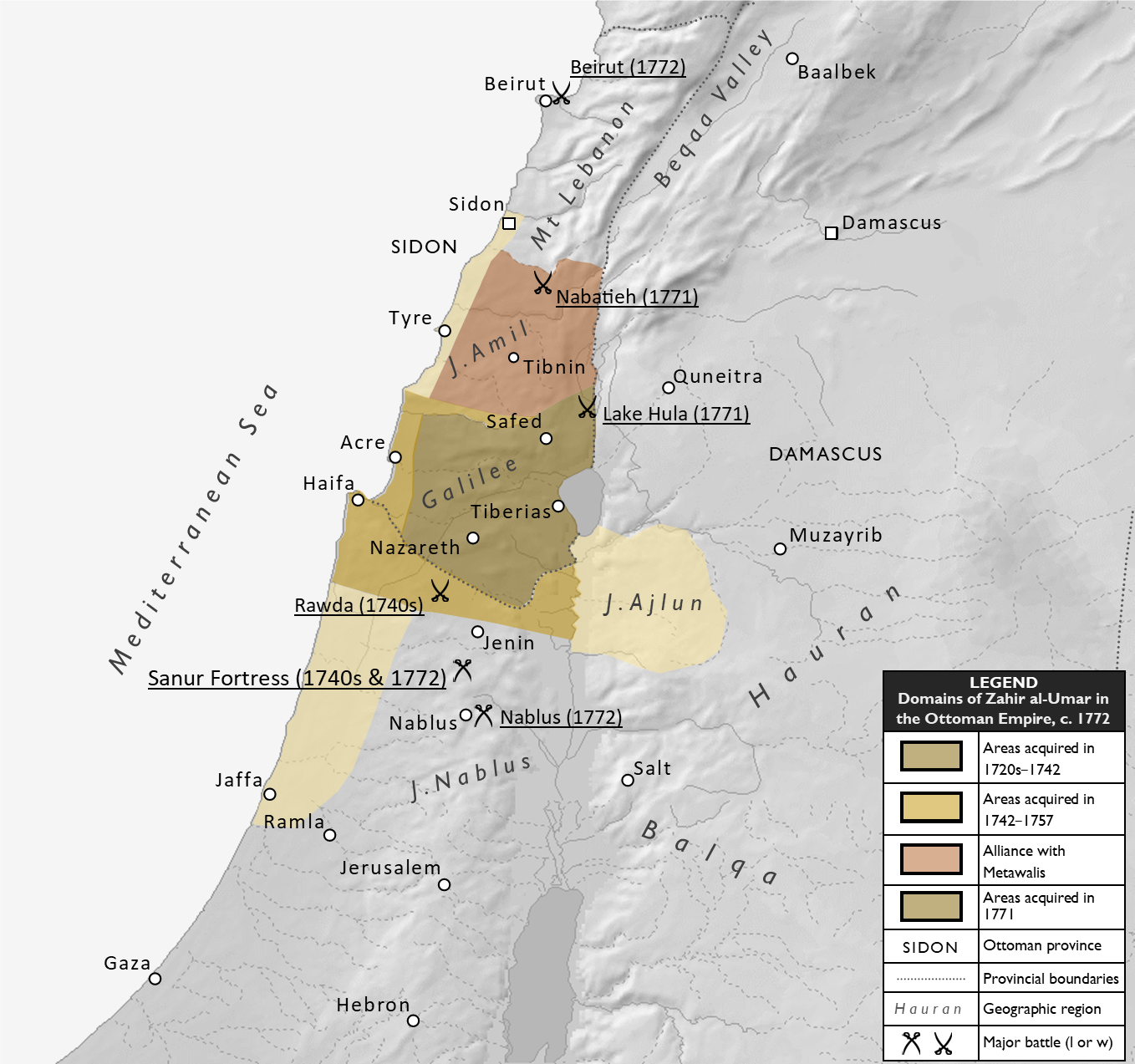
Map showing phases of expansion of the territory controlled by Daher al-Umar and his subordinates, in c. 1772

In the mid-17th century, the Zaydani family became a formidable force in northern Palestine. Initially, its sheikhs were appointed as multazems (tax collectors and local enforcers) of iltizam (tax farms) in parts of the Galilee by the Ma'ani, and, after 1697, the Shihabi emirs of Mount Lebanon. In 1730, Zaydani sheikh Daher al-Umar was directly appointed by the Wali of Sidon as the multazem of Tiberias, which he soon fortified, along with other Zaydani strongholds such as Deir Hanna, Arraba and Nazareth. Between that time and 1750, Daher had consolidated his control over the entire Galilee. He transferred his headquarters to the port village of Acre, which he renovated and refortified. Acre became the center of an expanding autonomous sheikhdom financed by a monopoly on cotton and other agricultural commodities from Palestine and southern Lebanon established by Daher. Daher's control of cotton and olive oil prices drew great revenues from European merchants, and these funds enabled him to marshal military resources needed to fend off military assaults by the governors of Damascus. Moreover, the monopolies ended the foreign merchants' manipulation of prices and financial exploitation of the local peasantry. Together with significantly improved general security and social justice, Daher's economic policies made him popular with the local inhabitants. Daher also encouraged immigration to Palestine and his rule attracted large numbers of Jews and Melkite and Greek Orthodox Christians from throughout Ottoman Syria, revitalizing the region's economy. Daher founded modern-day Haifa in 1769.

In the early 1770s, Daher allied himself with the Russian Empire and Ali Bey of Egypt. Together with Ali Bey's deputy commanders Ismail Bey and Abu al-Dhahab, and backed by the Russian Navy, Daher and his Lebanese Shia allies invaded Damascus and Sidon. Ali Bey's commanders abruptly withdrew from Damascus after briefly capturing it in June 1771, compelling Daher to withdraw from Sidon shortly thereafter. Uthman Pasha al-Kurji, the Wali of Damascus, renewed his campaign to eliminate Daher, but his forces were routed at Lake Hula in September 1771. Daher followed up this decisive victory with another major victory against Emir Yusuf Shihab's Druze forces at Nabatieh. By 1774, Daher's rule extended from Gaza to Beirut and included most of Palestine. The year after, however, a coalition of Ottoman forces besieged and killed him at his Acre headquarters. The Ottoman commander Jazzar Pasha subsequently waged a campaign that destroyed Deir Hanna's fort and ended Zaydani rule in the Galilee in 1776.

Although Acre and the Galilee were part of Sidon Eyalet while the rest of Palestine administratively belonged to Damascus, it was the rulers of Acre, beginning with Daher, that dominated Palestine and the southern Syrian districts. Damascus governors typically held office for short periods of time and were often occupied with protecting and leading the Hajj caravan (the office of amir al-hajj had become the responsibility of the Wali of Damascus in 1708), preventing them from asserting their authority over semi-autonomous areas such as the Nablus region. In contrast, Daher established Acre as a virtually autonomous entity, a process seen in other parts of the Ottoman Empire including Egypt, Mount Lebanon and Mosul. Moreover, Acre became the de facto capital of Sidon Eyalet during and after Daher's reign, and like Daher, his successors ruled Acre until their deaths. There were several military confrontations between Daher and the Jarrar clan starting in 1735 when the former occupied the latter's territory of Nazareth and the Jezreel Valley, which served as trade and transportation hubs. Meanwhile, in 1766, the Tuqan family had ousted the Jayyusis from the Bani Sa'b subdistrict, which was then occupied by Daher in 1771, stripping Nablus of its sea access. The conflict between Daher and the Tuqans culminated with the former's unsuccessful siege of Nablus later that year.

=== Jazzari period ===
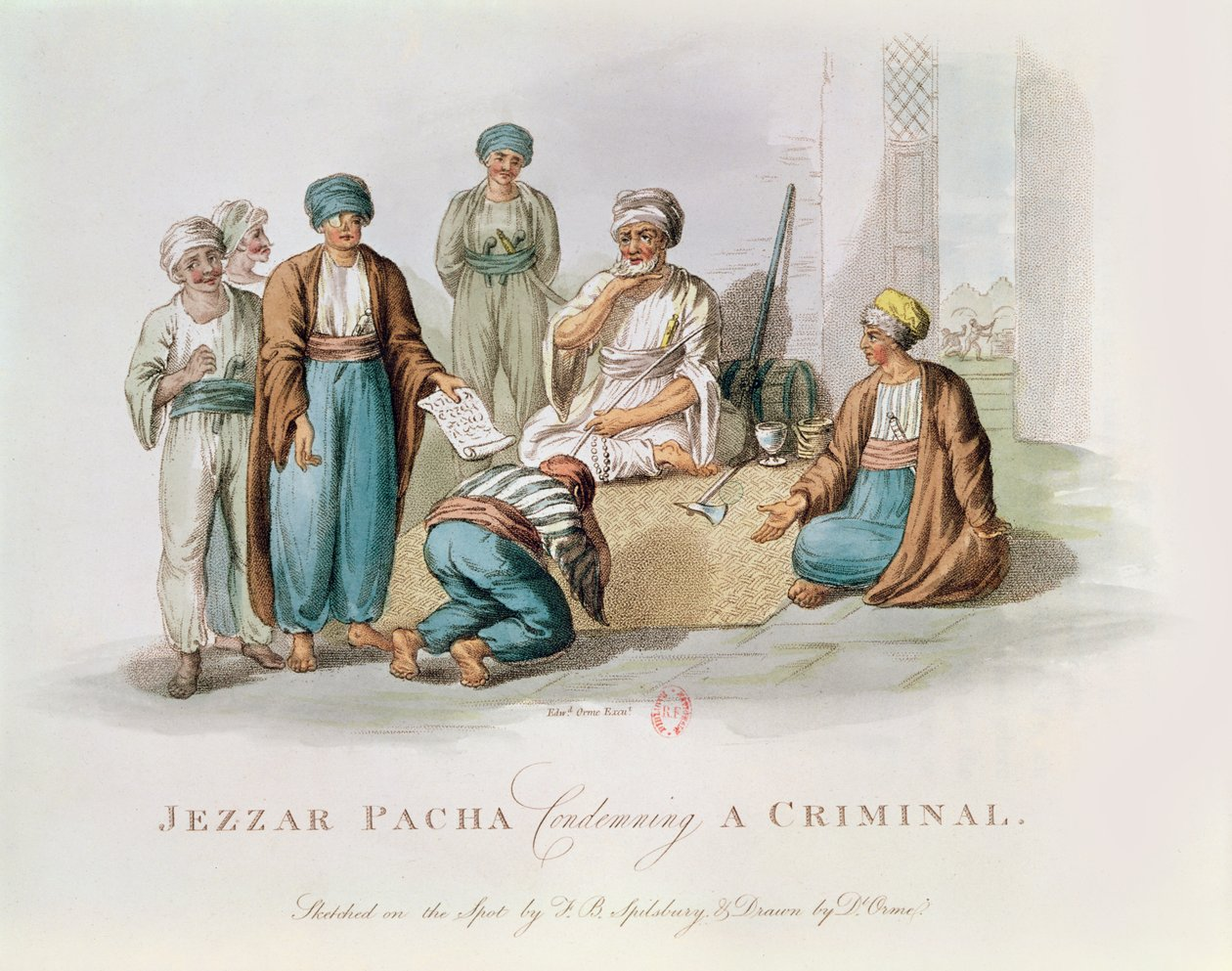
An illustration of Jazzar Pasha's court in Acre, 1800

Jazzar Pasha was appointed Wali of Sidon by the Sublime Porte for his role in uprooting the Zaydani sheikhdom. Unlike the Galilee-born Daher, Jazzar was a product of the Ottoman state and a force for Ottoman centralization, yet he also pursued his own agenda, extending his influence throughout the southern half of Ottoman Syria. Jazzar assumed control over Daher's cotton monopoly and further strengthened the fortifications of Acre, where he was based. He financed his rule through income generated from the cotton trade, as well as taxes, tolls and extortion. Tensions between Jazzar and the French cotton merchants of Acre ended with the latter being expelled in the late 1780s, at a time when prices for Palestine's cotton were declining due to alternative sources elsewhere. Like Daher, Jazzar was able to maintain domestic security by suppressing the Bedouin tribes. However, the local peasantry did not fare well under his stringent taxation policies, which resulted in many leaving the Galilee for neighboring areas. To protect his rule, he raised a personal army of mamluks (slave soldiers) and mercenaries consisting of troops from different parts of the Islamic world. Jazzar established close ties with the Tuqan family, who were traditionally aligned with the Ottoman authorities. However, the Tuqans' chief rival, the Jarrar family, resisted his attempts at centralization and Jazzar besieged them at their Sanur fortress in 1790 and 1795, both times ending in defeat.

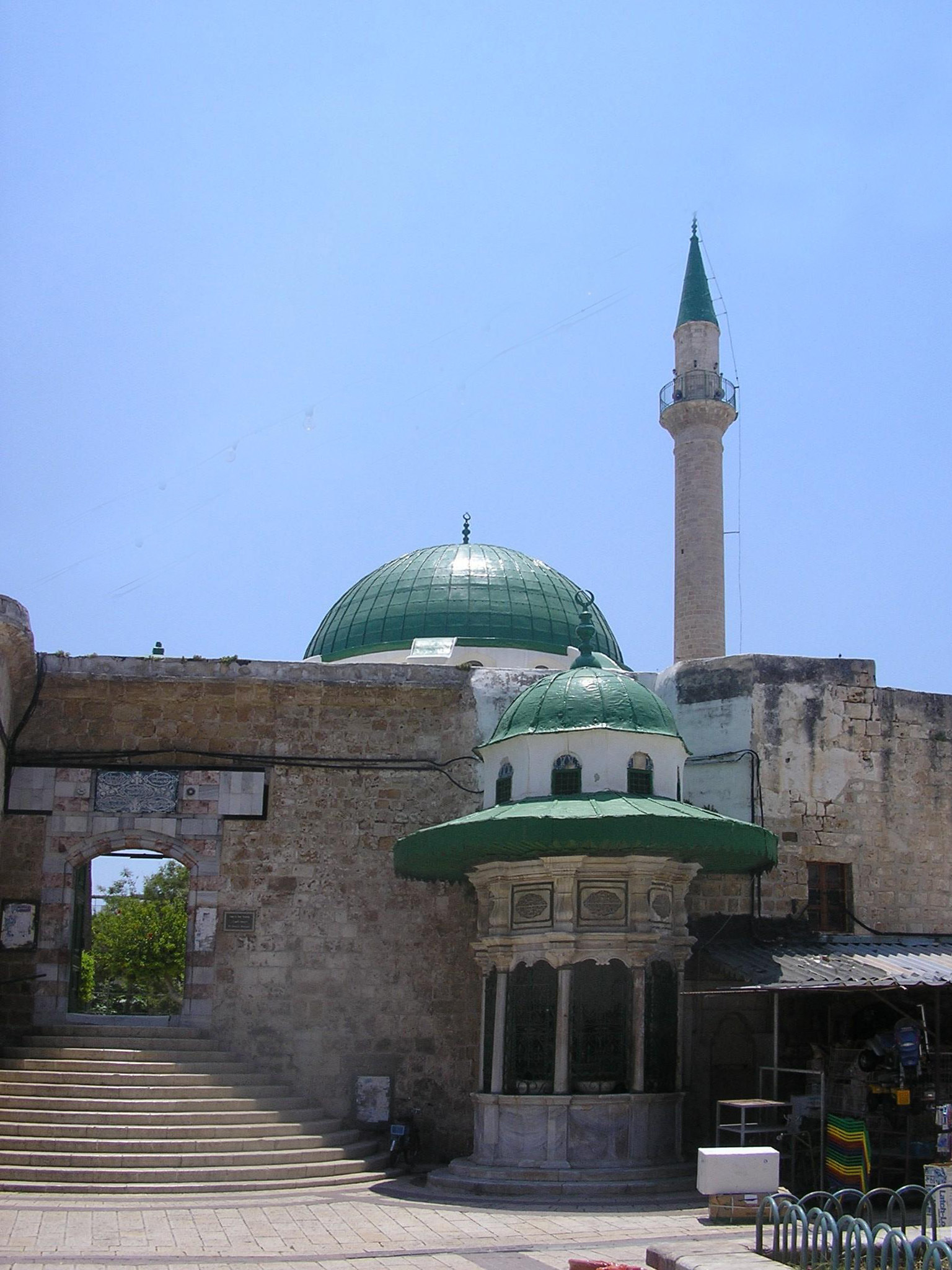
The Jazzar Mosque in Acre. Its founder, Jazzar Pasha, and his successor, Sulayman Pasha al-Adil, are buried in the mosque's courtyard

In February 1799, Napoleon Bonaparte entered Palestine after conquering Egypt as part of his campaign against the Ottomans, who were allied with his enemy, the British Empire. He occupied Gaza and moved north along Palestine's coastal plain, capturing Jaffa, where his forces massacred some 3,000 Ottoman troops who had surrendered and many civilians. His forces then captured Haifa and used it as a staging ground for their siege of Acre. Napoleon called for Jewish support to capture Jerusalem. This was done to gain favor with Haim Farhi, Jazzar's Jewish vizier. The invasion rallied the sheikhs of Jabal Nablus, with the multazem of Jenin, Sheikh Yusuf al-Jarrar, beckoning them to combat the French. In contrast to the sheikhs of the Hebron Hills and Jerusalem who provided conscripts to the Ottoman Army, the sheikhs of Jabal Nablus fought independently, to the chagrin of the Sublime Porte. Their men were defeated by the French in the Galilee. Napoleon failed to conquer Acre and his defeat by Jazzar's forces, backed by the British, compelled him to withdraw from Palestine with heavy losses in May. Jazzar's victory significantly boosted his prestige. The Ottomans pursued the French in Egypt in 1800, using Gaza as their launch point.

Jazzar died in 1804 and was succeeded as Wali of Sidon by his trusted mamluk Sulayman Pasha al-Adil. Sulayman, under Farhi's guidance, undertook a policy of loosening his predecessors' monopolies on the cotton, olive oil and grain trades. However, he also established Acre as the only Levantine port city allowed to export these cash crops. He also made significant cuts to Acre's military and adopted a decentralization policy of non-interference with his deputy governors, such as Muhammad Abu-Nabbut of Jaffa, and diplomacy with various autonomous sheikhs, such as Musa Bey Tuqan of Nablus. This marked a departure from the violent approach of Jazzar. By 1810, Sulayman was appointed to Damascus Eyalet, giving him control over most of Ottoman Syria. Before he was dismissed from the latter in 1812, he managed to have the sanjaks of Latakia, Tripoli and Gaza annexed to Sidon Eyalet. Towards the end of his rule, in 1817, a civil war broke out in Jabal Nablus between the Tuqans and a coalition of the Nimr, Jarrar, Qasim and Abd al-Hadi families over Musa Bey's attempt to monopolize power in Nablus by ousting the Nimrs. Sulayman mediated between the families and secured a temporary peace in 1818.

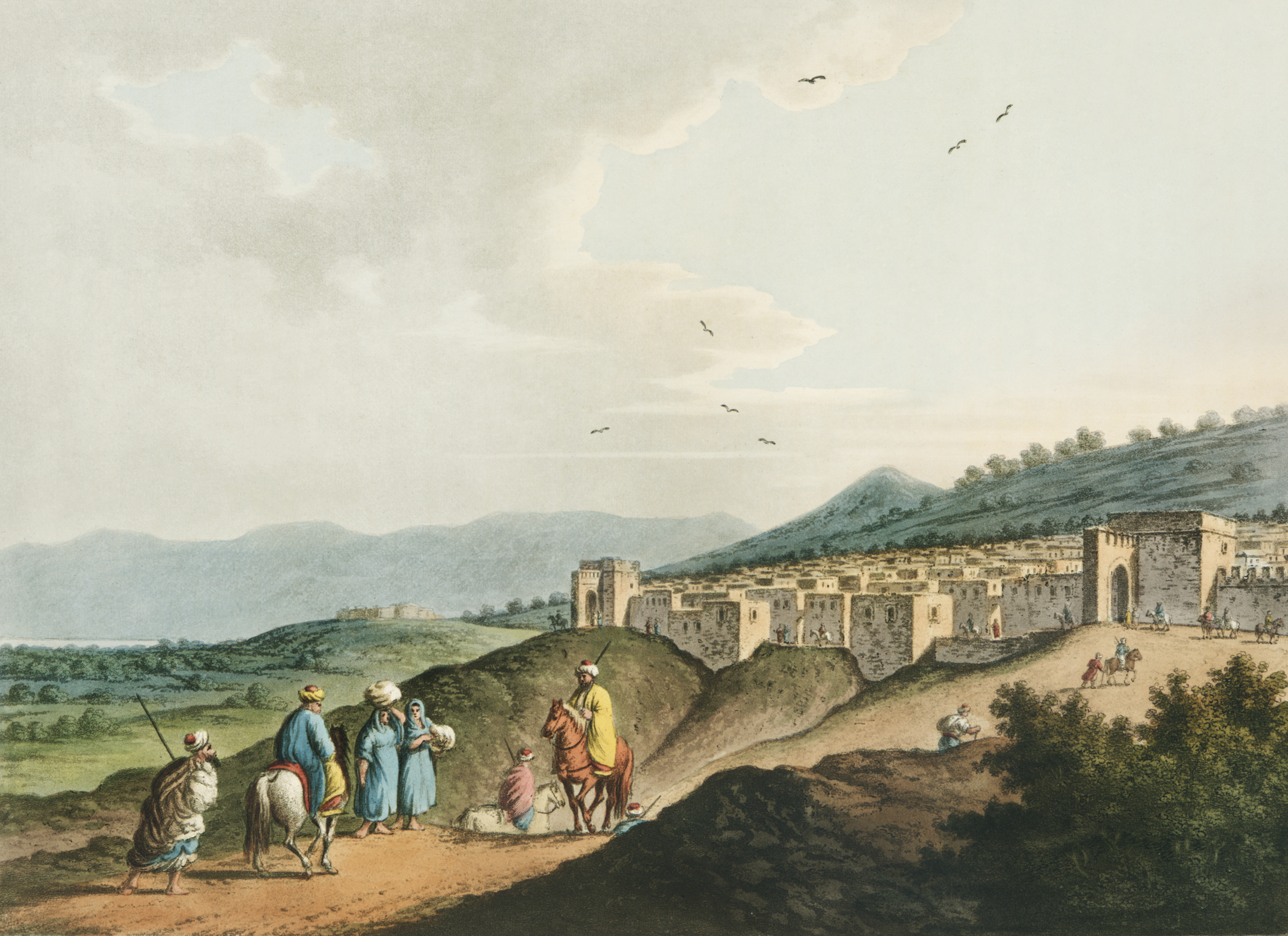
Town of Bethlehem, from Views in the Ottoman Dominions, in Europe, in Asia, and some of the Mediterranean islands (1810) illustrated by Luigi Mayer.

Abdullah Pasha, groomed by Farhi for leadership, succeeded Sulayman in 1820 nine months after the latter's death in 1819. Ottoman hesitation to appoint Abdullah was mitigated after persistent lobbying and bribery of Ottoman imperial officials by Farhi. Unlike Jazzar's mamluks who sought the governorship, Farhi did not view his protégé Abdullah to be a threat to his influence. Nonetheless, Abdullah had Farhi executed less than a year into his rule as the result of a power struggle. Abdullah more or less continued his predecessor's alliance with Emir Bashir Shihab II of Mount Lebanon and together they confronted the Wali of Damascus. The Ottoman authorities, instigated by Farhi's relatives, attempted to oust Abdullah in a siege against Acre, but Muhammad Ali, Wali of Egypt, persuaded the Ottomans to keep Abdullah as governor. In 1830, the Sidon Eyalet was assigned the sanjaks of Nablus, Jerusalem and Hebron, thereby bringing all of Palestine under a single province. That year, the Jarrars led a revolt against Abdullah, who thereafter besieged and destroyed Sanur's fortress, which had successfully resisted sieges by his predecessors. Abdullah's rule was marked by declining revenues from the cotton trade, efforts to reassert Acre's monopolies and poverty in Palestine. Nonetheless, Acre under Abdullah remained the principal force in Ottoman Syria due to instability in Damascus and the Ottomans' preoccupation with the war in Greece.

== Egyptian interregnum ==
In October 1831, Muhammad Ali of Egypt dispatched his modernized army commanded by his son Ibrahim Pasha in a campaign to annex Ottoman Syria, including Palestine. Ibrahim Pasha's forces had previously defeated the Ottomans and gained control of Sudan and the western Arabian Peninsula. Their entry into Palestine was not resisted by the local inhabitants, nor by the rural sheikhs of the central highlands. However, Abdullah Pasha resisted the conquest from Acre, which was besieged and ultimately surrendered in May 1832.

Egyptian rule brought on major political and administrative reforms to Palestine and Ottoman Syria in general, and represented a radical change from the semi-autonomous rule that existed in the region prior to Muhammad Ali's conquest. Among the significant measures established by Ibrahim Pasha to bring all of Syria under a single administration was the introduction of the advisory councils whose purpose was to standardize the diverse political configurations of Syria. The councils, based in the major cities, were composed of religious leaders, wealthy merchants and urban leaders, and functioned as administrative centers. In effect, they solidified urban control and economic domination of the hinterland, according to historian Beshara Doumani. Ibrahim Pasha also instituted the disarmament and conscription of the peasantry, a policy carried out by Muhammad Ali in Egypt to establish centralized rule and a modern army.

Conscription and disarmament were highly unpopular among the peasantry and their leaders, who refused to implement the orders. New taxation policies also threatened the role of urban notables and rural sheikhs as mutasallims, while Egypt's effective law enforcement measures threatened the livelihood of Bedouin tribes who derived their income from extorting merchants and travelers. The diverse array of social and political groups hostile to Egyptian reforms throughout Palestine developed into a coalition. Consequently, this coalition launched what became known as the Peasants' Revolt in 1834. The core of the rebels were based in Jabal Nablus and led by subdistrict chief Qasim al-Ahmad, who had previously contributed peasant irregulars to Ibrahim Pasha's forces during the conquest of Syria. The revolt represented a major threat to the flow of arms and conscripts between Egypt and Syria and to Muhammad Ali's program of modernizing Egypt. Rebel forces captured most of Palestine, including Jerusalem, by June. However, Muhammad Ali arrived in Palestine, opened negotiations with various rebel leaders and sympathizers, and secured a truce in July. He also managed to secure the defection of the powerful Abu Ghosh clan of Jerusalem's hinterland from the rebel forces.

During the truce period, numerous religious and political leaders from Jerusalem and other cities were either arrested, exiled or executed. Afterward, Qasim recommenced the rebellion, viewing the truce as a ruse. Egyptian forces launched a campaign to defeat the rebels in Jabal Nablus, destroying 16 villages before capturing Nablus itself on 15 July. Qasim was pursued to Hebron, which was leveled in August, and was later captured and executed with most of the rebel leadership. In the wake of Egypt's victory, the virtual autonomy of Jabal Nablus was significantly weakened, the conscription orders were carried out with 10,000 peasant conscripts sent to Egypt, and the population was largely disarmed. The latter measure effectively introduced a monopoly of violence in Palestine, as part of Egypt's centralization policies. Egyptian rule and the defeat of the powerful rural sheikhs of Jabal Nablus led to the political elevation of the Abd al-Hadi family of Arraba. Its sheikh, Husayn Abd al-Hadi, supported Ibrahim Pasha during the revolt and was promoted as the Wali of Sidon, which included all of Palestine. His relatives and allies were appointed the mutasallims of Jerusalem, Nablus and Jaffa.

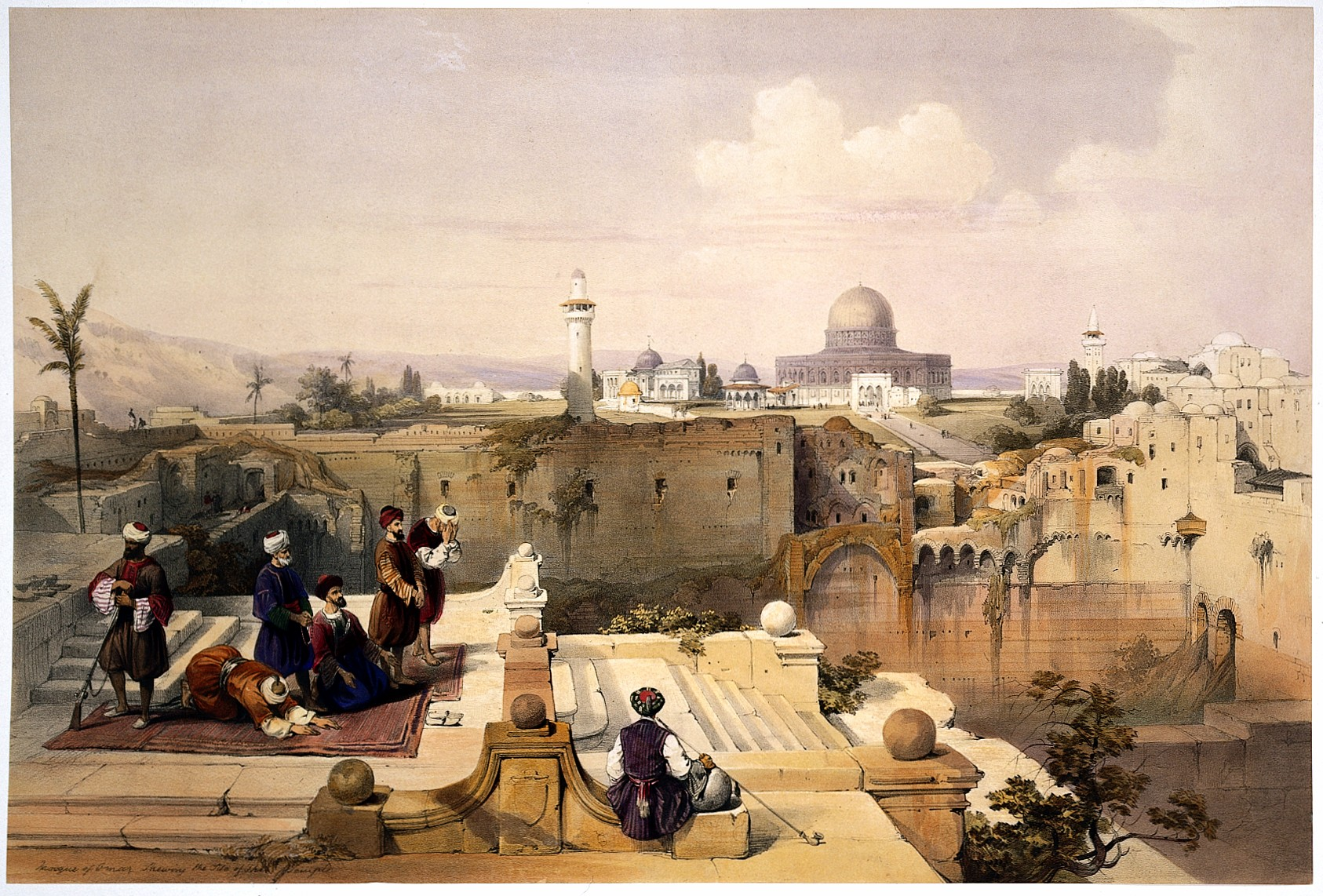
Painting of Jerusalem by David Roberts, 1839, in The Holy Land, Syria, Idumea, Arabia, Egypt, and Nubia

Britain sent the navy to shell Beirut and an Anglo-Ottoman expeditionary force landed, causing local uprisings against the Egyptian occupiers. A British naval squadron anchored off Alexandria. The Egyptian army retreated to Egypt. Muhammad Ali signed the Treaty of 1841. Britain returned control of the Levant to the Ottomans, and as a result was able to increase the extraterritorial rights that various European nations had enjoyed throughout previous centuries under the terms of the Capitulations of the Ottoman Empire. One American diplomat wrote that "Extraordinary privileges and immunities had become so embodied in successive treaties between the great Christian Powers and the Sublime Porte that for most intents and purposes many nationalities in the Ottoman Empire formed a state within the state."

== Resumption of Ottoman rule ==
=== Aqil Agha period ===
Starting in the 1830s, Aqil Agha, a Palestinian bedouin who was a defector from Ibrahim Pasha's army, began assembling a militant group which had him becoming an influential man in Northern Palestine. His rise and meddling in Palestine angered the Ottoman appointed kaimakam of Acre, Muhammad Kubrisi, which ultimately resulted in Aqil leaving to east of Jordan river into modern day Jordan in search of allies. There, Aqil would meet Emir Fendi Al-Fayez of the Bani Sakher, the most powerful tribe in Jordan and one which frequently contested with the Ottomans, Emir Fendi had both the army of 4500 men and funds to support Aqil against Kubrisi. Aqil would meet Al-Fayez in several secretive meetings, and an alliance was struck between them, where Aqil became a vassal of the Al-Fayez as their Emirate has vassalized the local Arabs such as Al-Karak with the Majali and Al-Tafilah with Al-Huara and the Bani Hamidah earlier. In 1847, Aqil's raids with the support of the Bani Sakher had Kubrisi inviting him back to the Galilee and had him pardoned. His influence over the Galilee would only grow where his rule resembled Daher al-Umar's until the Tanzimat of 1862. After the Tanzimat, his role became less autonomous of the Ottomans, ending the last local obstacle to Ottoman centralization in Palestine.

In common usage from 1840 onward, "Palestine" was used both to describe the consular jurisdictions of the Western powers or for a region that extended in the north–south direction typically from Rafah (south-east of Gaza) to the Litani River (now in Lebanon). The western boundary was the sea, and the eastern boundary was the poorly defined place where the Syrian desert began. In various European sources, the eastern boundary was placed anywhere from the Jordan River to slightly east of Amman. The Negev Desert was not included.

=== Centralization ===
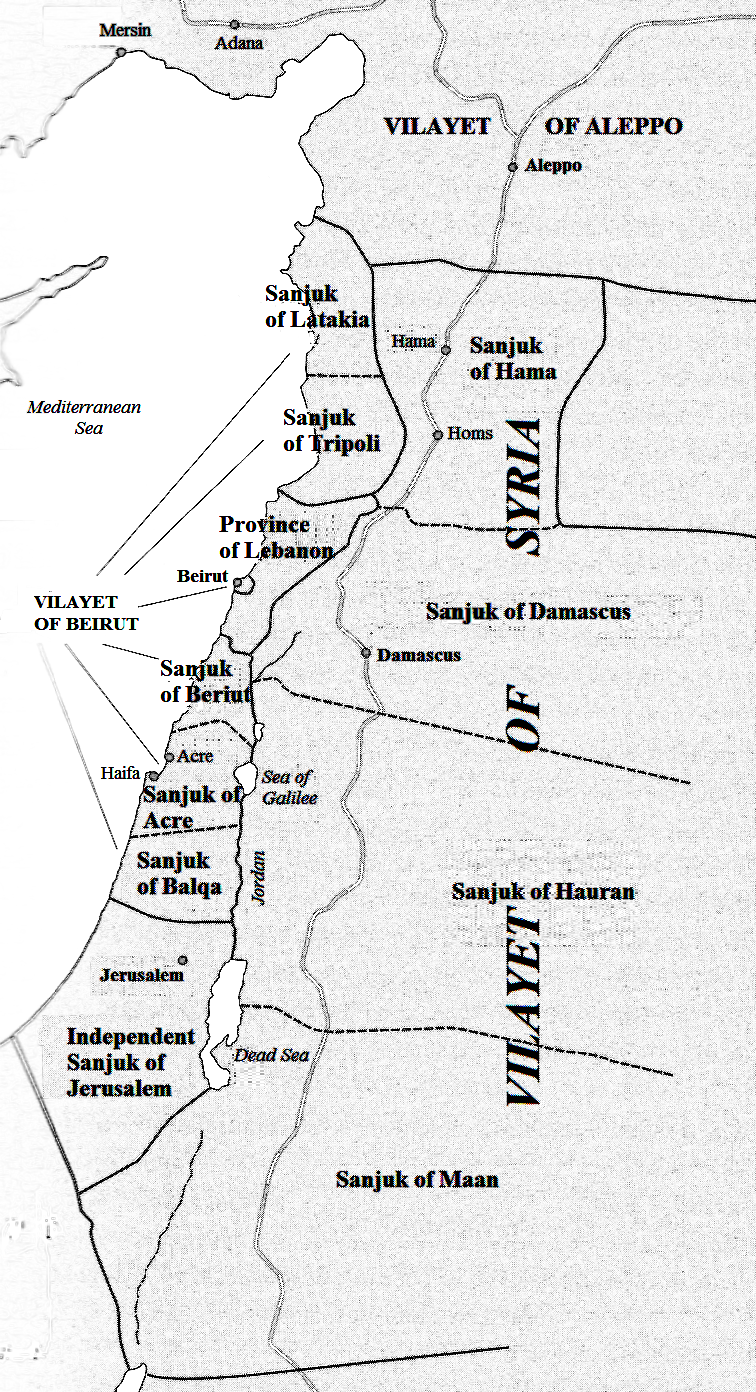
"Independent" Vilayet of Jerusalem shown within Ottoman administrative divisions in the Eastern Mediterranean coast after the reorganisation of 1887–88

The Western Consuls were originally magistrates who tried cases involving their own citizens in foreign territories, as the Ottomans perpetuated the legal system they inherited from the Byzantine Empire, whereby the law in many matters was personal, not territorial, and the individual citizen carried his nation's law with him wherever he went. Capitulatory law applied to foreigners in Palestine. Only Consular Courts of the State of the foreigners concerned were competent to try them, and not only in cases involving personal status, but also in criminal and commercial matters. According to American Ambassador Morgenthau, Turkey had never been an independent sovereignty. The Western Powers had their own courts, marshals, colonies, schools, postal systems, religious institutions, and prisons. The Consuls also extended protections to large communities of Jewish protégés who had settled in Palestine.

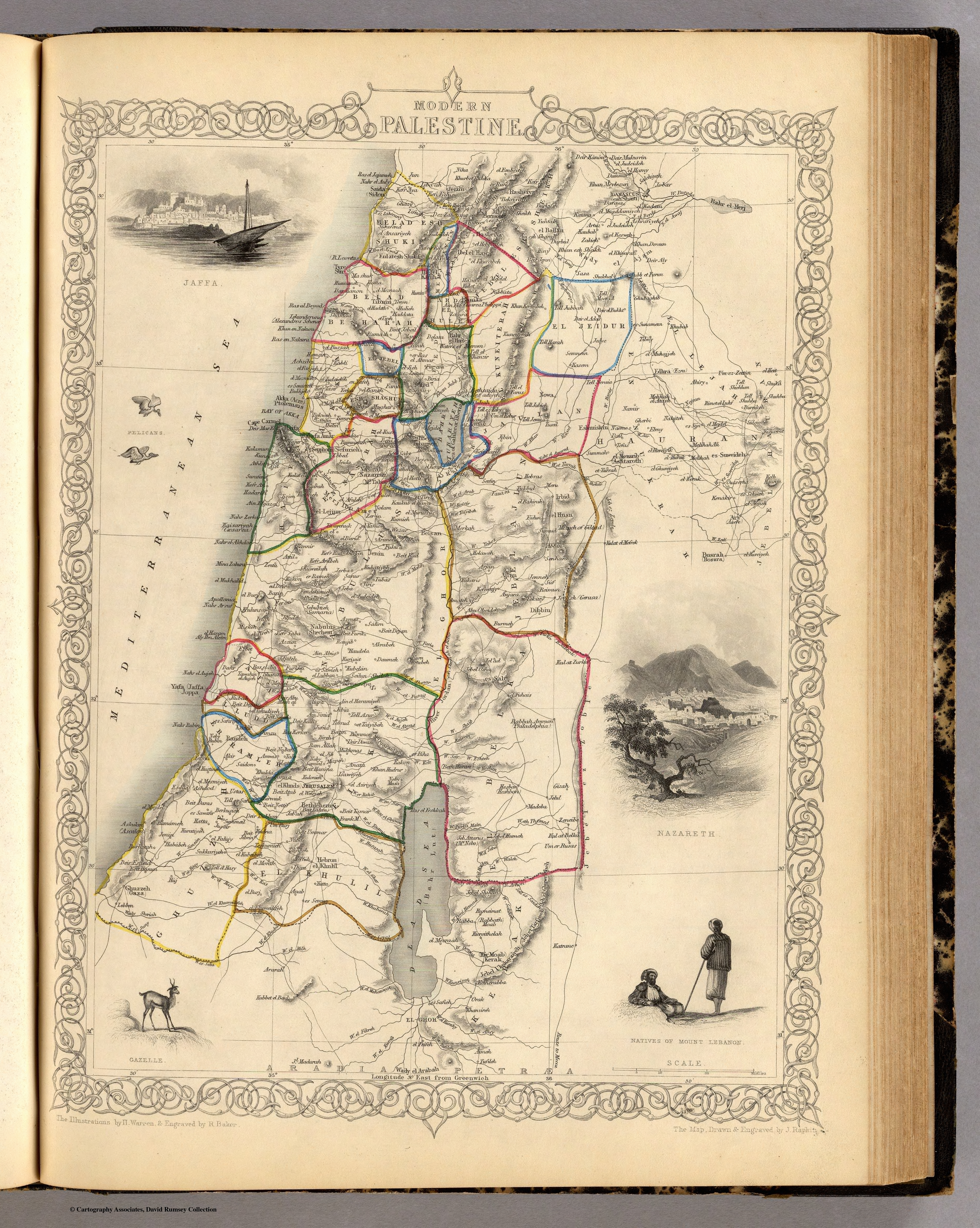
Map of "Palestine" in 1851, showing the Kaza subdivisions. At the time, the region shown was split between the Sidon Eyalet and the Damascus Eyalet

The Muslim, Christian, and Jewish communities of Palestine were allowed to exercise jurisdiction over their own members according to charters granted to them. For centuries the Jews and Christians had enjoyed a large degree of communal autonomy in matters of worship, jurisdiction over personal status, taxes, and in managing their schools and charitable institutions. In the 19th century those rights were formally recognized as part of the Tanzimat reforms.

In the 1860s, the Ottoman military was able to restore order east of the Jordan river by halting tribal conflicts and Bedouin raids. This invited migration, most notably to the Salt area, from various populations in Lebanon, Syria and Palestine to access new lands. This influx amounted to some 12,000 over the period from 1880 to just before the First World War, while the Bedouin population east of the Jordan increased to 56,000. However, with the creation of the Transjordanian emirate in 1921–22, the hamlet of Amman, which had been recently resettled by Circassians, attracted most of the new immigrants from Palestine, and many of those that had previously moved to Salt.

In the reorganisation of 1873, which established the administrative boundaries that remained in place until 1914, Palestine was split between three major administrative units. The northern part, above a line connecting Jaffa to north Jericho and the Jordan, was assigned to the vilayet of Beirut, subdivided into the sanjaks (districts) of Acre, Beirut and Nablus. The southern part, from Jaffa downwards, was part of the Mutasarrifate of Jerusalem, a special district under the direct authority of Istanbul. Its southern boundaries were unclear but petered out in the eastern Sinai Peninsula and northern Negev Desert. Most of the central and southern Negev was assigned to the vilayet of Hejaz, which also included the Sinai Peninsula and the western part of Arabia.

This period saw a revival of agriculture in rural Palestine. In the southern coastal plain, villagers expanded cultivation into the sandy dunefields (''rimāl'') using sunken gardens known as ''mawāṣī'', which supported vines, figs, and vegetables during the Late Ottoman and British Mandate periods.

The Ottomans regarded "Filistin" as an abstract term referring to the "Holy Land", and not one consistently applied to a clearly defined area. Among the educated Arab public, Filastin was a common concept, referring either to the whole of Palestine or to the Jerusalem sanjak alone or just to the area around Ramle. (Note: Haim Gerber (1998) referring to fatwas by two Hanafite Syrian jurists.) The publication of the daily paper Falastin (Palestine) from 1911 was one example of the increasing currency of this concept.

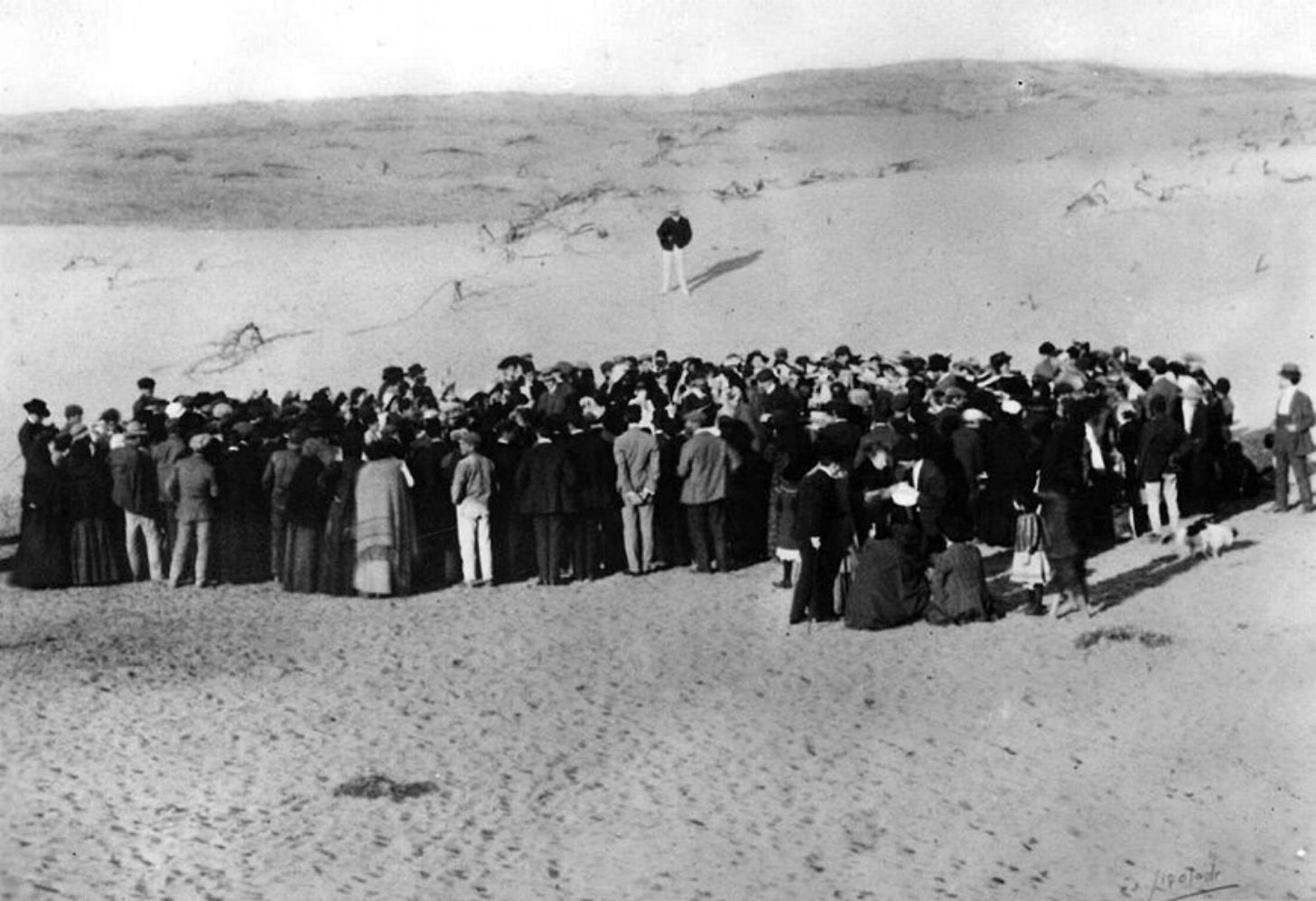
Tel Aviv was founded on land purchased from Bedouins north of Jaffa. This is the 1909 drawing of lots for the distribution of construction plots.

The rise of Zionism began in Europe in the 19th century, seeking to establish a Jewish state in Palestine, perceived by its adherents as the original homeland of the Jewish people. The end of the 19th century saw the beginning of Zionist immigration. The "First Aliyah" was the first modern widespread wave of Jewish migration to Palestine coming mostly from Eastern Europe and from Yemen, beginning in 1881–82 and lasting until 1903, bringing an estimated 25,000 Jews. In 1891, a group of Jerusalem notables sent a petition to the central Ottoman government in Istanbul calling for the cessation of Jewish immigration, and land sales to Jews. The "Second Aliyah" took place between 1904 and 1914, during which approximately 35,000 Jews immigrated, mostly from Russia and Poland.

== Great War and end of Ottoman rule ==
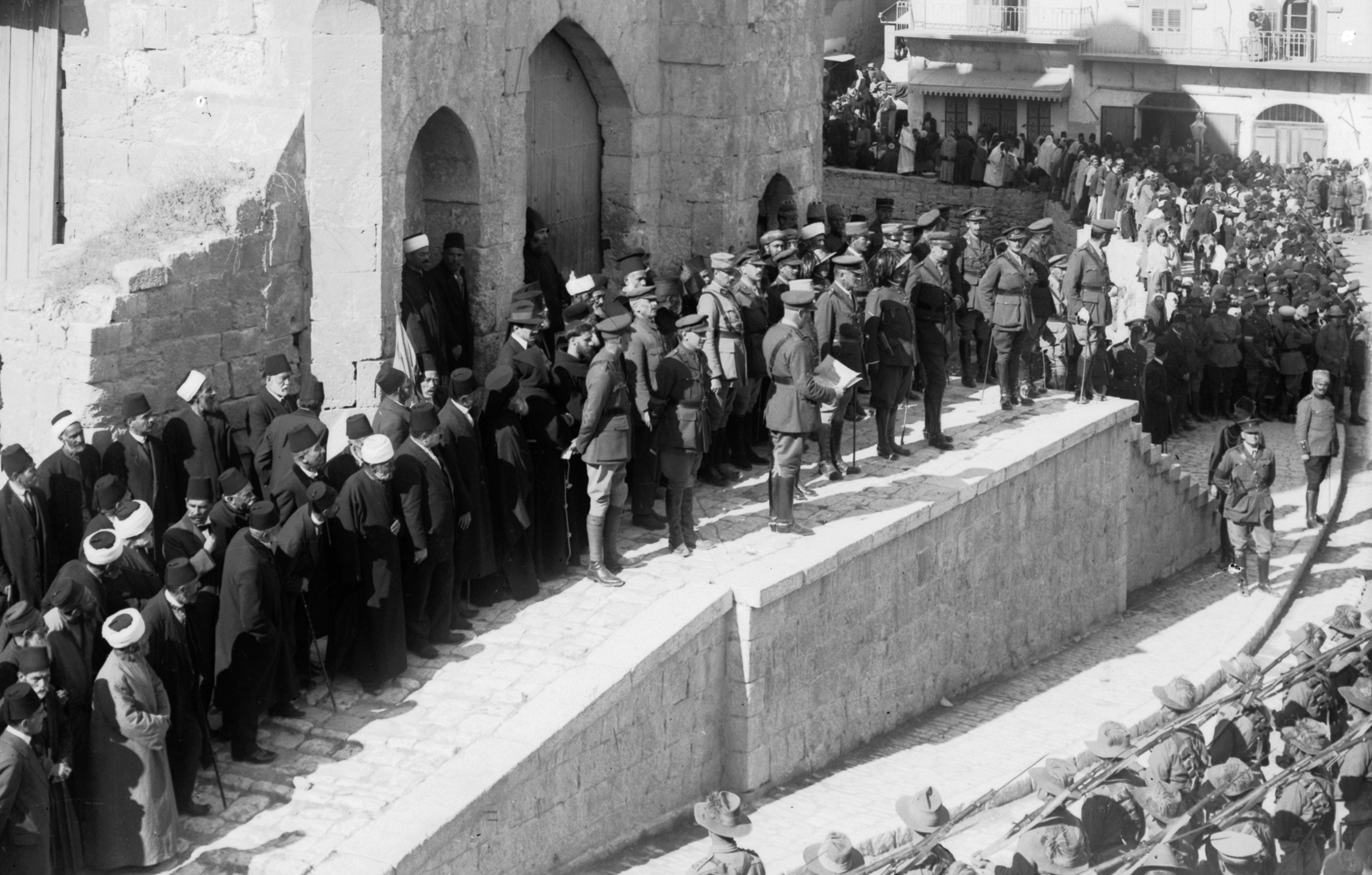
General Edmund Allenby entering Jerusalem, 11 December 1917

During World War I the Ottomans sided with the German Empire and the Central Powers. As a result, they were driven from much of the region by the British Empire during the dissolution phase of the Ottoman Empire.

Under the secret Sykes–Picot Agreement of 1916, it was envisioned that most of Palestine, when conquered from the Ottoman Empire, would become an international zone not under direct French or British colonial control. Shortly thereafter, British foreign minister Arthur Balfour issued the Balfour Declaration, which promised to establish a "Jewish national home" in Palestine, but appeared to contradict the 1915–16 Hussein-McMahon Correspondence, which contained an undertaking to form a united Arab state in exchange for the Great Arab Revolt against the Ottoman Empire in World War I. McMahon's promises could have been seen by Arab nationalists as a pledge of immediate Arab independence, an undertaking violated by the region's subsequent partition into British and French League of Nations mandates under the secret Sykes-Picot Agreement of May 1916, which became the real cornerstone of the geopolitics structuring the entire region. The Balfour Declaration, likewise, was seen by Jewish nationalists as the cornerstone of a future Jewish homeland.

The British Egyptian Expeditionary Force, commanded by Edmund Allenby, captured Jerusalem on 9 December 1917 and occupied the whole of the Levant following the defeat of Turkish forces in Palestine at the Battle of Megiddo in September 1918 and the capitulation of Turkey on 31 October. (Note: See also Third Battle of Gaza and Battle of Beersheba)

== See also ==
- Old Yishuv
- Ottoman Syria
- Southern Syria
- Sanur Citadel

== Bibliography ==
- Bedjaoui, Mohammed, ed. (1991). International law: achievements and prospects. Paris and Dordrecht/Boston/London: UNESCO and Martinus Nijhoff Publishers. ISBN 92-3-102716-6.
- Ben-Ghedalia, Yochai (2009). "The Habsburgs and the Jewish Philanthropy in Jerusalem during the Crimean War (1853–6)" (PDF). Jerusalem: The Hebrew University of Jerusalem. Archived from the original (PDF) on 5 September 2012.
- Bentwich, Norman (1923). "The Abrogation of the Turkish Capitulations". Journal of Comparative Legislation and International Law. Third Series. 5 (4): 182–188. JSTOR 752966. Archived from the original on 19 December 2023.
- Biger, Gideon (1981). "Where was Palestine? Pre-World War I perception". Area. 13 (2): 153–160.
- Biger, Gideon (2004). The Boundaries of Modern Palestine, 1840–1947. Routledge. pp. 13–15. ISBN 0-7146-5654-2.
- Doumani, Beshara (1995). Rediscovering Palestine: Merchants and Peasants in Jabal Nablus, 1700–1900. University of California Press. ISBN 978-0-520-08895-5.
- The London Magazine, and Monthly Chronologer. Edward Ekshaw. 174.
- Filiu, Jean-Pierre (2014). Gaza: A History. Oxford University Press. ISBN 978-0-19-020189-0. Archived from the original on 17 April 2023.
- Fuller, Thomas (1639). The Historie of the Holy Warre. Thomas Buck. Archived from the original on 19 December 2023.
- Gerber, Haim (1998). "'Palestine' and other Territorial Concepts in the 17th Century". International Journal of Middle East Studies. 30 (4): 563–572. doi:10.1017/s0020743800052569. S2CID 162982234.
- Gershoni, I. (1997). Rethinking Nationalism in the Arab Middle East. Columbia University Press. ISBN 978-0-231-10695-5.
- Herold, J. Christopher (2009). Bonaparte in Egypt. Fireship Press. ISBN 978-1-934757-76-5. Archived from the original on 19 December 2023.
- Hughes, Ian (2020). A Military Life of Constantine the Great. Pen and Sword Military. ISBN 978-1-5267-2426-7. Archived from the original on 3 July 2024.
- Izzeddin, Nejla M. Abu (1993). The Druzes: A New Study of Their History, Faith, and Society. Brill. ISBN 90-04-09705-8. Archived from the original on 19 December 2023.
- "New Aliyah – Modern Zionist Aliyot (1882–1948)". Jewish Agency for Israel. n.d. Archived from the original on 23 June 2009.
- Joudah, Ahmad Hasan (1987). Revolt in Palestine in the Eighteenth Century: The Era of Shaykh Zahir Al-ʻUmar. Kingston Press. ISBN 978-0-940670-11-2. Archived from the original on 19 December 2023.
- Kark, Ruth (1994). American Consuls in the Holy Land, 1832–1914. Wayne State University Press. ISBN 0-8143-2523-8. Archived from the original on 19 December 2023.
- Krämer, Gudrun (2011). A History of Palestine: From the Ottoman Conquest to the Founding of the State of Israel. Princeton University Press. ISBN 978-0-691-15007-9.
- Kimmerling, Baruch (n.d.). "Benny Morris's Shocking Interview". History News Network. Archived from the original on 30 March 2019. "they officially accepted the partition plan, but invested all their efforts towards improving its terms and maximally expanding their boundaries while reducing the number of Arabs in them."
- Labat, Jean Baptiste (1735). Mémoires du Chevalier d'Arvieux (in French). Charles Jean Baptiste Delespinec. Archived from the original on 19 December 2023.
- Levy, Avigdor, ed. (2003). Jews, Turks, Ottomans. Syracuse University Press. ISBN 0-8156-2941-9.
- Lewis, Bernard (1980). "Palestine: On the History and Geography of a Name". The International History Review. 2 (1): 1–12. doi:10.1080/07075332.1980.9640202.
- Mandel, Neville (1976). The Arabs and Zionism before World War I. Berkeley: University of California Press. p. xviii.
- Mattar, Phillip (2005). Encyclopedia of the Palestinians. Facts on File. ISBN 978-0-8160-6986-6.
- McGregor, Andrew James (2006). A Military History of Modern Egypt: From the Ottoman Conquest to the Ramadan War. Greenwood Publishing Group. ISBN 978-0-275-98601-8.
- Milner, John (1688). A Collection of the Church-history of Palestine: From Birth of Christ. Dring. Archived from the original on 19 December 2023.
- Mishaqah, Mikha'il (1988). Thackston, William McIntosh (ed.). Murder, Mayhem, Pillage, and Plunder: The History of the Lebanon in the 18th and 19th Centuries by Mikhayil Mishaqa (1800–1873). Translated by W. M. Thackston, Jr. SUNY Press. ISBN 978-0-88706-712-9.
- "The Second Aliyah (1904–1914)". Ministry of Aliyah and Integration. 2 December 2020. Archived from the original on 13 June 2022.
- Morgenthau, Henry (2009). Ambassador Morgenthau's Story: Chapter X. Cornell University Library. ISBN 978-1-112-30638-9. Archived from the original on 24 September 2012.
- Palva, Heikki (2004). "Negations in the Dialect of es-Salt, Jordan". In Haak, Martine; de Jong, Rudolf; Versteegh, Kees (eds.). Approaches to Arabic Dialects: A Collection of Articles Presented to Manfred Woidich on the Occasion of his Sixtieth Birthday. Brill. ISBN 978-90-04-13206-1.
- Philipp, Thomas (1998). The Syrian Land: Processes of Integration and Fragmentation: Bilād Al-Shām from the 18th to the 20th Century. Franz Steiner Verlag. ISBN 978-3-515-07309-7. Archived from the original on 19 December 2023.
- Philipp, Thomas (2013). Acre: The Rise and Fall of a Palestinian City, 1730–1831. Columbia University Press. ISBN 978-0-231-50603-8. Archived from the original on 19 December 2023.
- Porath, Yehoshua (1974). The Emergence of the Palestinian-Arab National Movement, 1918–1929. Cass. ISBN 0-7146-2939-1.
- Porath, Zipporah (2015) [1987]. Letters from Jerusalem, 1947–1948. Jerusalem: Association of Americans and Canadians in Israel. p. 26. ISBN 978-965-91987-2-6.
- Rosen-Ayalon, Myriam (1998). "Between Cairo and Damascus: Rural Life and Urban Economics in the Holy Land During the Ayyuid, Maluk and Ottoman Periods". In Levy, Thomas Evan (ed.). The Archaeology of Society in the Holy Land. Leicester University Press. ISBN 978-0-7185-0165-5.
- Salmon, Thomas (1744). Modern History, Or, The Present State of All Nations: Describing Their Respective Situations, Persons, Habits, and Buildings, Manners, Laws and Customs ... Plants, Animals, and Minerals. Vol. 1. London: Printed for T. Longman. T. Osborne. J. Shuckburgh. C. Hitch. S. Austen. And J. Rivington. Archived from the original on 18 February 2023.
- Schölch, Alexander (1986). "Was There a Feudal System in Ottoman Lebanon and Palestine?". In Kushner, David (ed.). Palestine in the Late Ottoman Period: Political, Social, and Economic Transformation. Jerusalem; Leiden: Yad Izhak Ben-Zvi Press / E.J. Brill. pp. 130–145. ISBN 90-04-07792-8.
- Sharon, Moshe (2009). Handbook of Oriental Studies: The Near and Middle East. Corpus inscriptionum Arabicarum Palaestinae. Leiden; Boston: Brill. ISBN 978-90-04-17085-8. Archived from the original on 19 December 2023.
- Scharfstein, Sol (1997). Chronicle of Jewish History: From the Patriarchs to the 21st Century. Ktav Publishing House. ISBN 0-88125-545-9.
- Shahin, Mariam (2005). Palestine: A Guide. Interlink Books. ISBN 1-56656-557-X.
- Shehadeh, Raja (1997). From Occupation to Interim Accords: Israel and the Palestinian Territories. Kluwer Law International. ISBN 978-90-411-0618-6.
- Shṿartsfuḳs, Shimʿon; Schwarzfuchs, Simon (1979). Napoleon, the Jews, and the Sanhedrin. Routledge & Kegan Paul. ISBN 978-0-7100-8955-7.
- Sluglett, Peter, ed. (2014). The Urban Social History of the Middle East, 1750–1950. Syracuse University Press. ISBN 978-0-8156-5063-8. Archived from the original on 19 December 2023.
- Strawson, John (2010). Partitioning Palestine: Legal Fundamentalism in the Palestinian-Israeli Conflict. Pluto Press. ISBN 978-0-7453-2324-4.
- Thayer, Lucius Ellsworth (April 1923). "The Capitulations of the Ottoman Empire and the Question of their Abrogation as it Affects the United States". The American Journal of International Law. 17 (2): 207–233. doi:10.2307/2188106. JSTOR 2188106. S2CID 147139601.
- Thomas, Baylis (1999). How Israel was Won: A Concise History of the Arab-Israeli Conflict. Lexington Books. ISBN 978-0-7391-0064-6.
- Tsimhoni, Daphne (1993). Christian Communities in Jerusalem and the West Bank since 1948. Praeger. ISBN 0-275-93921-9.
- Yazbak, Mahmoud (1998). Haifa in the Late Ottoman Period, A Muslim Town in Transition, 1864–1914. Brill. ISBN 90-04-11051-8. Archived from the original on 17 April 2023.
- Ze'evi, Dror (1996). An Ottoman Century: The District of Jerusalem in the 1600s. SUNY Press. ISBN 0-7914-2915-6.
