= Yisroel ben Shmuel of Shklov =

Lithuanian rabbi (1770–1839)

Yisroel ben Shmuel Ashkenazi of Shklov (Hebrew: ישראל משקלוב; c. 1770 – May 22, 1839) was a Lithuanian Jewish Talmudist, one of a group of Talmudical scholars of Shklov, He was among "the last arrivals drawn to Vilna by the Vilna Gaon (1720–1797; Rabbi Elijah ben Solomon Zalman). He served the Gaon for nearly a year, and helped organize some of his teachings for publication.

He was selected to arrange publication the Gaon's commentary to the first two parts of the Shulchan Aruch. That on the Orach Chaim was published in Shklov in 1803. Ashkenazi published Mishnas Eliyahu and Hagahos Ha'gra, a series of commentaries from the Vilna Gaon on tractate Shekalim of the Jerusalem Talmud, along with Tiklin Chadtin, which included his own commentary on the tractate. These three texts have been incorporated into the Vilna Edition Shas version of tractate Shekalim.

Later moved to Ottoman Syria and became the head of the German and Polish congregations of Safed and then of Jerusalem, earning the appellation "Ashkenazi" by the Sephardim, who came originally from Spain or Portugal, to emphasize his Eastern European origins.

Several years after settling in Safed in 1810, Ashkenazi travelled to Lithuania and other parts of what was then Russian Empire to raise funds for the needs of the people and institutions of the Yishuv haYashan.

After his return, he wrote his magnum opus, Pe'at ha-Shulchan, which is intended as a supplement to the Shulchan Aruch, supplying details of agricultural laws obligatory only in the Holy Land, that had been omitted by rabbi Joseph Caro in his code, using material that had been codified by the Rambam with the addition of other early opinions and his own personal commentary. He also incorporated in this book the notes of the Vilna Gaon to the tractate Zera'im, the first order of the Mishnah, and gave in addition a voluminous commentary of his own which he called Beit Yisrael. The work was published in Safed in 1836 by the printing-house of Yisrael Bak.

During the month-long 1834 looting of Safed that started in mid-June, the Jewish community faced looting, rape and murder from their Arab and Druze neighbors. While in hiding from the rampage, Ashkenazi wrote letters to leaders of foreign nations based in Beirut who might be willing to take action to protect their citizens in Safed. Ibrahim Pasha of Egypt sent Bashir Shihab II, the Emir of Mount Lebanon, to suppress the revolt, and his arrival with his troops led to the end of the rioting by mid-July and the arrest and execution of perpetrators. Safed's Jewish community was devastated, with the destruction of ritual objects including torah scrolls, as well as of synagogues and of Bak's printing press, the area's only press for Hebrew publications; residents were only able to recover a tenth of the value of the property destroyed. Askenazi's friend and publisher, Israel Bak, wrote himself of the experience fighting to protect his workers and his printing business from the Arab mob, while being stabbed repeatedly in the foot, and left crippled and naked in the streets.

Ashkenazi is also the author of Nachalah u-Menuchah, a collection of responsa mentioned in the work above. An account of his rabbinate of Jerusalem is given in Mendel ben Aaron's Kore ha-'Ittim (Vilna, 1840). Ashkenazi died at Tiberias on May 22, 1839.
