= 1660 destruction of Safed =

Destruction of a Jewish community

The 1660 destruction of Safed occurred during the Druze power struggle in Mount Lebanon, at the time of the rule of Ottoman sultan Mehmed IV. The towns of Safed and nearby Tiberias, with substantial Jewish communities, were destroyed in the turmoil, a small Jewish community surviving in Safed, but Tiberias, a Jewish town at the time, losing almost its entire population. Only a few of the former residents of Safed returned to the town after the destruction. Gershom Scholem considers the 1662 reports about the destruction of Safed as "exaggerated". The community, however, recovered within several years, whereas Tiberias lay in waste for decades.

== Background ==
Safed's central role in Jewish life in Galilee declined after the late 16th century, when it had been a major city with a population of 15,000 Jews. By the second half of the 17th century Safed still had a majority Jewish community with 200 "houses" (multiple family units) and some 4,000 to 5,000 Jewish residents, while about 100 "houses" in the town were Muslim. The district was under control of Druze emirs from the Maan family until 1660, when the Ottomans sought to regain local control by reorganizing the sanjaks of Safed and Sidon-Beirut into the province of Sidon. From the 1658 death of Emir Mulhim Ma'n to 1667, a struggle for power between his sons and other Ottoman-backed Druze rulers took place in the region. Mulhim's son Ahmad Maʿn emerged victorious among the Druze, but the Maʿnīs lost control of the area and retreated to the Shuf mountains and Kisrawan. In the 2nd half of the 17th century, Safed became the capital of the Ottoman sanjak of the same name.

== Destruction and displacement ==
Adler, Franco and Mendelssohn claim that the destruction of Safed took place in 1660, Mendelssohn writing that the Jews of Safed "had suffered severely" when the city had been destroyed by the Arabs. Gershom Scholem places the attack in 1662, and Rappel writes that by 1662 both Safed and Tiberias were destroyed, with only a few of former Safed's Jewish residents to return to the town. A publication by the General Council of the Jewish Community of Eretz Yisrael states that the Druze raided and destroyed both Safed and Tiberias in 1662, "and the inhabitants fled to the adjacent villages, to Sidon or to Jerusalem".

Rosanes brings an account of Safed's Jewish community "utter destruction" in his book "History of the Jews in Turkish realm". However, Scholem writes that the reports of the "utter destruction" of the Jewish community in Safed in this time period "seem greatly exaggerated, and the conclusions based on them are false." He points out that Sabbatai Sevi's mystical movement was active in Safed in 1665. Scholem also attributes to the French trader Laurent d'Arvieux who visited Safed in 1660 an understanding of "the religious factor which enabled the community to survive," a belief "'that the Messiah who will be born in Galilee, will make Safed the capital of his new kingdom on earth'" Scholem writes that there was definitely a Jewish community in Safed in 1664–1667.

== Aftermath ==
Only a few of the former residents of Safed had returned to the town after the destruction. Altogether, the town's Jewish community kept existing despite the events, with Barnai saying that "in the second half of the 17th century the Jewish presence in Palestine dwindled, and the Jewish presence in the Galilee also shrank. Only in Safed was there a small community."

== See also ==
- Ottoman Syria
- Timeline of Jewish History
- 1517 Safed pogrom
- 1834 Safed Plunder
- 1838 Druze attack on Safed
