= Safed Hebrew printing press (1577–1587) =

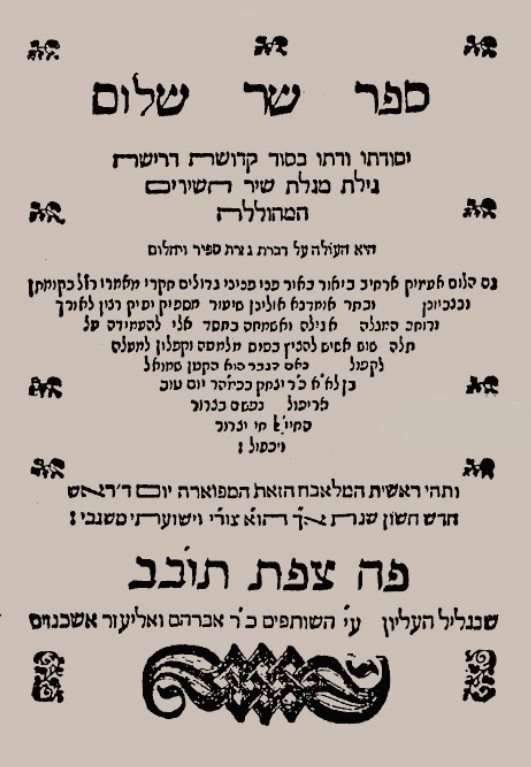
Title page of Sar Shalom, printed in Safed in 1579.

The first printing press in the Middle East was established in 1577 in the city of Safed by Eliezer ben Isaac Ashkenazi and his son Isaac. Originally from Prague, they had spent time in Lublin and Constantinople before making aliyah, possibly to fulfill the mitzvah of living in the Land of Israel. The press was established in Safed and in partnership with a local Jew named Abraham ben Isaac Ashkenazi, who funded the project.

Printing was interrupted in 1579 when Abraham ben Isaac departed for Yemen as an emissary of the Tiberias yeshiva, while Eliezer returned to Constantinople, where he printed another book in 1586. Upon Eliezer's return in 1587, the press issued three more books. The press closed following Eliezer Ashkenazi's death around 1588, possibly due to an epidemic. Hebrew printing would not return to the land until 1832, when Yisrael Bak founded another printing press in Safed.

== Publications ==
The printing press produced six books.

- September 1577: Lekach Tov (Good Instruction), a commentary on the Book of Esther by Yom Tov Tzahalon, who later served as an emissary for the Jewish community of Safed.
- August 1578: Kohelet Yaakov (The Congregation of Jacob), a Kabbalistic commentary on Ecclesiastes by Moshe ben Mordechai Galante.
- 1579: Sar Shalom (Prince of Peace), a commentary on the Song of Songs by Samuel ben Isaac Aripul.
- 14 March 1587: Zemirot Israel (The Songs of Israel), a collection of religious poetry by Israel ben Moses Najara.
- 22 March 1587: Mesacheket BaTevel (Rejoicing in the World), an ethical work by Israel ben Moses Najara.
- 1587: Baraita de-Rabbi Eliezer, published together with Midrash Agur.
