= 1660 destruction of Tiberias =

Destruction of a Jewish community by Lebanese Druze

The 1660 destruction of Tiberias occurred during the Druze power struggle in the Galilee, in the same year as the destruction of Safed. The destruction of Tiberias by the Druze resulted in abandonment of the city by its Jewish community, until it was rebuilt by Zahir al-Umar in early 18th century. Altshuler however attributes the destruction of Tiberias in 1660 to an earthquake. The destruction could have also been a combination of both events.

== Background ==
As the Ottoman Empire expanded along the southern Mediterranean coast under sultan Selim I, the Catholic Monarchs began establishing Inquisition commissions. Many Conversos, (Marranos and Moriscos) and Sephardic Jews fled to the Ottoman provinces, settling at first in Constantinople, Salonika, Sarajevo, Sofia and in Anatolia. The sultan encouraged them to settle in Palestine.

In 1558, a Portuguese-born marrano, Doña Gracia, was granted tax collecting rights in Tiberias and its surrounding villages by Suleiman the Magnificent. She envisaged the town becoming a refuge for Jews and obtained a permit to establish Jewish autonomy there. In 1561 her nephew Joseph Nasi, the sultan-appointed lord of Tiberias, encouraged Jews to settle in Tiberias. Securing a firman from the sultan, he and Joseph ben Ardut or ibn Adret (converso name: Pomar), whom he sent to Tiberias, rebuilt the city walls and laid the groundwork for a textile (silk) industry, planting mulberry trees and urging craftsmen to move there. In 1624, when the sultan recognized Fakhr-al-Din II as lord of Arabistan (a specially created realm stretching from Aleppo to the borders of Egypt), the Druze leader made Tiberias his capital.

== Destruction ==
The destruction of Tiberias by the Druze resulted in the Jewish community fleeing entirely. Unlike Tiberias, which became desolate for many years, the nearby city of Safed recovered from its destruction by Druze in 1660 relatively quickly, not becoming entirely abandoned, remaining an important Jewish center in the Galilee.

== Aftermath ==
In the 1720s, Zahir al-Umar, a Bedouin ruler of Ottoman Galilee, fortified Tiberias and signed an agreement with the neighboring Bedouin tribes to prevent looting. Richard Pococke, who visited Tiberias in 1738, witnessed the building of a fort to the north of the city, and the strengthening of the old walls, attributing it to a dispute with the pasha (ruler) of Damascus. Under Zahir's patronage, Jewish families were encouraged to settle in Tiberias. He invited Chaim Abulafia of Smyrna to rebuild the Jewish community.

== See also ==
- History of the Jews and Judaism in the Land of Israel
