= 1834 looting of Safed =

Anti-Jewish violence in Palestine

Looting of Safed (1834)
- Part of the Arab Peasant Revolt
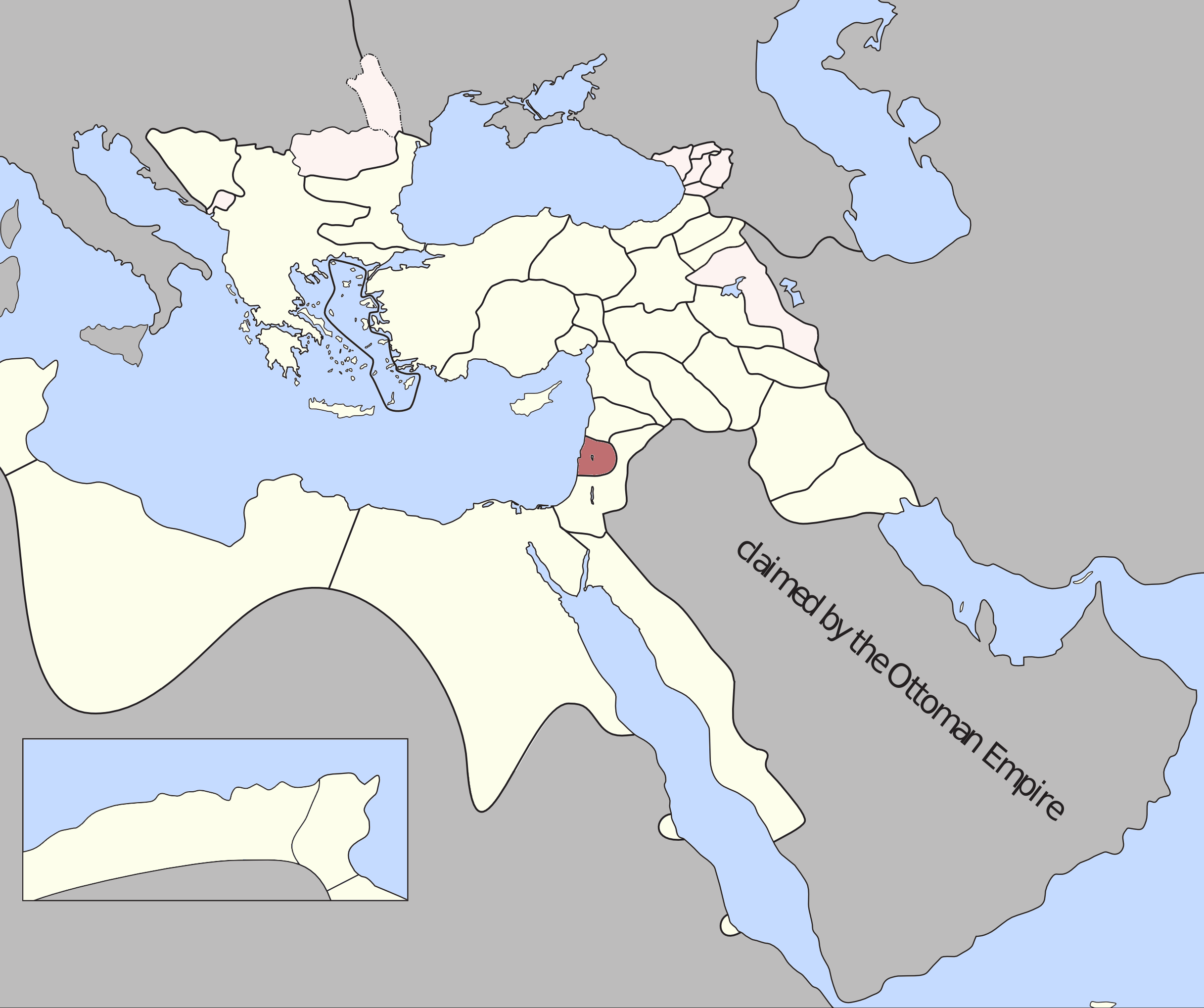
- Map of the Sidon Eyalet within the Ottoman Empire
- Native name: ביזת צפת בשנת תקצ"ד
- Location: 32°57′57″N 35°29′54″E; Safed, Ottoman Syria (now Israel)
- Date: 15 June 1834 – 17 July 1834 (1 month and 2 days)
- Target: Jews
- Attack type: Pogrom
- Perpetrators: Arabs and Druze

The 1834 looting of Safed Hebrew: ביזת צפת בשנת תקצ"ד (also known as the 1834 Safed pogrom) was a month-long attack on the Jewish community of Safed in the Sidon Eyalet of the Ottoman Empire during the Peasants' revolt in Palestine. It began on Sunday, June 15 (7 Sivan), the day after the Jewish holiday of Shavuot, and lasted for 33 days. It has been described as a spontaneous attack on a defenseless population during the armed uprising against the rule of Ibrahim Pasha of Egypt, the Ottoman governor. The event took place during a power vacuum while Ibrahim Pasha was fighting to quell the wider revolt in Jerusalem.

Accounts of the month-long event tell of large-scale looting, as well as killing and raping of Jews and the destruction of homes and synagogues by Druze and Muslims. Many Torah scrolls were desecrated and many Jews were left severely wounded. The event has been described as a pogrom or "pogrom-like" by some authors. Hundreds fled the town, seeking refuge in the open countryside or neighbouring villages. Lebanese Druze troops quelled the rioting under the orders of Ibrahim Pasha following the intervention of foreign consuls. The instigators were arrested and later executed in Acre.

== Prelude ==
Safed had long been inhabited by Musta'arabi Jews. It became a kabbalistic centre from the 1540s onwards when students attracted by the teachings of sages such as Moses ben Jacob Cordovero settled there. By the 1830s around 4000 Jews were living in the town, comprising at least half the population. Throughout their history, the Jews of Safed, though supported by the Sublime Porte, had been the target of oppressive exactions by corrupt local officials. In 1628, the Druze seized the city and, holding it for several years, despoiled the local community, and the Jewish population declined as Safed Jews moved to Hebron and Jerusalem. The 1831 annexation of Palestine to the Egyptian Ottoman governorate by Muhammad Ali rendered life relatively more secure than had been the case under the Ottomans. In 1833, however, at the approach of Ibrahim Pasha, the Jewish quarter of Safed was plundered again by the Druze, although the inhabitants managed to escape to the suburbs.

A year later, in 1834, it was announced that new taxation laws would be imposed, and conscription was introduced, drafting fellahin into the Egyptian army, who were also disarmed by local notables. The news was greeted by widespread anger. The Druze of the Galilee themselves, profiting from a weakness of control over their area, rose in revolt in the spring and were joined by a mass uprising by the fellahin, who resented local Jewish collaboration with the Egyptians. Safed had been severely damaged by the 1834 Jerusalem earthquake in May of that year, and following the uprising, attacks broke out on the weaker members of Ottoman towns, namely the Jews and Christians. It was in this setting that the plunder at Safed was unleashed, causing many Jews to seek refuge among friendly Arabs in the neighbouring town of Ein Zeitim. One account, retold by several Safed Jews to the 25-year-old Alexander William Kinglake, who visited in 1835, blamed the incident on the intolerant rantings of a local Muslim cleric named Muhammad Damoor. The account stated that at the beginning of 1834, Damoor publicly prophesied that on June 15, the "true believers would rise up in just wrath against the Jews, and despoil them of their gold and their silver and their jewels."

== Attack ==
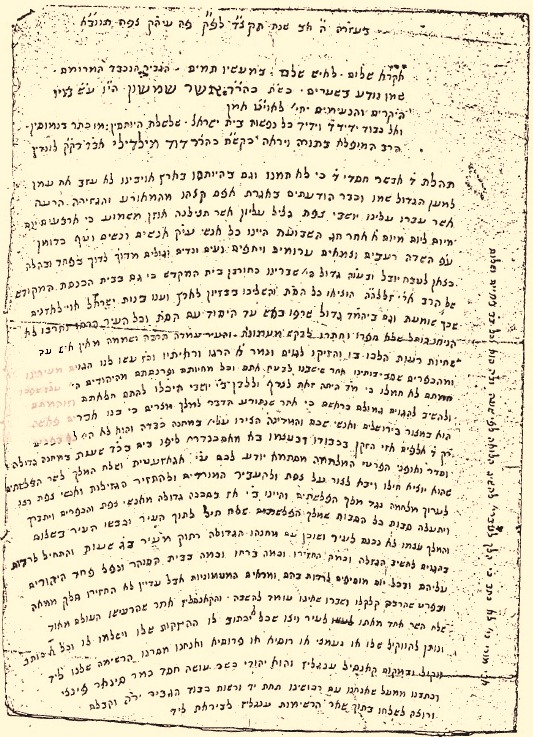
Letter to the Jewish community of London from a resident of Safed describing the event and appealing for assistance, 10 August 1834

The account of Neophytos, a monk of the Church of the Holy Sepulchre, described the looting of the town, alongside similar events in Ramla, Lydda, Jaffa, Acre and Tiberias, noting that the perpetrators "robbed the Jews, who lived in these towns, of immense property, as is reported, for there was no one to offer any opposition".

The 1850 account of Rabbi Joseph Schwartz stated that "Everything was carried off which could possibly be removed, even articles of no value; boxes, chests, packages, without even opening them, were dragged away; and the fury with which this crowd attacked their defenceless victims was boundless... [The perpetrators] were perfectly safe and unmolested; for they had learned that Abraim Pacha was, at the moment, so much occupied at Jerusalem and vicinity with his enemies there, that he could not go into Galilee."

One anecdote suggests the rioting was premeditated, organised by a local antisemitic Muslim cleric. According to the anecdotes narrated to Kinglake, when June 15 arrived, Muhammad Damoor appeared to the gathered Muslim crowd and incited them to fulfill his prophesy. Kinglake only mentions the occurrence of looting, writing that "the most odious of all outrages, that of searching the women for the base purpose of discovering such things as gold and silver concealed about their persons, was perpetrated without shame." Kinglake's is the only account which mentions the individual involvement of a local Muslim clergyman.

Other reports suggest the attack was more violent. Isaac Farhi (d. 1853) described how several Jews were killed and raped in the attack. Men, women and children were robbed of their clothes and then beaten. Some fled into the surrounding fields and remained naked "like wild animals" until the danger passed. 12 year-old Jacob Saphir was among refugees who found sanctuary in the adjacent village of Ein al-Zeitun, assisted by a sympathetic Arab sheikh. He describes how for the first three days they had nothing to eat and how they hid in fear of their lives for forty days. Afterwards, they had found their homes completely ransacked and emptied; "not even small jugs, doors or windows had been left behind." Menachem Mendel Baum, a prominent member of the Ashkenazi community, published a book (Korot ha-ʻitim li-yeshurun be-Erets Yisrael, 1839) vividly detailing his recollections. He describes an aggressive onslaught, including one incident in which a group of elderly Jews, including pious rabbis, were beaten mercilessly while hiding in a synagogue. In May 1934, an article appearing in Haaretz by Palestinian historian and journalist Eliezer Rivlin (1889–1942) described the event of 100 years earlier in detail. His article, based on similar first-hand accounts, tells of how the head of the community, Yisroel ben Shmuel of Shklov, was threatened with his life and another rabbi who had fled to the hills seeking refuge in a cave was set upon and had his eye gouged out. Rivlin states many Jews were beaten to death and severely wounded. An estimated 500 Torah scrolls were destroyed. Valuable antique books belonging to the 14th-century rabbi Isaac Aboab I were also lost. Jewish homes were ransacked and set on fire as looters searched for hidden gold and silver.

Some Jews managed to escape to a nearby fortress and held out there for a few weeks. The mob unsuccessfully tried to break into the building to reach the fugitives. The sources do not indicate how many Jews died. It seems to have not been many, though hundreds were wounded.

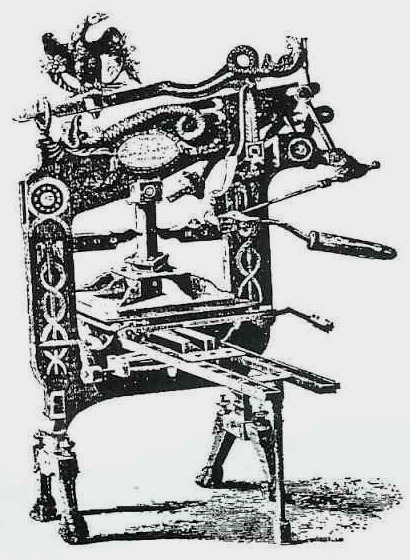
British philanthropist Sir Moses Montefiore furnished Yisrael Bak with a new printing press (pictured) after his original one was destroyed in the pogrom

The sole Hebrew printing press in Palestine and many copies of the Bible were destroyed. It was three years before the press started functioning again. Yisrael Bak, who established the printing house in Safed, incurred a wound on his foot that left him with an enduring limp. Bak would later write of his experience fighting to protect his workers and the printing press from the Arab rampage, which nearly killed him. Among the distinguished men who gave their lives helping others were Rabbis Leib Cohen, Shalom Hayat and Mendel of Kamnitz, who wandered around the streets without fear of the attackers to return little children to their mothers, rescuing the victims physically and emotionally, and burying the dead.

== Suppression and aftermath ==
Rabbi Joseph Schwartz noted the justice that once calm had been restored, Ibrahim Pasha's army arrested and executed a number of perpetrators, and enforced summary justice on many suspects to ensure stolen goods were returned:

The most respectable Mahomedans of Zafed and its environs were arrested as the authors of the outrage, and some of them were afterwards publicly executed, and whatever could be found of the stolen property of the Jews was restored. Every Jew was believed, when saying that he recognised this or that Arab among the robbers. The person so accused was instantly arrested, and punished with blows till he at last confessed and gave up his booty. Even many of the richest and most respectable of the Arabs were arrested, loaded with chains, and punished, upon the mere assertion of a very poor and common Jew. The word of a Jew was regarded as equal to the command of the highest authority, and severe punishment was at once resorted to, without any previous investigation, without any grounds or proofs. In this manner much of the stolen property was discovered; since many, in order not to be exposed to the violence of the Druses, delivered up everything of their own accord. The Jews were now required, by order of the Pacha, through the intervention of the consuls, to make out a correct list of all they had lost, of whatever they missed, and to indicate the true value of the same, and to hand it in to Abraim Pacha through means of the European consuls.

While in hiding from the rampage, Yisroel ben Shmuel of Shklov wrote letters to leaders of foreign nations based in Beirut who might be willing to take action to protect their citizens in Safed. Ibrahim Pasha of Egypt sent Bashir Shihab II, the Emir of Mount Lebanon, to suppress the revolt, and his arrival with his troops led to the end of the rioting by mid-July and the arrest and execution of perpetrators. Safed's Jewish community was devastated, with the destruction of ritual objects including torah scrolls, as well as of synagogues and of Bak's printing press, the area's only press for Hebrew publications; residents were only able to recover a tenth of the value of the property destroyed. Most of the rebels fled, but thirteen ringleaders along with the town's governor were captured, tried and publicly hanged in Acre. The Jews returned to their homes and gathered their few remaining belongings. According to Löwe's investigations, the loss incurred amounted to 135,250 piasters. The consuls tried to raise money to compensate victims and made lists of the damages. When Ibrahim Pasha returned, he imposed an indemnity on the surrounding villages, but the victims received only 7% of the value of the damage. Only a small proportion of stolen property was ever recovered.

== See also ==
- 1517 Safed attacks
- 1660 destruction of Safed
- Battle of Hebron
- 1838 Druze attack on Safed
- 1929 Palestine riots

== Bibliography ==
- Karagila, Svi (1983). "Samuel ben Israel Peretz Heller Describes the Sack of Safed 1834" (PDF). Cathedra (in Hebrew). 27: 109–116. Archived from the original (PDF) on 17 December 2010.
- Schwartz, Joseph. (1850). A descriptive geography and brief historical sketch of Palestine. A. Hart. pp. 403–407.
