= Yisrael Bak =

Jewish publisher (1797–1874)

- ישראל ב"ק
- Born: 1797; Berdichev, Kiev Governorate, Russian Empire
- Died: November 1874 (aged 76–77); Jerusalem, Ottoman Empire
- Occupation: Publisher
- Years active: 1816–1874
- Spouses: Bayla; Raisa
- Children: 6 girls and 1 boy, Nisan Bak
- Relatives: Israel Dov Frumkin (son-in-law); Shimon and Eliezer Rokach (grandsons)

Yisrael Bak (Hebrew: ישראל ב"ק) (1797 – November 1874) (also called by the Yiddish surname Drucker, which means "printer") was a printer, a publisher and public figure in the Old Yishuv in the Land of Israel in the 19th century. He established one of the earliest Jewish farming communities in the Galilee. He revived Hebrew printing in Safed after a hiatus of 250 years and established the first Hebrew printing house in Jerusalem. He published Havatzelet, the second Hebrew newspaper published in the land of Israel.

== Early life and emmigration to Safed ==
Bak was born in Berdichev, then part of the recently formed Kiev Governorate of the Russian Empire, in 1797. According to one family tradition, the surname Bak is based on an abbreviation of the Hebrew "Baal Koreh" (Hebrew: בעל קורא, lit. 'Reader of the Torah'), a position that the father of the family, Rabbi Avraham Bak, held in the synagogue of Rabbi Levi Yitzchak of Berditchev. Another tradition claims that the origin of the name is an abbreviation of "Ben Kedoshim" (Hebrew: בן קדושים, lit. 'Son of martyrs'), as one of the patriarchs of his family was killed for Kiddush Hashem

At the age of 19, he opened a Hebrew printing house, which operated for 9 years. He left Europe in 1831 to avoid the Russian cantonist draft for his son Nissan, and brought a printing press with him when he immigrated with his family to the Land of Israel. After a 2000 mile journey, he arrived in 1832 in Safed and established a printing house, the first Hebrew press in the land since the Safed Hebrew Press of 1577.

From 1830 until 1840, Safed and the Galilee were under the rule of the Egyptian governor, Muhammed Ali and his son Ibraham Pasha, who had defeated the Ottoman Turkish army. They relaxed the previous harsh Ottoman Empire's discriminatory measures against the Jews and the Christian communities. They opened the region to more tolerant and modern ideas. Under their protection, Israel Bak's printing business fared well as did Safed's Jewish community. Bak was a traditional healer as well as a Jewish community leader, and when the Pasha fell ill, Bak helped him in his recovery.

Pasha's liberal ideas angered the Arab community. In June 1834, Arabs rampaged through Safed's Jewish community during a revolt against the Egyptian governor's rule. Thirteen synagogues and as many as 500 Torah scrolls were destroyed. Bak fought to protect his printing press and 30 workers against the Arab rioters. He was stabbed multiple times in his left foot, and had an enduring limp all his life. His printing press was badly damaged.

The Egyptian governor restored order in Safed and Bak rebuilt his printing press. The great earthquake in Safed in 1837 devastated the city, killing over 4,000 Jews. This was followed by another Arab riot in the city in 1838 that completely destroyed Bak's printing press business and contributed to the death of his young wife, Baila.

Without a family printing business nor a home, Bak appealed to the Egyptian governor for help. The Egyptian governor granted him a parcel of land on the slopes of Mt Meron. Bak and 15 other Jewish families established a farming settlement on the land called Jermak. It was the first settlement established by Jewish immigrants in the modern era. Bak entrusted his son Nissan its management. In 1939, British businessman and philanthropist Moses Montefiore and his wife, Lady Judith, traveled to the land of Israel and visited Jermak. He promised to send Bak a new printing press.

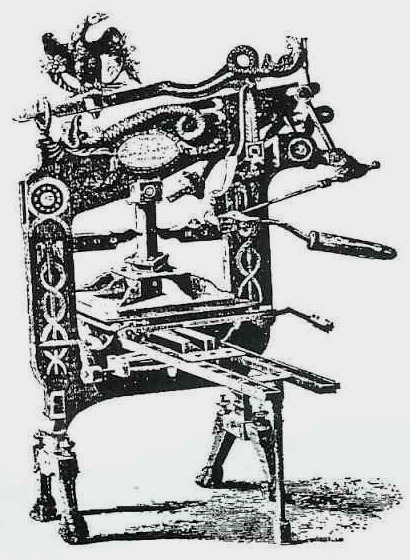
British philanthropist Sir Moses Montefiore furnished Yisrael Bak with a new printing press (pictured) after his original one was destroyed in the pogrom

During the Egyptian–Ottoman War (1839–1841), Ibrahim Pasha was removed and the Ottomans returned to power. This contributed to the end of the Jewish settlement in Jermak. Remnants of the buildings and plantations can still be found there today, and it is known as Khirbet Bak (Bak's Ruin).

== Later years and life in Jerusalem ==
In 1841 after the destruction of the agricultural farm in Jermak and the printing house in Safed, Bak left the Galilee and moved his family to Jerusalem. He continued to be very active in Jewish life in the Galilee, and sent a petition to Muhammad Ali, the then ruler of Syria, asking him to intervene in the Damascus Blood Libel and stop the torture of the falsely accused detainees.

Bak established the first Hebrew printing house in Jerusalem, preceded only by the printing house of the Armenian community about a decade earlier. In 1843, Sir Moses Montefiore remembered his encounter with Bak in Safed and Jermak, and made good on his promise to provide him with a new printing press, which was called "Moshe and Yehudit", named after Montefiore and his wife Judith.

In Jerusalem, Bak joined the Hasidic community. His son Nisan Bak built the Hasidic Tiferet Yisrael Synagogue in the Jewish Quarter of the Old City.

As the sole printer in Jerusalem, Bak held a monopoly on Hebrew printing in the city. In the early 1860s, this changed, with the establishment of a competing printing house by Yoel Moshe Salomon, Michal HaCohen and Yehiel Brill, where Ha-Levanon was printed. As a counter to Ha-Levanon, in 1863, Bak began to publish Havatzelet with his son-in-law, Israel Dov Frumkin. Havatzelet ("The Lilly" in Hebrew) was the second Hebrew newspaper to be published in the land of Israel. It was published for more than forty years.

== Literature ==
- Me'ir Benayahu, "בית דפוסו של ר ישראל ב"ק בצפת וראשית הדפוס בירושלים" (Rabbi Yisrael Bak's Printing House in Safed, and the Beginning of Printing in Jerusalem)
- Abraham Ya'ari, "זכרונות ארץ ישראל, כרך א': י', ישוב חקלאי ראשון של עולים בגליל העליון, ר' ישראל ב"ק, 1837–1839." (Memories of the Land of Israel I: The First Agricultural Settlement of Immigrants in the Upper Galilee, Rabbi Yisrael Bak, 1837–1839)
- Getzl Karsal, "לקסיקון הספרות העברית בדורות האחרונים (כרך א, עמ' 305–306, בערכו), בהוצאת ספרית פועלים 1965–1967" (Lexicon of Hebrew Literature in Recent Generations (Bd, S. 305–306))
- Saev Aner, "סיפורי משפחות, תל אביב: משרד הביטחון - ההוצאה לאור, 1990, עמ' 65–72" (Family Stories, Tel Aviv: Ministry of Defense, 1990, S. 65–72.)
- Arieh Morgenstern, "'בית הדפוס של ישראל בק בצפת – גילויים חדשים', על ספרים ואנשים 9 (תשנ"ה), 6–7" (Yisrael Bak's Printing House in Safed - new revelations, About Books and People 9 (1994), 6–7)
