= 1517 Safed attacks =

Clash between Mamluks and Ottoman rulers in Safed, Israel

The Safed attacks were an incident that took place in Safed soon after the Turkish Ottomans had ousted the Mamluks and taken Levant during the Ottoman–Mamluk War in 1517. At the time the town had roughly 300 Jewish households. The severe blow took place as Mamluks clashed bloodily with the new Ottoman authorities. The view that the riot's impact on the Jews of Safed was severe is contested.

Historians link the event to the general conflict taking place in the country between the incoming Ottoman regime and its opponents and note that the Jews suffered maltreatment during the war. Accounts of the attack against the Jews in Safed were recorded by historian Rabbi Elijah Capsali of Candia, (Crete) and Rabbi Joseph Garson, who were living in Damascus at the time. According to these reports, many Jews were killed and left injured. They were compelled to flee the city and their property was plundered. Scholars debate whether or not the event led to a decline in the Jewish population of Safed, but all agree that a few years later, Jews had re-established a significant presence in the city.

The attack may have been initiated by retreating Mamluk soldiers who accused the Jews of treacherously aiding the Turkish invaders, with Arabs from the surrounding villages joining the melee. Alternatively, the attack occurred during an attempt by local Mamluk sheikhs to reassert their control after being removed from power by the incoming Turks. David suggests that the violence may have erupted after rumours of an Ottoman defeat in Egypt led to clashes between supporters of the old regime and those who backed the newly imposed Turkish authority. Supporters of the deposed Mamluk governor attacked Ottoman officials and after having murdered the Ottoman governor, the mob turned upon the Jews and rampaged through the Jewish quarter, the Jews suffering particular maltreatment.

Many Jews were reportedly killed, while others were wounded or had their property pillaged. According to Garson, the Jews were "evicted from their homes, robbed and plundered, and they fled naked to the villages without any provisions." Many subsequently fled the city, but the community was soon rehabilitated with the financial help of Egyptian Jewry.

The Jewish community quickly recovered. The many Jews who had fled and sought refuge in neighbouring villages returned, and within 8 years the community had reestablished itself, exceeding the former level of 300 households. The Ottoman overthrow of the Mamluks brought about important changes. Under the earlier dynasty, Egyptian Jews were guided by their Nagid, a rabbi also exercising the functions of a prince-judge. This office was abolished because it represented a potential conflict with the jurisdiction of the hahambaşi or chief rabbi in Istanbul, who represented all Jews in the empire, and who had, via a Jewish officer (kahya), direct access to the sultan and his cabinet, and could raise complaints of injustices visited upon Jewish communities by governors in the provinces or Christians.

== See also ==
- 1517 Hebron attacks
- 1834 looting of Safed
- 1838 Druze attack on Safed
- History of the Jews in the Ottoman Empire

== Bibliography ==
- Ben-Ami, Shlomo; Mishal, Nissim (2000). Those Were the Generations. Yedioth Ahronoth. ISBN 978-9-6544-8745-0.
- David, Abraham (1988). "Demographic Changes in the Safed Jewish Community of the 16th Century". In Róbert, Dán (ed.). Occident and Orient: A Tribute to the Memory of Alexander Scheiber. Brill Archive. ISBN 978-9-6305-4024-7.
- David, Abraham (1999). In Zion and Jerusalem: the itinerary of Rabbi Moses Basola (1521-1523). Translated by Dena Ordan. Bar-Ilan University. ISBN 978-9-6522-2926-7.
- David, Abraham (2010). To Come to the Land: Immigration and Settlement in 16th-Century Eretz-Israel. Translated by Dena Ordan. University of Alabama Press. ISBN 978-0-8173-5643-9.
- Fine, Lawrence (2003). Physician of the Soul, Healer of the Cosmos: Isaac Luria and His Kabbalistic Fellowship. Stanford University Press.
- Finkelstein, Louis (1970). "Eretz Yisrael Under Ottoman Rule, 1517-1917". The Jews: Their History. Schocken Books. ISBN 9780805202717.
- Schur, Nathan (1983). Toldot Tsfat (in Hebrew). Tel Aviv: Am Oved and Dvir.
- Shmuelevitz, Aryeh (1999). Ottoman history and society: Jewish sources. Isis Press.
- Silberman, Neil Asher (2001). Heavenly Powers: Unraveling the Secret of the Kabbalah. Castle Books. ISBN 978-0-7858-1324-8.

== Muslim-Jewish conflicts ==
- David, Abraham. Further data on the pogrom of 1517 against the Jews of Safed, Cathedra 8 (June 1977), p. 190-94. (Hebrew)
- Tamar, David. On the Jews of Safed in the Days of the Ottoman Conquest, Cathedra 11 (1979), p. 181-82. (Hebrew)
