= 1838 Druze attack on Safed =

Druze and Muslim attack on the Jews of Safed (1838)

The 1838 Druze attack on Safed began on July 5, 1838, during the Druze revolt against the rule of Ibrahim Pasha of Egypt. Tensions had mounted as the Druze captured an Egyptian garrison outside of Safed. The local Safed militia of several hundred was heavily outnumbered by the Druze rebels, and the city was gripped in despair as the militia eventually abandoned the city and the Druze rebels entered the city on July 5. The Druze rebels and a Muslim mob descended on the Jewish quarter of Safed and spent three days attacking Jews, plundering their homes and desecrating their synagogues, in scenes reminiscent of the looting and pillaging of the Jews in the city that took place four years earlier as part of the Peasants' revolt in Palestine. Some Jews ended up leaving the town, moving south to Jerusalem and Acre.The legacy of the riots and the earthquake led the center of Jewish life to shift from Safed to Jerusalem in the subsequent decade.

== Prelude ==
By the 19th-century, the Galilean city of Safed comprised a major Jewish center. It had become a kabbalistic centre during the 16th-century, reaching a size of about 15,000 at its peak. The number of residents had declined through the 17th and 18th centuries but it had increased from its low point to between 7,000 and 8,000 in the year before the attacks, with Jews comprising a majority of the population in 1837. The Jews of Safed had been subjected to a month-long attack in 1834 during the Peasants' Revolt: More than 5,000 Arab peasant rebels had launched a revolt protesting against legislation imposed by the new Egyptian ruler Muhammad Ali, with some using the uprising as an opportunity to attack the Jews. In addition to large-scale looting, Jews were killed and raped, and their homes, synagogues and Torah scrolls were destroyed by the attackers. After several months, the Egyptians managed to crush the rebellion and regain control. The Jews of Safed began to slowly recover from the devastation. Not long after, Safed was again the scene of devastation when the strong Galilee earthquake of 1837 resulted in thousands of deaths and the destruction of many buildings. The northern, Jewish section of the town was almost entirely destroyed. By 1838, the tense relationship between the fellahin and the Egyptian overlords was again mounting and a full-scale Druze revolt erupted in January. In summer of 1838, the Druze captured a heavily outnumbered Egyptian garrison outside Safed.

== The attack ==
During the three days of the attack, murders, looting and ritual desecration of Jewish holy places took place. Many Jewish residents fled south, leaving the remaining Jewish population below a thousand. Louis Loewe recounted how the Druze mob had demanded that they be paid a ransom of 2,500 pounds and threatened the rabbinic leader of the Ashkenazi Jewish community with death by the sword if they refused to meet the demands. The community could not raise the funds required by the attackers and the rabbi, his hands and feet bound, was willing to accede and have is head cut off, after which the Druze mob agreed to allow the Jews some time to raise the ransom they wanted.

Fearing an attack, the Jewish community had sought protection from the area's governor, who reassured them of their safety and sent soldiers to defend the Jewish section of the city. When the attack ultimately hit Safed, the governor fled and the Jews were left unprotected. Loewe wrote in his diary:

We huddled together in Rebbe Avraham Dov's house... The women were hysterical and the children crying. The Rebbe asked me to write a note in Arabic to the mayor, pleading with him not to forsake us in this desperate time. I did so, but his answer was mere lip service.

According to Loewe, the Jews became "Open prey for the ravenous rebels". The Druze rebels were joined by Muslim mob and they looted the Jewish quarters, as the Druze rebels thought the Jews possessed hidden treasures and local Muslims encouraged them to attack. The plunder lasted for three days.

Yisrael Bak, who was attacked, handicapped for life from a foot wound, and saw his printing press destroyed during the Arab rampage in 1834, was once again a victim of an Arab attack that left his printing business destroyed. This time, Bak decided to leave Safed with his family and printing business, eventually settling in Jerusalem.

During the course of the attack, some Jews were assisted by friendly Arabs. One Arab by the name of Muhammed Mustafa, had helped protect them, lending them money and providing them with food and clothing. This time, Ibrahim Pasha's response was more swift.

In the wake of the attacks, many Jews fled to Acre or Jerusalem, leaving 1,000 families in Safed, leading to Jerusalem surpassing Safed as the largest Jewish city in the Old Yishuv in the subsequent decade.

== See also ==
- 1660 destruction of Safed
- 1834 looting of Safed
- 1929 Palestine riots
