= Battle of Hebron =

1834 battle in Palestine

- Part of Peasants' revolt in Palestine
Date	Early August 1834
Location	Hebron – Part of Egyptian-ruled provinces of Damascus Eyalet, nominally part of the Ottoman Empire
Result	Egyptian victory; Massacre of inhabitants; Conscription orders carried out; Plunder of town

Belligerents
Egypt Eyalet	Rebels of Hebron and Nablus Sanjak: Qasim and Barqawi clans of Nablus Sanjak; 'Amr tribe of Hebron Hills

Commanders and leaders
Ibrahim Pasha	Qasim al-Ahmad; Abd al-Rahman 'Amr 'Isa al-Barqawi

Strength
4,000 infantry 2,000 cavalry	N/A

Casualties and losses
260	500 killed (rebels and civilians, including 12 Jews)

The Battle of Hebron occurred in early August 1834, when the forces of Ibrahim Pasha of Egypt launched an assault against Hebron to crush the last pocket of significant resistance in Palestine during the Peasants' revolt in Palestine. After heavy street battles, the Egyptian army defeated the rebels of Hebron, and afterward subjected its inhabitants to violence following the fall of the city. About 500 civilians and rebels were killed, while the Egyptian Army experienced 260 casualties.

Although the Jews had not participated in the uprising and despite Ibrahim Pasha's assurances that the Jewish quarter would be left unharmed, Hebronite Jews were attacked. A total of 12 Jews were killed. The Jews of Hebron later referred to the events as a Yagma el Gabireh "great destruction".

== Background ==
The peasants' revolt in 1834 was a popular uprising against conscription and disarmament measures applied by Ibrahim Pasha that took five months to quell. Though notables play a key role, peasants formed the insurgency's core and attacked cities like Jerusalem. One consequence was that they also engaged in extensive plundering and assaults on local Jewish and Christian minorities and on fellow Muslims. One of the key centers of rebellion was in the central hilly regions of Nablus, Jerusalem and Hebron. Hebron had suffered from Ibrahim Pasha's exactions. In the preceding year, under a rule imposing the conscription of one-fifth of the male population, 500 Hebronites were drafted into the Egyptian army because they were needed to fight ‘the Nazarene nations’.

As Ibrahim Pasha struggled to quash the rebellion, local forces from Nablus and Jerusalem concentrated on making a last stand in Hebron. Egyptian gunners blew up the castle defences, and, on entering the city, killed both Muslims and Jews (though the latter played no role in the rebellion), having been given six hours to enjoy the fruits of their victory. Ibraham Pasha "unleashed his troops to loot, pillage, murder, and rape in revenge and to terrorize the inhabitants so as to quash any thoughts of a repeat of their actions against his government". The Nablus and Jerusalem insurgents also had a role in the violence against the Jewish community. Ibrahim Pasha is said to have intervened eventually to avoid their extermination.

== Battle and massacre ==
After Ibrahim Pasha subdued Nablus Sanjak, the epicentre of the revolt, they proceeded to pursue rebels led by the revolt's paramount leader, Qasim al-Ahmad, who had fled Jabal Nablus to Hebron, where he reached an agreement with the sheikhs of that town to continue the uprising. At a site in the northern vicinity of Hebron, the rebels encountered the Egyptian Army and engaged briefly with them before withdrawing to Hebron. When the Egyptian Army entered the city, they fought the rebels, consisting of peasants and townspeople, in heavy street battles. The rebels put up stiff resistance but were ultimately dealt decisive blows by Egyptian artillery. The rebels inflicted about 260 casualties on the Egyptian contingent at Hebron, which consisted of around 4,000 infantry and 2,000 cavalry, before the Egyptians gained complete control over the city.

Mass killings and rapes by the Egyptian troops took place in Hebron after they captured the city from the rebels. About 500 rebels and inhabitants were killed, and 750 Muslim men were taken as conscripts. Another 120 adolescents were taken by Egyptian officers "to do with as they wanted", according to historian Baruch Kimmerling. The Jews of Hebron had not participated in the rebellion, but Egyptian soldiers who entered the city ignored this. For three hours, troops committed atrocities against the people of Hebron. The Jews were not subject to Pasha's conscription policy but suffered the "most cruel outrages" and were targeted for "special violence". While many Muslims managed to escape the impending danger, the Jews remained, confident the Egyptians would not harm them. The Jews of Jerusalem had received an assurance from Ibrahim that Hebron's Jews would be protected. In the end, seven Jewish men and five girls were killed. Isaac Farhi also described violent attacks on the Jews of Hebron committed by Egyptian soldiers. He writes that the attack in Hebron was even worse than the 1834 looting of Safed. Synagogues were desecrated, houses were ransacked, and valuable items were stolen leaving the Jewish community of Hebron destitute. The violence succeeded in uniting Hebron's Sephardic and Ashkenasi communities, but it took until 1858 for the community to fully recover.

Abd al-Rahman 'Amr of Dura, a leader of the Hebron rebels, fled the town, and Qasim al-Ahmad and a number of his fighters also managed to flee Hebron and crossed the Jordan River to seek shelter in al-Karak. Ibrahim Pasha and his troops left Hebron to pursue Qasim on 14 August.
