= Jaba', Jenin =

Palestinian village in Jenin, State of Palestine

Jaba'
- Municipality type C

Arabic transcription(s)
  - Arabic: جبع
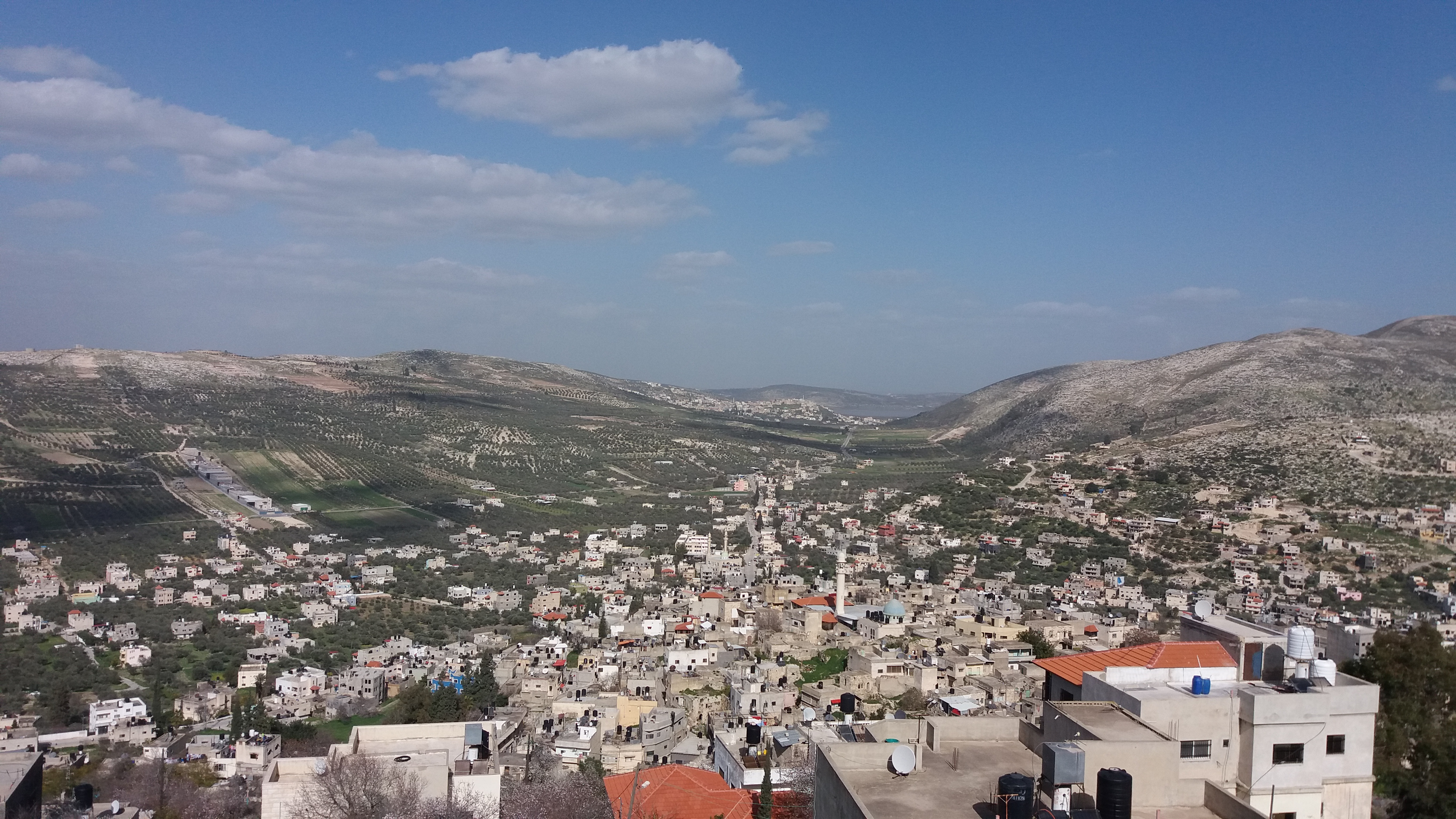
- Jaba', Jenin, 2019

- Location of Jaba' within Palestine
- Coordinates: 32°19′26″N 35°13′20″E
- Palestine grid: 171/192
- State: State of Palestine
- Governorate: Jenin

Government
  - Type: Municipality
  - Head of Municipality: Bassam Jarrar

Population (2017)
  - Total: 10,413
- Name meaning: From "hill"

Jaba' (Arabic: جبع) is a Palestinian village in the northern West Bank, in the Jenin Governorate of the State of Palestine, located 8 kilometres (5.0 mi) southwest of the city of Jenin. According to the Palestinian Central Bureau of Statistics, the village had a population of 8,942 in the 2007 census and 10,413 by 2017. '

The village is situated on the slopes of the Jabal Dabrun mountain. The village and its immediate vicinity contain a number of archaeological sites, including a tomb for a certain Neby Yarub. During the Ottoman era, Jaba' served as a throne village of the powerful Jarrar family. The village is administered by a municipal council, currently headed by Bassam Jarrar.

== Etymology ==
The village's name Jaba' is the Hebrew word for "hill", according to Edward Henry Palmer, writing in 1881. Biblical scholars Edward Robinson and Eli Smith believed that the village's name made it "decidedly another ancient Geba or Gibeah", but they were not aware of the existence of an ancient village with either of those names in Jaba's vicinity. A possibility, they noted, was that Jaba' was the "Gabe", mentioned by the Byzantine historian Jerome, that was located 16 Roman miles from the coastal city of Caesarea. Others identify this Jaba with the Geba of the Mishnah, explicitly noted as being in Samaria.

== History ==
Sherds from Middle Bronze Age II, Iron Age I and II, Persian, Hellenistic, Roman through Byzantine Empire era have been found in Jaba'. Zertal found that his survey "support the traditional identification of Jaba with Geba' (gb') of the Samaria Ostraca (no. 8), with “Geba' of Beit Cuthim” (Tosefta, Baba Metzia, 6:10), and with “the leeks of Gebac” (Mishnah Kelim 17:5).".

The village is not mentioned in Medieval sources, although the old core of the village appears to date back sometime during the Mamluk and/or Ottoman periods.

=== Ottoman era ===
Jaba' was incorporated into the Ottoman Empire with the rest of Palestine in 1517. In the 1596 Ottoman tax records, it appeared under the name of Jab'a, located in the Jabal Sami Nahiya, in the Nablus Sanjak. It had a population of 42 families, all Muslim, who paid a fixed tax-rate of 33.3% on agricultural products, including wheat, barley, summer crops, olive trees, goats and beehives, in addition to occasional revenues and a press for olives or grapes; a total of 15,304 akçe.

During Ottoman rule, Jaba' served as the throne village (kursi) of the Jarrar family, who were the most powerful noble family in the rural hinterland of Nablus. In later years, a faction of the family moved to a nearby area and established modern-day Sanur, which the family also fortified.

Robinson visited the village in 1838, noting that it was "a large village, or rather town, on the slope of the range of hills", and that there was a tower in the village with the "appearance of antiquity". The village was placed in the esh-Sharawiyeh esh-Shurkiyeh (the Eastern) district, north of Nablus.

In 1851, Jaba's inhabitants issued a complaint to Hafiz Pasha, the governor of Jerusalem, accusing the Jarrar sheikhs of the village of forcing them to sign promissory notes about selling their future olive oil (a total of 2,600 jars within two years) to the sheikhs at a reduced price. The residents accused the sheikhs of seeking to enrich themselves rather than collect taxes on behalf of the authorities. The case was transferred to the Nablus Advisory Council headed by Mahmud Abd al-Hadi, who concluded that the residents' claims about the sheikhs were false and that the promissory notes were meant to make up for the resident's failure to pay taxes due to a bad olive harvest. The petitioners and the sheikhs subsequently met and reconciled their differences peacefully.

In 1882, the PEF's Survey of Western Palestine (SWP) described Jaba' as a "A flourishing village on the hill-side. The houses well built of stone. It is surrounded with fine olive groves, and has several wells. The camp was established on the west on open arable ground, close to one well which has a Shaduf, or long pole with a weight for drawing up water. There is potters' clay close by, and a pottery in the village. The place is the Kursi, or 'throne' of the famous Jerrar family, once governors of this district. It is apparently an ancient site. There is a rock-cut tomb on the east."

=== British Mandate era ===
British forces captured Palestine, including Jaba', in 1917 during World War I and thereafter established a British Mandate over the country. In the 1922 census of Palestine, Jaba' had a population of 1,372 Muslims. In the 1931 census, the population increased to 1,542, mostly Muslims and nine Christians, living in 311 households. During the 1936–1939 Palestine revolt, Jaba' was home to Fawzi Jarrar, a leading rebel commander in the Jenin area.

Jaba's population grew to 2,100 in the 1945 statistics; 2,090 Muslim and 10 Christians. The total area of the village was 24,620 dunams, of which 96.1% was Arab-owned, the remainder being public property. Of the village's lands, 2,671 dunams were used for plantations and irrigable land, 11,054 dunams for cereals, while 42 dunams were built-up (urban) areas.

=== Jordanian era ===
After the 1948 Arab–Israeli War, Jaba' came under Jordanian rule.

In 1961, the population of Jaba' was 2,507.

=== 1967, aftermath ===
Since the 1967 Six-Day War, Jaba' has been under Israeli occupation.

In the 2005 municipal elections, Fatah won the largest number of seats (seven), followed by Hamas (five). Political independents won one seat. The mayor is Bassam Jarrar.

== Geography ==
Jaba' is located in the Jenin Governorate in the northern West Bank. It is about 8 kilometers southwest of the governorate's capital, Jenin. The nearest localities are Fandaqumiya and Silat ad-Dhahr to the west, Rama and Ajjah to the northwest, Anzah to the north, Sanur and Meithalun to the northeast, Siris to the east, Yasid to the southeast, Beit Imrin to the south and Burqa to the southwest.

Jaba' is partially situated on the northern slopes of Jabal Dabrun and partially in the agriculturally-rich valley below the mountain. The old core of the village is situated on a formerly fortified tell, which consists of roughly 30 dunams, at the summit of Jabal Dabrun. The summit of the Jabal Hureish mountain is 3.5 kilometers east of Jaba'. The elevation of old Jaba' is 540 meters above sea level, and it is 40 meters higher than its immediate surroundings. Jabal Dabrun's summit is 651 meters above sea level. To the east and west of the village are springs, including Ein al-Gharbi.

== Archaeology ==
In 1882, the SWP found "East of the village is a tomb, very rudely cut in white soft rock. The entrance on the north-east leads to an ante-chamber with two coats of plaster on the walls; the inner chamber has three kokim; the door between is a rude arch of small masonry."

There are four archaeological sites in the vicinity in Jaba', namely Khirbet al-Naqb, Khirbet Jafa, Khirbet Sabata and Khirbet Beit Yarub. In the valley north of Jaba', near the road to Sanur, is a site with an area of 15 dunams. Several flint tools were found among olive groves growing at the site. Khirbet Sabata to the east of Jaba' contains the remains of houses and wells.

=== Bayt Yarub ===
Bayt Yarub is located two kilometers north of the village and covers an area of 7.5 dunams. Among the ruined structures is the tomb (maqam) of Neby Yarub ibn Ya'qub (the prophet Yarub son of Jacob). The tomb is a square-shaped building with a dome and containing two rooms. It is built of rubble stones. North of the tomb is a larger 19th-century building with several rooms. Between the Neby Yarub tomb and the 19th-century building are scattered remains and potsherds from the Byzantine, early Islamic, Mamluk and Ottoman eras.

The site was counted in the 1596 Ottoman tax records as a Muslim village with a population of eight families and three bachelors.

=== Khirbet Jafa ===
Khirbet Jafa is located 1.5 kilometers east the northeast of the village. It has a total area of 15 dunams and is situated on a ridge descending north from Mount Hureish and towards Jaba's valley with an elevation of 410 meters above sea level. The ruins consist of the remains of a tower, walls, the foundations of buildings and water tanks. Of these remains, there are two partially preserved Ottoman-era structures standing on terraces close at the summit of the ridge, well-built structures from Byzantine era on the western and southern slopes, and remains of medieval-era structures near the valley. Pottery sherds indicate Khirbet Jafa was an inhabited site during the Iron Age II, Persian, Hellenistic, Roman, Byzantine, early Islamic and medieval periods.

=== Khirbet al-Naqb ===
Khirbet al-Naqb is located southeast of Jaba', and has few intact remains, consisting of scattered building stones. The total area of the site is six dunams and it is situated on a round hill with an elevation of 510 meters above sea level, close to where Wadi Wadian and Wadi Beit Imrin meet. The site is named "Naqb" because it is near a naqb (old pathway) between Jaba' and Sebastia to the south. Pottery sherds date back to the Hellenistic, Roman, Persian and Byzantine periods.

The only structure that has been partially preserved is the remains of structure that measures 8 meters long and five meters wide. It was built of large stone blocks. In the western slope of the hill are six burial caves, some having arched entrances, while another burial cave is located in the southern part of the site. In the northwestern part of the hill are a cistern, trough and several stones, likely making it the remains of an old quarry.

== Demographics ==
In the 1997 census by the Palestinian Central Bureau of Statistics (PCBS), Jaba' had a population of 6,493. Palestinian refugees accounted for 16.4% of the inhabitants. In the 2007 PCBS census, the population grew to 8,492, living in 1,498 households with each household containing an average of between five and six members. The gender ratio was 46.7% female and 53.3% male.

Some residents of Jaba' have origins in Hebron or Egypt, while others descend from immigrants from the nearby northern villages or in Transjordan.

== Bibliography ==
- Barron, J.B., ed. (1923). Palestine: Report and General Abstracts of the Census of 1922. Government of Palestine.
- Conder, C.R. (1895). Tent Work in Palestine: A Record of Discovery and Adventure. A. P. Watt & Son.
- Conder, C.R.; Kitchener, H.H. (1882). The Survey of Western Palestine: Memoirs of the Topography, Orography, Hydrography, and Archaeology. Vol. 2. London: Committee of the Palestine Exploration Fund.
- Dauphin, C. (1998). La Palestine byzantine, Peuplement et Populations. BAR International Series 726 (in French). Vol. III : Catalogue. Oxford: Archeopress. ISBN 0-860549-05-4.
- Doumani, B. (1995). Rediscovering Palestine: Merchants and Peasants in Jabal Nablus. University of California Press.
- Government of Jordan, Department of Statistics (1964). First Census of Population and Housing. Volume I: Final Tables; General Characteristics of the Population (PDF).
- Government of Palestine, Department of Statistics (1945). Village Statistics, April, 1945.
- Hadawi, S. (1970). Village Statistics of 1945: A Classification of Land and Area ownership in Palestine. Palestine Liberation Organization Research Center.
- Hütteroth, W.-D.; Abdulfattah, K. (1977). Historical Geography of Palestine, Transjordan and Southern Syria in the Late 16th Century. Erlanger Geographische Arbeiten, Sonderband 5. Erlangen, Germany: Vorstand der Fränkischen Geographischen Gesellschaft. ISBN 3-920405-41-2.
- Macalister, R.A.S.; Masterman, E.W.G. (1905). "Occasional Papers on the Modern inhabitants of Palestine, part I & part II". Quarterly Statement - Palestine Exploration Fund. 37: 343–356.
- Mills, E., ed. (1932). Census of Palestine 1931. Population of Villages, Towns and Administrative Areas (PDF). Jerusalem: Government of Palestine.
- Neubauer, A. (1868). La géographie du Talmud : mémoire couronné par l'Académie des inscriptions et belles-lettres (in French). Paris: Lévy.
- Palmer, E.H. (1881). The Survey of Western Palestine: Arabic and English Name Lists Collected During the Survey by Lieutenants Conder and Kitchener, R. E. Transliterated and Explained by E.H. Palmer. Committee of the Palestine Exploration Fund.
- Robinson, E.; Smith, E. (1841). Biblical Researches in Palestine, Mount Sinai and Arabia Petraea: A Journal of Travels in the year 1838. Vol. 3. Boston: Crocker & Brewster.
- Swedenburg, Ted (2003). Memories of Revolt: The 1936–1939 Rebellion and the Palestinian National Past. University of Arkansas Press. ISBN 1610752635.
- Zertal, A. (2004). The Manasseh Hill Country Survey. Vol. 1. Boston: BRILL. ISBN 9004137564.

== Documentary film ==
- i.so.chro.nism: [twenty-four hours in jabaa], the documentary film from the village during the Second Intifada, by Helga Tawil-Souri
