= Fandaqumiya =

- Municipality type D (Village council)

Arabic transcription(s)
  - Arabic: الفندقومية
  - Latin: al-Fandaqumiya (official); Pentakomia (unofficial)
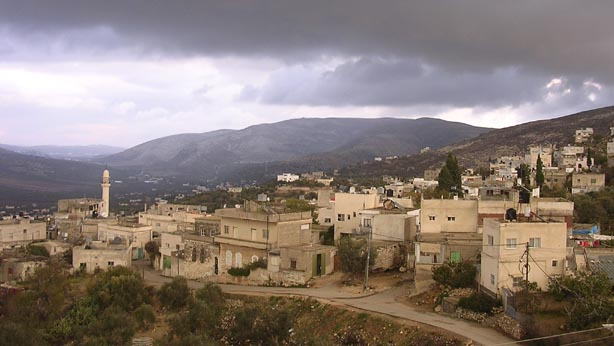

- Location of Fandaqumiya within Palestine
- Coordinates: 32°19′13″N 35°12′13″E
- Palestine grid: 169/191
- State: State of Palestine
- Governorate: Jenin

Government
  - Type: Village council

Area
  - Total: 3.9 km^{2} (1.5 sq mi)

Population (2017)
  - Total: 4,265
  - Density: 1,100/km^{2} (2,800/sq mi)

Fandaqumiya, (Arabic: الفندقومية, al-Fandaqumiyah, Pentakomia) is a Palestinian village located in the Jenin Governorate of the northern West Bank, northwest of Nablus. According to the Palestinian Central Bureau of Statistics, the town had a population of 3,363 inhabitants in mid-year 2006 and 4,265 by 2017.

== Etymology ==
The Arabic name of the village, Al Fandaqumiyah (الفندقومي), is a corruption of the Greek term Pentakomia: Komia means 'village' or 'community', while penta means 'five'. Pentakomia probably refers to an administrative unit of five villages which existed in the area.

== Geography ==
Fandaqumiya is located in the northern West Bank, on the road leading north from Nablus to Jenin. The village is partly situated on the slope of a hill in the Musheirif Range and partly built on adjacent ridges in between the valley of Jaba' to the north and the Musheirif hills to the south. Its old core is in the slope part of the village with an elevation of 470 meters above sea level (about 30 meters higher than its surroundings) and a total area of 20 dunams.

The nearest localities are Jaba' to the immediate east, Beit Imrin to the south, Burqa to the southwest, Silat ad-Dhahr to the immediate west, and Ajjah to the north. as well as the former Israeli settlements of Homesh and Sa-Nur, which were dismantled in Israel's 2005 unilateral disengagement plan.

== History ==
=== Antiquity ===
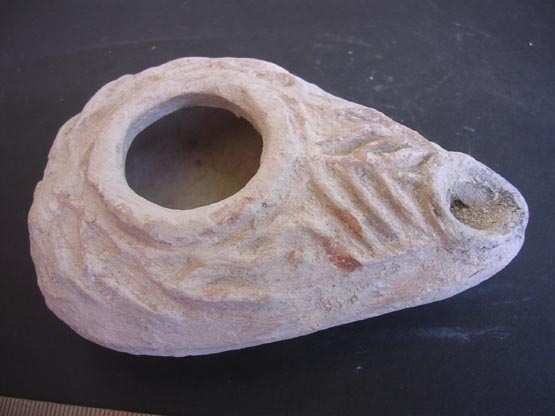
Byzantine period "candlestick" lamp with the typical palm branch motif found in the village Fandaqomiya (Pentacomia).

Pottery sherds from the Hellenistic, early and late Roman and the Byzantine eras have been found here. A sacred cave exists above the village on the south, which is probably an ancient rock-cut chapel.

Fandaqumiya appears as Penṭāḳūmewatha (Hebrew: פנטאקומוותה), in the 6th-7th century Mosaic of Reḥob. There, it is described as a Jewish village in a region of Sebaste which was inhabited mostly by non-Jews and, therefore, agricultural produce obtained from the area could be taken by Jews without the normal restrictions imposed during the Sabbatical years, or the need for tithing.

=== Medieval period ===
The village is mentioned in Crusader sources of 1178, as a place sold to the Knights Hospitallers.

Yaqut al-Hamawi (1179–1229) noted it as "a village belonging to and lying among the hills of Nablus."

Pottery sherds from the early Muslim and Medieval eras have also been found here.

=== Ottoman era ===
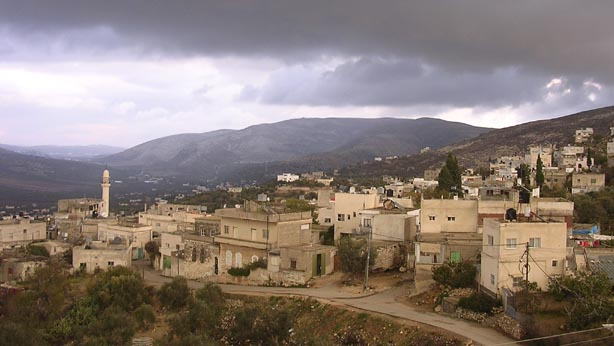
Viewpoint of village, the nearby village and fortress of Sanur can be seen in the background

In 1596 Fandaqumiyya appeared in the Ottoman tax registers as being in the nahiya of Jabal Sami, part of the Sanjak of Nablus. It had a population of eleven households and one bachelor, all Muslim. The inhabitants paid a fixed tax-rate of 33.3% on agricultural products, including wheat, barley, summer crops, olive trees, goats and beehives, in addition to occasional revenues and a press for olives or grapes; a total of 11,752 akçe. Fandaqumiya was mentioned by the Turkish traveler Evliya Çelebi in 1640.

In 1830, during the military campaign against a revolt by the Jarrar family of Sanur, Emir Bashir Shihab's forces set fire to Fandaqumiya. In 1838, Edward Robinson passed by and noted it as a being a small village, located in the esh-Sharawiyeh esh-Shurkiyeh (the Eastern) district, north of Nablus.

French explorer Victor Guérin visited the village in 1863 and 1870, and estimated it as having about 500 inhabitants. He describes it as being situated on the slopes of a high hill. With abundant waters, the whole slope was cultivated with beautiful olive trees, figs and pomegranates.

In 1882, the PEF's Survey of Western Palestine described Fandaqumiya as "a very small village on the slope of the hill, with three springs to the south-west, small and marshy."

A spur of the Ottoman Hejaz railway to Damascus was built through the area, and a station was opened nearby at Sebastia. After the collapse of the Ottomans, locals took apart the rail infrastructure for secondary use in construction. Many of the steel beams can still be seen in the roofs of local homes.

=== British Mandate era ===
In 1917, Fandaqumiya was captured by General Allenby's British forces from the Ottomans, and three years later it was assigned to British Mandatory Palestine. In the 1922 census of Palestine, conducted by the British Mandate authorities, Fandaqumiya had a population of 327, all Muslims. This increased in the 1931 census to a population of 445, still all Muslim, living in 101 houses.

Soon after the British arrived, they built a police fort on a nearby hill. Despite many villagers being employed in the construction, relations with the British forces were at times rocky owing to tax disputes. During the riots of 1936-1939, some villagers launched attacks on the British troops, and the village was subject to British reprisals. During the 1940s, the British administration funded modern water and agriculture development projects as well as an elementary school.

In the 1945 statistics the population was 630 Muslims, with 4,079 dunams of land, according to an official land and population survey. 885 dunams were used for plantations and irrigable land, 2,737 dunams for cereals, while 14 dunams were built-up (urban) land.

=== Jordanian era ===
In the wake of the 1948 Arab–Israeli War, and after the 1949 Armistice Agreements, Fandaqumiya came under Jordanian rule.

The Jordanian census of 1961 found 1,014 inhabitants in Fandaqumiya.

=== Post-1967 ===
Since the 1967 Six-Day War, Al Fandaqumiya has been under Israeli occupation, along with the rest of the West Bank. Under the Oslo Accords, the town was assigned to Area B. The Greek name of this village inspired name of Homesh, the nearby Israeli settlement whose name also derives from the number five.

== Bibliography ==
- Barron, J.B., ed. (1923). Palestine: Report and General Abstracts of the Census of 1922. Government of Palestine.
- Clermont-Ganneau, C.S. (1896). [ARP] Archaeological Researches in Palestine 1873-1874, translated from the French by J. McFarlane. Vol. 2. London: Palestine Exploration Fund.
- Conder, C.R.; Kitchener, H.H. (1882). The Survey of Western Palestine: Memoirs of the Topography, Orography, Hydrography, and Archaeology. Vol. 2. London: Committee of the Palestine Exploration Fund.
- Government of Jordan, Department of Statistics (1964). First Census of Population and Housing. Volume I: Final Tables; General Characteristics of the Population (PDF).
- Government of Palestine, Department of Statistics (1945). Village Statistics, April, 1945.
- Guérin, V. (1875). Description Géographique Historique et Archéologique de la Palestine (in French). Vol. 2: Samarie, pt. 2. Paris: L'Imprimerie Nationale.
- Hadawi, S. (1970). Village Statistics of 1945: A Classification of Land and Area ownership in Palestine. Palestine Liberation Organization Research Center.
- Hütteroth, W.-D.; Abdulfattah, K. (1977). Historical Geography of Palestine, Transjordan and Southern Syria in the Late 16th Century. Erlanger Geographische Arbeiten, Sonderband 5. Erlangen, Germany: Vorstand der Fränkischen Geographischen Gesellschaft. ISBN 3-920405-41-2.
- Le Strange, G. (1890). Palestine Under the Moslems: A Description of Syria and the Holy Land from A.D. 650 to 1500. Committee of the Palestine Exploration Fund.
- Mills, E., ed. (1932). Census of Palestine 1931. Population of Villages, Towns and Administrative Areas. Jerusalem: Government of Palestine.
- Palmer, E.H. (1881). The Survey of Western Palestine: Arabic and English Name Lists Collected During the Survey by Lieutenants Conder and Kitchener, R. E. Transliterated and Explained by E.H. Palmer. Committee of the Palestine Exploration Fund.
- Rey, E.G. (1883). Les colonies franques de Syrie aux XIIme et XIIIme siècles (in French). Paris: A. Picard.
- Robinson, E.; Smith, E. (1841). Biblical Researches in Palestine, Mount Sinai and Arabia Petraea: A Journal of Travels in the year 1838. Vol. 3. Boston: Crocker & Brewster.
- Zertal, A. (2004). The Manasseh Hill Country Survey. Vol. 1. Boston: BRILL. ISBN 9004137564.
