= Sanur, Jenin =

Sanur
- Municipality type D (Village council)

Arabic transcription(s)
  - Arabic: صانور
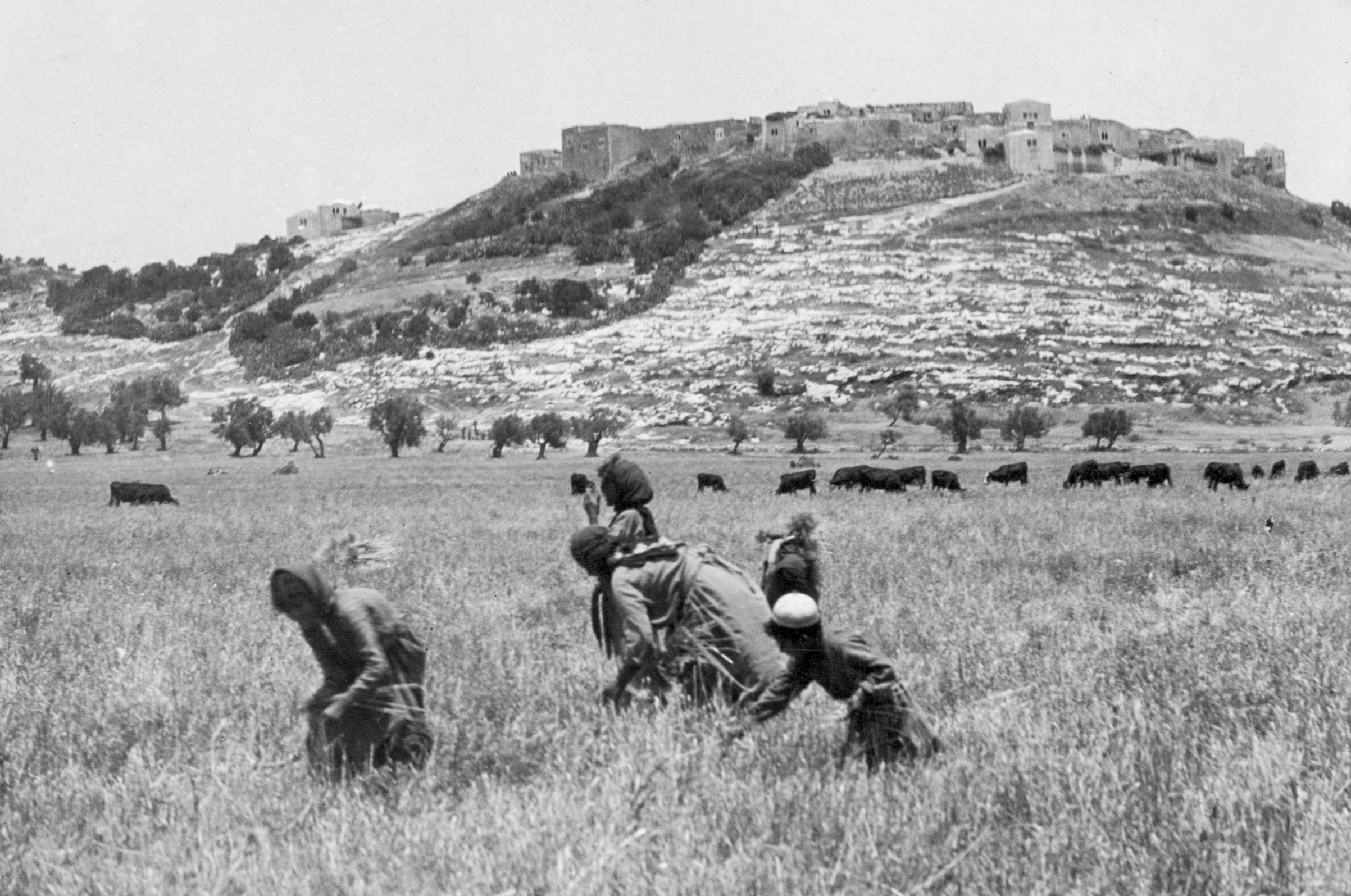
- Sanur around 1908

- Location of Sanur within Palestine
- Coordinates: 32°21′23″N 35°14′49″E
- Palestine grid: 173/195
- State: Palestine
- Governorate: Jenin

Government
  - Type: Village council

Population (2017)
  - Total: 5,036
- Name meaning: Sanur, personal name

Sanur (Arabic: صانور, also spelled Sanour) is a Palestinian village located 26 kilometres (16 mi) southwest of Jenin, in the Jenin Governorate of the State of Palestine. According to the Palestinian Central Bureau of Statistics, Sanur had a population of 4,067 in 2007 and 5,036 in 2017. During the late Ottoman era, Sanur served as a fortified village of the Jarrar family and played a key role in limiting the centralized power of the Ottoman sultanate, the Ottoman governors of Damascus and Acre and the Ottoman-aligned Tuqan family of Nablus from exerting direct authority over the rural highlands of Jabal Nablus (modern-day northern West Bank).

== History ==
An old cistern is found by the mosque. Cisterns are also carved into rock on the steep slopes, as are tombs.

Ceramic remains (sherds) have been found here, dating from the Middle Bronze Age IIB, Iron Age I and IA II, Persian, Hellenistic, early and late Roman, Byzantine, early Muslim and Medieval eras.

=== Ottoman era ===
Sanur, like the rest of Palestine, was incorporated into the Ottoman Empire in 1517, and in 1596 it appeared in Ottoman tax registers as being in the nahiya (subdistrict) of Jabal Sami, part of Nablus Sanjak. It had a population of 23 households and five bachelors, all Muslims. The villagers paid a fixed tax rate of 33.3% agricultural products, including on wheat, barley, summer crops, olive trees, goats and/or beehives, in addition to occasional revenues; a total of 5,200 akçe.

Modern Sanur was founded by a branch of the Jarrar family that migrated to the site from Jaba', during the late Ottoman era. Sanur served as the Jarrar family's throne village, from where they controlled many of the villages in the region of Jenin, Lajjun, the Jezreel Valley (Marj Ibn Amer) and Nazareth. In 1785, under the leadership of Sheikh Yusuf al-Jarrar, a formidable fortress was built in the village, which guarded access to Nablus from the north. Part of the fortress's walls had been built earlier by Sheikh Yusuf's father, Muhammad Zabin. The fortress, along with their large peasant militia, solidified the Jarrar family's military strength. Unlike the other roughly two dozen throne villages in Palestine's central highlands, Sanur was completely encircled by fortified walls.

In the mid and late 18th century, the Arab sheikh Zahir al-Umar emerged as the autonomous ruler of the Galilee and the coastal town of Acre, which he fortified. From Acre, Zahir extended his control southward into Jarrar territory. The Jarrar family entered into a coalition with the Beni Sakhr tribe, but failed to prevent Zahir from taking over Nazareth and the Jezreel Valley in 1735. Zahir pursued the Jarrar family's forces into Jabal Nablus but once he reached Sanur, he realized he would not be able to overcome its fortress. The Jarrars' successful resistance against Zahir rendered the region of Jabal Nablus to be largely outside Zahir's control. Sanur marked the limit of Zahir's influence and continued to limit the control of successive rulers of Acre. In 1764, the Ottoman governor of Damascus, Uthman Pasha al-Kurji, attempted to subdue Sanur, and battled the Jarrar family under the leadership of Muhammad al-Jarrar in Jabal Nablus.

In 1790, Jezzar Pasha, the Acre-based governor of the Sidon and Damascus provinces, laid siege to Sanur after its leader, Yusuf al-Jarrar, refused to submit to Jezzar's authority. Although the fortress at Sanur was heavily bombarded, it withstood the siege for over fifty days until Jezzar's forces withdrew after an attempt to mine the fort ended up destroying much of Jezzar's own camp instead. Jezzar again tried to subdue Sanur in 1803, but this attempt also failed. Palestinian historian Beshara Doumani dated Jezzar's second siege to 1795.

In 1830, Abdullah Pasha of Acre attempted to assert his control over the rural landlords of Jabal Nablus. The latter had been part of the Damascus Vilayet, but was apportioned to the Sidon Eyalet under Abdullah's governorship by the governor of Damascus in 1830 because of his inability to collect taxes from the area's ruling clans. When some of the rural landlords, led by the Jarrar and Qasim families, revolted against Abdullah's appointment, he laid siege to Sanur with the help of reinforcements sent by Emir Bashir Shihab II of Mount Lebanon. The siege lasted for four months. After multiple assaults against the village's fortress, three artillery batteries positioned west of the village managed to blast an opening into the fortress. As retaliation for the casualties inflicted on Abdullah Pasha's men during the siege, he had the fortress's walls and towers torn down. Sanur's olive trees were also cut down on Abdullah Pasha's orders. The power of the Jarrar family was severely damaged by the loss of Sanur's fortress.

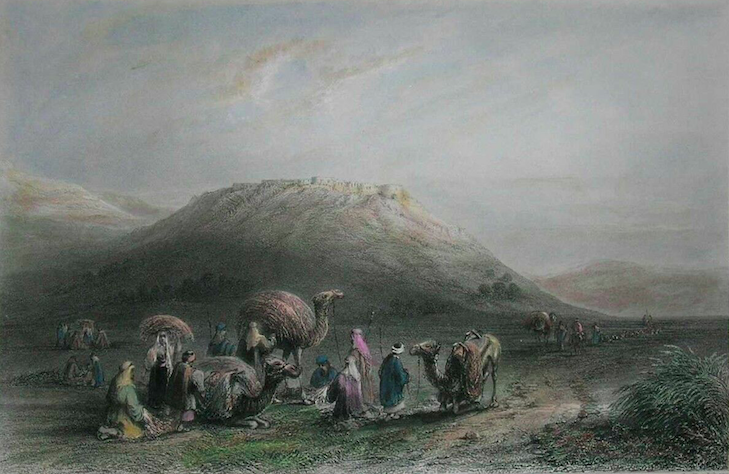
Sanur, ca 1850s, by W.H. Bartlett

In the summer of 1838, Biblical scholar Edward Robinson visited the village and noted that it was "once considerable", but following its destruction by Abdullah Pasha, it "was a shapeless mass of ruins, among which a few families still find a home, living chiefly in caves." Robinson also noted that Sanur was not mentioned in medieval sources, and that it was located in the esh-Sharawiyeh esh-Shurkiyeh (the Eastern) district, north of Nablus. In 1840, the village was bombarded by the Ibrahim Pasha's army. The area of the Jarrar's control was a subdistrict (nahiya) known as Mashariq al-Jarrar, which included 28 villages in 1850. In 1870, the French explorer Victor Guérin visited the village. He wrote that "it seems to have been predestined to serve as the site of a stronghold. A walled enclosure, flanked by towers, formerly surmounted the summit; it is now in part over the town. A great number of houses are also demolished or partly rebuilt. That of the Sheikh, which I visited, is like a small fort". In 1882, the PEF's Survey of Western Palestine described Sanur as a small fortified village, with about 200 to 300 souls. It was still the headquarters of one branch of the Jarrar family, the other still being in Jaba’.

=== British Mandate era ===
In the 1922 census of Palestine, conducted by the British Mandate authorities, Sanur had a population of 682, all Muslims. The population increased to 759, still all Muslim, in the 1931 census, in 164 houses. During the 1936–39 Arab revolt in Palestine, the chief commander of the revolt, Abd al-Rahim al-Hajj Muhammad, was killed in Sanur in a shootout with British troops and their local allies who were pursuing him. He was temporarily buried in the village before his body was relocated to Dhinnaba.

In the 1945 statistics, during the last years of the British Mandate, the population of Sanur (including the hamlet of Nukheil) was 1,020 Muslims. Sanur's land area in 1945 consisted of 12,897 dunams of land, according to an official land and population survey. 2,370 dunams were used for plantations and irrigable land, 7,259 dunams for cereals, while 21 dunams were built-up (urban) land.

=== Jordanian era ===
After the 1948 Arab-Israeli War, Sanur came under Jordanian rule.

In the 1961 Jordanian census, the village had 1,471 inhabitants.

=== Post-1967 ===
Since the Six-Day War in 1967, Sanur has been under Israeli occupation.

Under the Oslo Accords, the village was assigned to Area A, which has Palestinian civil and security control. Between 1987 and 2005, the nearby Israeli settlement community of Sa-Nur shared its name with this village. It was evacuated on September 22, 2005 as part of Israel's Disengagement Plan.

== Geography ==
Sanur is located in the highlands of the northern West Bank. The village is situated on an isolated hilltop along the western edge of the valley and seasonal lake of Marj Sanur, which is named after the village. To the west, Sanur is connected to the Hawarah Ridge of the Zawiya Highlands through a low-lying saddle. Mount Hureish, the tallest peak in the vicinity, is to the south. Part of the village is built on the descent toward the natural boundaries of the Marj Sanur valley. The old core of Sanur is on the hilltop and is mostly enclosed by walls that form part of the ruins of Sanur's former fortress. In 1979, the built-up areas of Sanur amounted to around 60 dunams. The average elevation of the village is 420 meters above sea level and it is about 45 meters higher than its immediate surrounding.

Sanur is 26 kilometers southwest of Jenin, the capital of the Jenin Governorate. The nearest localities to Sanur are Meithalun to the east, Misilyah to the northeast, Zawiya to the north, Anzah and Ajjah to the west, and Jaba' to the southwest.

== Demographics ==
Sanur's population as recorded in the 1997 census by the Palestinian Central Bureau of Statistics (PCBS) was 3,181. Palestinian refugees accounted for 20% of the inhabitants. In the 2007 PCBS census, Sanur's population was 4,067. There were 698 households, consisting of an average of five to six members per household.

== See also ==
- Sanur Citadel

== Bibliography ==
- Amiry, S. (1987). Space, Kinship and Gender: The Social Dimension of Peasant Architecture in Palestine. University of Edinburgh-Faculty of Social Sciences. hdl:1842/6987.
- Barron, J.B., ed. (1923). Palestine: Report and General Abstracts of the Census of 1922. Government of Palestine.
- Conder, C.R. (1878). Tent work in Palestine. A record of discovery and adventure. Vol. 1. London: R. Bentley & Son. (pp. 100-104)
- Conder, C.R.; Kitchener, H.H. (1882). The Survey of Western Palestine: Memoirs of the Topography, Orography, Hydrography, and Archaeology. Vol. 2. London: Committee of the Palestine Exploration Fund.
- Dauphin, C. (1998). La Palestine byzantine, Peuplement et Populations. BAR International Series 726 (in French). Vol. III : Catalogue. Oxford: Archeopress. ISBN 0-860549-05-4.
- Doumani, B. (1995). Rediscovering Palestine: Merchants and Peasants in Jabal Nablus. University of California Press.
- Government of Jordan, Department of Statistics (1964). First Census of Population and Housing. Volume I: Final Tables; General Characteristics of the Population (PDF).
- Government of Palestine, Department of Statistics (1945). Village Statistics, April, 1945.
- Guérin, V. (1874). Description Géographique Historique et Archéologique de la Palestine (in French). Vol. 2: Samarie, pt. 1. Paris: L'Imprimerie Nationale.
- Hadawi, S. (1970). Village Statistics of 1945: A Classification of Land and Area ownership in Palestine. Palestine Liberation Organization Research Center.
- Hütteroth, W.-D.; Abdulfattah, K. (1977). Historical Geography of Palestine, Transjordan and Southern Syria in the Late 16th Century. Erlanger Geographische Arbeiten, Sonderband 5. Erlangen, Germany: Vorstand der Fränkischen Geographischen Gesellschaft. ISBN 3-920405-41-2.
- Macalister, R.A.S.; Masterman, E.W.G. (1905). "Occasional Papers on the Modern inhabitants of Palestine, part I & part II". Quarterly Statement - Palestine Exploration Fund. 37: 343–356. doi:10.1179/peq.1905.37.4.343. S2CID 161632875.
- Mills, E., ed. (1932). Census of Palestine 1931. Population of Villages, Towns and Administrative Areas. Jerusalem: Government of Palestine.
- Nimr, Sonia (2012). "A Nation in a Hero: Abdul Rahim al-Hajj Mohammad and the Arab Revolt". In M. LeVine (ed.). Struggle and Survival in Palestine/Israel. University of California Press. ISBN 978-0520262539.
- Palmer, E.H. (1881). The Survey of Western Palestine: Arabic and English Name Lists Collected During the Survey by Lieutenants Conder and Kitchener, R. E. Transliterated and Explained by E.H. Palmer. Committee of the Palestine Exploration Fund.
- Philip, T. (2001). Acre: The Rise and Fall of a Palestinian City, 1730-1831. Columbia University Press. ISBN 9780231123273.
- Robinson, E.; Smith, E. (1841). Biblical Researches in Palestine, Mount Sinai and Arabia Petraea: A Journal of Travels in the year 1838. Vol. 3. Boston: Crocker & Brewster.
- Rustum, A. (1938). The Royal Archives of Egypt and the Disturbances in Palestine, 1834. American University of Beirut Press.
- Saulcy, L.F. de (1854). Narrative of a journey round the Dead Sea, and in the Bible lands, in 1850 and 1851. Vol. 1, new edition. London: R. Bentley. (Saulcy, 1854, vol 1, pp. 87 -89)
- Zertal, A. (2004). The Manasseh Hill Country Survey. Vol. 1. Boston: BRILL. ISBN 9004137564.
