= Meithalun =

- Municipality type C

Arabic transcription(s)
  - Arabic: ميثلون
- Location of Meithalun within Palestine
- Coordinates: 32°20′57″N 35°16′24″E
- Palestine grid: 175/194
- State: State of Palestine
- Governorate: Jenin

Government
  - Type: Municipality
  - Head of Municipality: Jihad Saleh Rabay'a

Area
  - Total: 12.5 km^{2} (4.8 sq mi)

Population (2017)
  - Total: 8,321
  - Density: 666/km^{2} (1,720/sq mi)

Meithalun (Arabic: ميثلون, transliteration: Meithalûn; also spelled Maythalun, Maithaloun or Meithalon) is a Palestinian town in the Jenin Governorate of Palestine, in the northern West Bank, located 26 kilometers south of Jenin. According to the Palestinian Central Bureau of Statistics (PCBS) census, the town had a population of 6,995 in 2007 and 8,321 by 2017.

Meithalun has four mosques, six schools, four pharmacies, two weather stations, two kindergartens, two clinics: maternity and general, several workshops, two multipurpose halls, two cemeteries, a police station, an office of the Ministry of Interior of the State of Palestine, three bakeries, four Internet cafes, two cultural centers, two major diwans, and a bank (Bank of Palestine). The town occupies an area of around 12,495 dunum (historic unit translating to about 1000 square meters).

== Etymology ==
According to E. H. Palmer, Meithalun's name derives from Mithilihieh, which in Phoenician means "image"; the classical Arabic translation would relate to "traces of a dwelling which are becoming effaced".

== History ==
Pottery from the Roman and Byzantine periods in Palestine have been found in the old core of Meithalun.

=== Crusader era ===
Meithalun was referred to "Gastine Medeclala" and "Gastine Mesdedula" by the Crusaders. King Amalric I apportioned half of the site to the Crusader lord Guido and the other half to another lord known as Gilbert of Neapolis. In 1186, it became part of the Jeoshafat Abbey after it was purchased from Guido.

=== Ottoman era ===
Meithalun was incorporated into the Ottoman Empire with the rest of Palestine in 1517. In the 1596 Ottoman tax records, Meithalun had a population of 16 families and one bachelor. The entire population were Muslim. They paid a fixed tax-rate of 33.3% on agricultural products, including wheat, barley, summer crops, olive trees, goats and beehives, in addition to occasional revenues; a total of 7,160 akçe.

During the later Ottoman era, Meithalun was part of the Mashariq Jarrar subdistrict and in the 19th century was in the zone of influence of the Nablus-based textile merchant Hajj Isma'il Arafat, along with the villages of Sanur, Beit Lid, Silat ad-Dhahr and Jaba'. In 1838, Biblical scholar Edward Robinson saw the village when he travelled in the region, and described it as being situated in an extremely fertile area. He listed it as part of the District of Haritheh, north of Nablus.

In 1851–52, French archaeologist Louis Félicien de Saulcy noted that Meithalun was one of two villages in the southern part of the Marj Sanur valley, the other village being Sir. He describes the Marj Sanur valley as being “enclosed within a belt of mountains of a very woody and agreeable aspect.” In 1870, French explorer Victor Guérin described Meithalun as “a small village on a low hill. The Sheikh’s house is well built, and some of the rock-hewn cisterns are presumably ancient." In 1882, the PEF's Survey of Western Palestine described it as “a village of moderate size, of stones and adobe, with a well to the north, situated at the foot of a high hill, with a few olives in the plain”.

=== British Mandate era ===
British forces gained control of Palestine in 1917, during World War I, and later governed it as the British Mandate of Palestine. Meithalun's population in the 1922 census of Palestine, conducted by the British Mandate authorities, was 682, rising to 938 (193 households) in the 1931 census. In the latter census, the hamlet of Kheibar was counted with Meithalun. In both censuses, the entire population was Muslim.

Meithalun's two main clans, the Na'irat and the Ruba'iya, participated in the countrywide 1936–1939 revolt against British rule and increased Zionist settlement in Palestine. Rebels from the Na'irat clan, who had ties to the Jarrar family, fought under commander Fawzi Jarrar of Jaba', while the Ruba'iya fought under the Qassamite commander Abu Khalid of Silat ad-Dhahr and Abu Saysan of Qabatiya. The latter was a traditional ally of the Abd al-Hadi clan, who had economic and political ties to the Ruba'iya.

In the 1945 statistics the population was 1,360, all Muslims, with 12,495 dunams of land, according to an official land and population survey. Of the village's lands, 3,451 dunams were used for plantations and irrigable land, 7,469 dunams for cereals, while 25 dunams were built-up (urban) areas.

=== Jordanian era ===
In the wake of the 1948 Arab–Israeli War, and after the 1949 Armistice Agreements, Meithalun came under Jordanian rule.

In 1961, the population of Meithalun was 2,243.

=== 1967, aftermath ===
Meithalun has been under Israeli occupation since the 1967 Six-Day War. In 1989, during the First Intifada, Israeli troops shot dead Abdallah Rabaya'h, a resident of Meithalun, during clashes between locals and troops as the latter attempted to dismantle a road block set up in the village.

In the 2005 municipal elections, Fatah won the largest number of seats (five), followed by the Popular Front for the Liberation of Palestine (four) and Hamas (three). Political independents won one seat. The mayor is PFLP member Fawaz Saleh Na'irat and the deputy mayor is Hamas member Jihad Saleh Rabay'a.

== Geography ==
Meithalun is located in the northern West Bank, about 17 kilometers south of Jenin, the capital of the Jenin Governorate to which Meithalun belongs. The nearest localities to Meithalun are Sanur to the west, Siris and Judeida to the southeast, Aqqaba to the east, Sir and Zababdeh to the northeast, and Misilyah to the north.

The town is situated along the western edge of Marj Sanur, a valley and seasonal lake. It is the largest locality, of seven total, bordering Marj Sanur and controls the largest share of its fertile lands. It has an average elevation of 385 meters above sea level and is not elevated from its immediate surroundings. The total land area of Meithalun is 12,495 dunams. The old core of the town consists of 18 dunams.

=== Khirbet Kheibar ===
Khirbet Kheibar, or Khirbet Khaybar, an archeological site located on a hill to the northeast of Meithalun, is part of the town's jurisdiction. The tell has an elevation of 423 meters above sea level and consists of ruins, namely the remains of a walled city, building foundations, a tomb and water tanks cut from stone.

== Demographics ==
Meithalun had a population of 5,218 in the 1997 census by the Palestinian Central Bureau of Statistics (PCBS). Palestinian refugees and their descendants accounted for 5.4% of the inhabitants. In the 2007 PCBS census, Meithalun's population grew to 6,955. The number of households was 1,258, with each household containing an average of between five and six persons. Women made up 48.3% of the population and men 51.7%.

Some residents of Meithalon have their origins in Yatta, a city in the south Hebron Mountain, while others are Bedouins.

== Bibliography ==
- Barron, J.B., ed. (1923). Palestine: Report and General Abstracts of the Census of 1922. Government of Palestine.
- Conder, C.R.; Kitchener, H.H. (1882). The Survey of Western Palestine: Memoirs of the Topography, Orography, Hydrography, and Archaeology. Vol. 2. London: Committee of the Palestine Exploration Fund.
- Doumani, B. (1995). Rediscovering Palestine: Merchants and Peasants in Jabal Nablus. University of California Press.
- Government of Jordan, Department of Statistics (1964). First Census of Population and Housing. Volume I: Final Tables; General Characteristics of the Population (PDF).
- Government of Palestine, Department of Statistics (1945). Village Statistics, April, 1945.
- Guérin, V. (1874). Description Géographique Historique et Archéologique de la Palestine (in French). Vol. 2: Samarie, pt. 1. Paris: L'Imprimerie Nationale.
- Hadawi, S. (1970). Village Statistics of 1945: A Classification of Land and Area ownership in Palestine. Palestine Liberation Organization Research Center.
- Hütteroth, W.-D.; Abdulfattah, K. (1977). Historical Geography of Palestine, Transjordan and Southern Syria in the Late 16th Century. Erlanger Geographische Arbeiten, Sonderband 5. Erlangen, Germany: Vorstand der Fränkischen Geographischen Gesellschaft. ISBN 3-920405-41-2.
- Merkel, Broder (2002). Selected Contributions to Applied Geology in the Jordan Rift Valley. Technische Universität Bergakademie. ISBN 3860121626.
- Mills, E., ed. (1932). Census of Palestine 1931. Population of Villages, Towns and Administrative Areas. Jerusalem: Government of Palestine.
- Palmer, E.H. (1881). The Survey of Western Palestine: Arabic and English Name Lists Collected During the Survey by Lieutenants Conder and Kitchener, R. E. Transliterated and Explained by E.H. Palmer. Committee of the Palestine Exploration Fund.
- Robinson, E.; Smith, E. (1841). Biblical Researches in Palestine, Mount Sinai and Arabia Petraea: A Journal of Travels in the year 1838. Vol. 3. Boston: Crocker & Brewster.
- Röhricht, R. (1893). (RRH) Regesta regni Hierosolymitani (MXCVII-MCCXCI) (in Latin). Berlin: Libraria Academica Wageriana.
- Saulcy, L.F. de (1854). Narrative of a journey round the Dead Sea, and in the Bible lands, in 1850 and 1851. Vol. 1, new edition. London: R. Bentley.
- Swedenburg, Ted (2003). Memories of Revolt: The 1936–1939 Rebellion and the Palestinian National Past. University of Arkansas Press. ISBN 1610752635.
- Zertal, A. (2004). The Manasseh Hill Country Survey. Vol. 1. Boston: BRILL. ISBN 9004137564.
