= Al-Judeida (Jenin) =

Judeida
- Municipality type D (Village council)

Arabic transcription(s)
  - Arabic: الجديدة
- Location of Judeida within Palestine
- Coordinates: 32°20′5″N 35°18′7″E
- Palestine grid: 178/193
- State: State of Palestine
- Governorate: Jenin

Government
  - Type: Village council

Population (2017)
  - Total: 5,950
- Name meaning: The dyke

Al-Judeida (Arabic: الجديدة) is a Palestinian village in the Jenin Governorate in the western area of the West Bank, located 14 kilometres (9 mi) south of Jenin. According to the Palestinian Central Bureau of Statistics, the town had a population of 4,738 in the 2007 census and 5,950 by 2017.

== History ==
Al-Judeida is an ancient village, where Byzantine ceramics have been found. Zertal notes that the sherds from the Byzantine era were at the edge of the hilltop upon which al-Judeida stands.

Pottery sherds found in the village mostly date back to the medieval and Ottoman eras. During Crusader rule, in 1168, al-Judeida was an estate called Gidideh.

=== Ottoman era ===
Like all of Palestine, al-Judeida was incorporated into the Ottoman Empire in 1517. In the 1596 Ottoman tax registers, al-Judeida was an entirely Muslim village with a population of 10 families, located in the Nahiya Jabal Sami, in the Nablus Sanjak. The inhabitants paid a fixed tax-rate of 33.3% on agricultural products, including wheat, barley, summer crops, olive trees, goats and beehives, in addition to occasional revenues and a press for grape syrup or olive oil; a total of 3,500 akçe.

Most of the buildings in the old core of Judeida date back to the 16th and 17th centuries.

In 1838, Edward Robinson noted the village when he travelled in the region, as bordering the extremely fertile Marj Sanur. He listed it as part of the District of Haritheh, north of Nablus.

In 1870, French traveler Victor Guérin visited al-Judeida, describing it as being amid "gardens of fig trees, pomegranates and olives. It seems to be an ancient site, because of the many rock hewn cisterns and the well-shaped stones contained in the walls of its 35 houses." In 1882, it was described by the PEF's Survey of Western Palestine as "a good-sized village on flat ground, with a few olives".

=== British Mandate era ===
In the 1922 British census, Al-Judeida had a population of 361, all Muslims, increasing in the 1931 census to 569 inhabitants, still all Muslims, living in a total of 106 houses.

In the 1945 statistics, the population was 830, all Muslims, with 6,360 dunams of land, according to an official land and population survey. Of the village's lands, 2,211 dunams were used for plantations and irrigable land, 2,850 dunams for cereals, while 20 dunams were built-up (urban) areas.

=== Jordanian era ===
Following the 1948 Arab–Israeli War, and the subsequent 1949 Armistice Agreements, Al-Judeida came under Jordanian rule.

The Jordanian census of 1961 found 1,351 inhabitants in Judeida.

=== Post-1967 ===
Since the Six-Day War in 1967, Al-Judeida has been under Israeli occupation. Under the Oslo Accords, the town was assigned to Area A.

On Saturday 9 January 2016 resident Ali Abu Maryam (23) was shot dead by Israeli soldiers at the Beka'ot roadblock.

== Geography ==
Al-Judeida is situated at the southern edge of the Marj Sanur valley on a small hilltop with an elevation of about 425 meters above sea level. The old core of al-Judeida is in the center of the village and is relatively small with an area of 14 dunams. It has narrow alleys that meet at a square in the old core's center. The nearest localities are Siris to the southwest, Meithalun to the northwest, Sir to the north, Aqqaba to the northeast and Tubas to the east.

== Demographics ==
Al-Judeida had a population of 3,639 in the 1997 census by the Palestinian Central Bureau of Statistics (PCBS). Palestinian refugees and their descendants accounted for 17.5% of the inhabitants. In the 2007 PCBS census, al-Judeida's population grew to 4,738. The number of households was 923, with each household containing an average of between five members. Women made up 49.8% of the population and men 50.2%.

== Bibliography ==
- Barron, J.B., ed. (1923). Palestine: Report and General Abstracts of the Census of 1922. Government of Palestine.
- Conder, C.R.; Kitchener, H.H. (1882). The Survey of Western Palestine: Memoirs of the Topography, Orography, Hydrography, and Archaeology. Vol. 2. London: Committee of the Palestine Exploration Fund.
- Dauphin, C. (1998). La Palestine byzantine, Peuplement et Populations. BAR International Series 726 (in French). Vol. III : Catalogue. Oxford: Archeopress. ISBN 0-860549-05-4.
- Government of Jordan, Department of Statistics (1964). First Census of Population and Housing. Volume I: Final Tables; General Characteristics of the Population (PDF).
- Government of Palestine, Department of Statistics (1945). Village Statistics, April, 1945.
- Guérin, V. (1874). Description Géographique Historique et Archéologique de la Palestine (in French). Vol. 2: Samarie, pt. 1. Paris: L'Imprimerie Nationale.
- Hadawi, S. (1970). Village Statistics of 1945: A Classification of Land and Area ownership in Palestine. Palestine Liberation Organization Research Center. Archived from the original on 2018-12-08.
- Hütteroth, W.-D.; Abdulfattah, K. (1977). Historical Geography of Palestine, Transjordan and Southern Syria in the Late 16th Century. Erlanger Geographische Arbeiten, Sonderband 5. Erlangen, Germany: Vorstand der Fränkischen Geographischen Gesellschaft. ISBN 3-920405-41-2.
- Mills, E., ed. (1932). Census of Palestine 1931. Population of Villages, Towns and Administrative Areas. Jerusalem: Government of Palestine.
- Palmer, E.H. (1881). The Survey of Western Palestine: Arabic and English Name Lists Collected During the Survey by Lieutenants Conder and Kitchener, R. E. Transliterated and Explained by E.H. Palmer. Committee of the Palestine Exploration Fund.
- Robinson, E.; Smith, E. (1841). Biblical Researches in Palestine, Mount Sinai and Arabia Petraea: A Journal of Travels in the year 1838. Vol. 3. Boston: Crocker & Brewster.
- Zertal, A. (2004). The Manasseh Hill Country Survey. Vol. 1. Boston: BRILL. ISBN 9004137564.
