= Siris, Jenin =

Siris
- Municipality type D (Village council)

Arabic transcription(s)
  - Arabic: سيريس
- Location of Siris within Palestine
- Coordinates: 32°19′46″N 35°17′23″E
- Palestine grid: 177/192
- State: State of Palestine
- Governorate: Jenin

Government
  - Type: Village council

Population (2017)
  - Total: 6,020
- Name meaning: from personal name

Siris (Arabic: سيريس) is a Palestinian town in the Jenin Governorate in the western area of the West Bank, located 32 kilometers south of Jenin. According to the Palestinian Central Bureau of Statistics, the town had a population of 5400 inhabitants in mid-year 2006 and 6,020 by 2017. Siris has an area of about 12,495 dunums, including 2,500 dunums of state land, about 7,500 dunums planted with olive trees, about 1,500 dunums of land, and the rest used for construction.

== Location ==
Siris is bordered to the north by the villages of Al-Judeida and Sir. To the west is the town of Meithalun, to the south is the village of Yassid.

== History ==
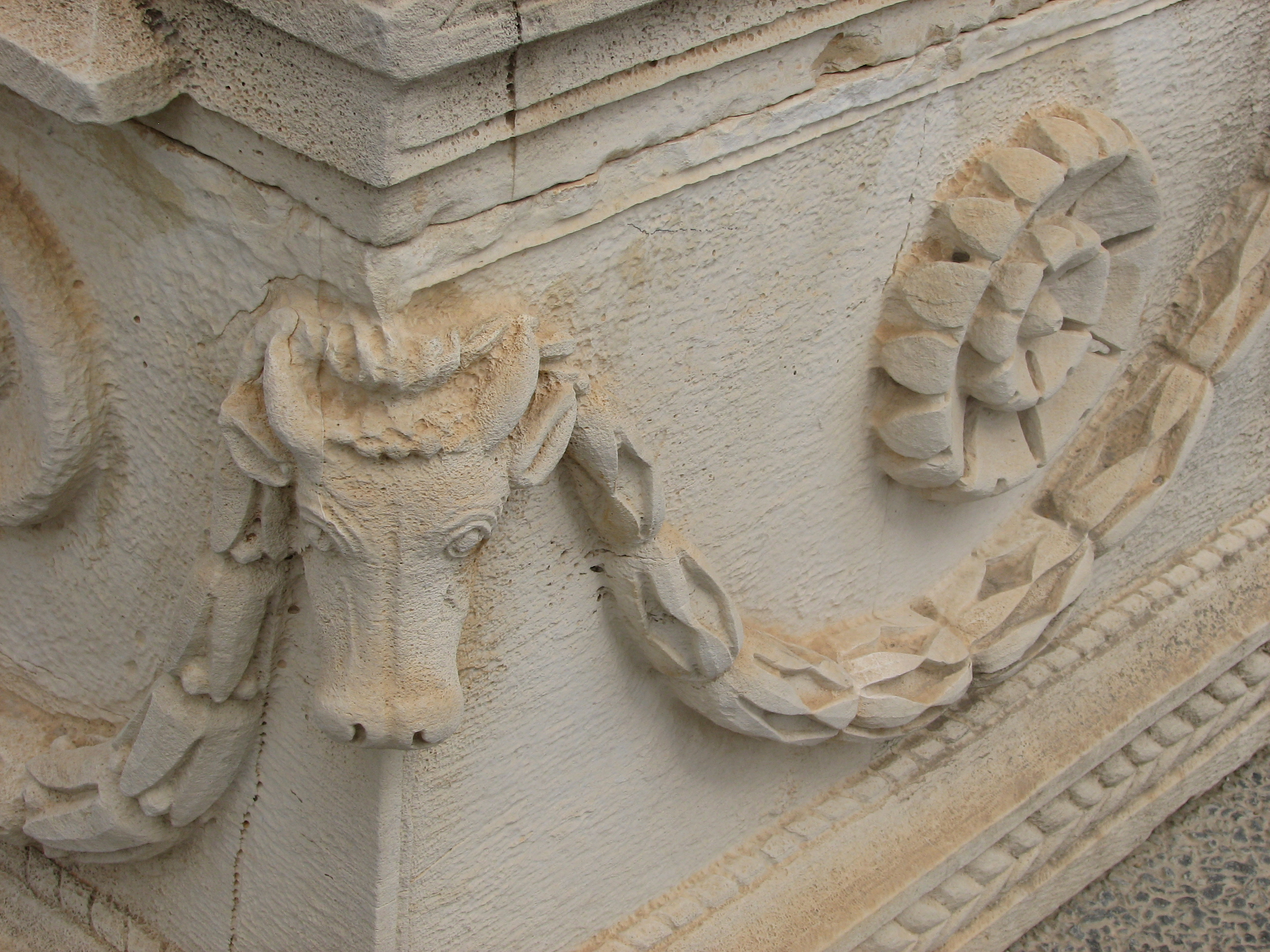
3rd century CE stone sarcophagus found near Siris

Ceramic remains have been found from the Roman era, as well as for the Byzantine era and the early Muslim era.

Siris was one of the stations of ancient Umayyad convoys.

In 1165 a Crusader text mention an estate name Casalien Ciris, which belonged to a Vitzgraf Ulrich.

It is said that the Muslim leader Salah al-Din Ayyubi has passed on and taken Siris as headquarters of his forces.

=== Ottoman era ===
Siris, like all of Palestine, was incorporated into the Ottoman Empire in 1517. In the 1596 tax registers, Siris was part of the nahiya ("subdistrict") of Jabal Sami, part of the larger Sanjak of Nablus. It had a population of 12 households and 3 bachelors, all Muslims. The inhabitants paid a fixed tax rate of 33,3% on agricultural products, including wheat, barley, summer crops, goats and beehives, in addition to occasional revenues; a total of 2,030 akçe.

In the 19th century the Egyptian leader Ibrahim Pasha passed with his forces through Siris during his conquests in the Levant and lived there after he failed to storm the neighboring village of Sanur.

In 1838, Edward Robinson noted the village when he travelled in the region, as bordering the extremely fertile Marj Sanur. He listed it as part of the District of Haritheh, north of Nablus.

In 1870 Victor Guérin noted the village, surrounded by groves of olives.

In 1882, the PEF's Survey of Western Palestine (SWP) described Siris as a small village in the valley, with olives.

=== British Mandate era ===
In the 1922 census of Palestine, conducted by the British Mandate authorities, Siris had 494 Muslims inhabitants, increasing in the 1931 census to 608 Muslims, in a total of 123 houses.

In the 1945 statistics, the population of Siris was 830, all Muslims, with 12,593 dunams of land, according to an official land and population survey. 1,881 dunams were used for plantations and irrigable land, 2,884 dunams for cereals, while 19 dunams were built-up (urban) land and 7,809 dunams were classified as "non-cultivable".

=== Jordanian era ===
In the wake of the 1948 Arab–Israeli War, and after the 1949 Armistice Agreements, Siris came under Jordanian rule.

The Jordanian census of 1961 found 1,207 inhabitants here.

=== Post-1967 ===
After the Six-Day War in 1967, Siris has been under Israeli occupation.

== Bibliography ==
- Barron, J.B., ed. (1923). Palestine: Report and General Abstracts of the Census of 1922. Government of Palestine.
- Conder, C.R.; Kitchener, H.H. (1882). The Survey of Western Palestine: Memoirs of the Topography, Orography, Hydrography, and Archaeology. Vol. 2. London: Committee of the Palestine Exploration Fund.
- Dauphin, C. (1998). La Palestine byzantine, Peuplement et Populations. BAR International Series 726 (in French). Vol. III : Catalogue. Oxford: Archeopress. ISBN 0-860549-05-4.
- Government of Jordan, Department of Statistics (1964). First Census of Population and Housing. Volume I: Final Tables; General Characteristics of the Population (PDF).
- Government of Palestine, Department of Statistics (1945). Village Statistics, April, 1945.
- Guérin, V. (1874). Description Géographique Historique et Archéologique de la Palestine (in French). Vol. 2: Samarie, pt. 1. Paris: L'Imprimerie Nationale.
- Hadawi, S. (1970). Village Statistics of 1945: A Classification of Land and Area ownership in Palestine. Palestine Liberation Organization Research Center.
- Hütteroth, W.-D.; Abdulfattah, K. (1977). Historical Geography of Palestine, Transjordan and Southern Syria in the Late 16th Century. Erlanger Geographische Arbeiten, Sonderband 5. Erlangen, Germany: Vorstand der Fränkischen Geographischen Gesellschaft. ISBN 3-920405-41-2.
- Mills, E., ed. (1932). Census of Palestine 1931. Population of Villages, Towns and Administrative Areas. Jerusalem: Government of Palestine.
- Palmer, E.H. (1881). The Survey of Western Palestine: Arabic and English Name Lists Collected During the Survey by Lieutenants Conder and Kitchener, R. E. Transliterated and Explained by E.H. Palmer. Committee of the Palestine Exploration Fund.
- Robinson, E.; Smith, E. (1841). Biblical Researches in Palestine, Mount Sinai and Arabia Petraea: A Journal of Travels in the year 1838. Vol. 3. Boston: Crocker & Brewster.
- Zertal, A. (2004). The Manasseh Hill Country Survey. Vol. 1. Boston: BRILL. ISBN 9004137564.
