= Marj Sanur =

Valley in the northern West Bank

Coordinates: 32.359258°N 35.286331°E

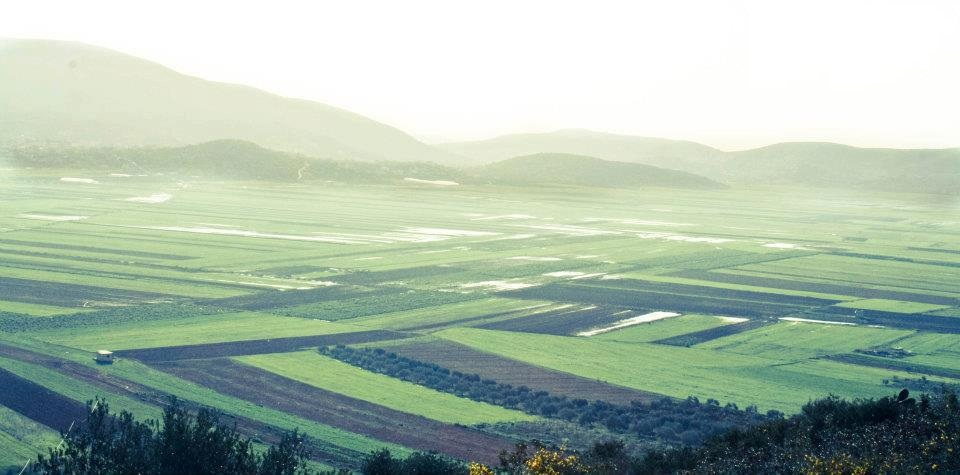
Marj Sanur, 2013

Marj Sanur (Arabic: مرج صانور, translation: "Sanur Valley"; also called Marj al-Ghuruq, translation: "Drowning Valley" is a closed basin within the northern mountains of the West Bank, located entirely in the southern Jenin Governorate, in between the cities of Jenin (to the north) and Nablus (to the south).

Adam Zertal theorized that Majr Sanur was the territory of the Milcah clan of the Israelite tribe of Manasseh during the Iron Age. Today Seven villages border the valley: Sanur, Meithalun, Siris, al-Judeida, Sir, Misilyah and Zawiya. Meithalun is the largest village around the valley and it has the largest share of Marj Sanur's land.

== Name ==
In Arabic, marj translates as the "fertile valley" or "meadow". The valley is named after the village of Sanur, one of seven Palestinian villages that border the valley.

== Geography ==
Marj Sanur's maximum length is 7.5 kilometers and maximum width is 3.5 kilometers. The average elevation in the valley is between 350 and 360 meters above sea level, with the highest elevation at 370 meters and the lowest elevation at 348 meters. Surrounding the valley on all sides are mountains and hills with a range of elevation from 450 meters above sea level to Mount Hureish, which has an elevation of 764 meters above sea level. Marj Sanur is also a seasonal lake, usually between December and April, as the basin has no drainage outlet. It typically becomes flooded when rainfall is higher than 600 millimeters per year. There are five entrances into Marj Sanur.

Its total area is roughly 20 square kilometers, while its drainage basin is about 55 square kilometers, most of which is in the Jenin Governorate, with two square kilometers extending into the Tubas Governorate. Marj Sanur abuts the Qabatiya Mountains to the north, the Zawiya Hills to the west and the Musheirif Highlands to the south. Further to the northwest is the Sahl Arraba valley and further to the east, past the towns of Aqqaba and Tubas, is the Jordan Valley.

Seven villages border the valley: Sanur, Meithalun, Siris, al-Judeida, Sir, Misilyah and Zawiya. Meithalun is the largest village around the valley and it has the largest share of Marj Sanur's land. The larger towns of Qabatiya and Jenin are located further north of Marj Sanur.

== History ==
Zertal suggested that Majr Sanur was the territory of the Milcah clan of the Israelite tribe of Manasseh during the Iron Age. He also proposed that Khirbet Kheibar, an archeological site and tell located on a hill overlooking Meithalun, served as the capital of Milcha's territory during the Iron Age.

== Bibliography ==
- Merkel, Broder (2002). Selected Contributions to Applied Geology in the Jordan Rift Valley. Technische Universität Bergakademie. ISBN 9783860121627.
- Robinson, E.; Smith, E. (1841). Biblical Researches in Palestine, Mount Sinai and Arabia Petraea: A Journal of Travels in the year 1838. Vol. 3. Boston: Crocker & Brewster.
- Zereini, Fathi (2013). Water in the Middle East and in North Africa: Resources, Protection and Management. Springer Science & Business Media. p. 72. ISBN 9783540207719.
- Zertal, A. (2004). The Manasseh Hill Country Survey. Vol. 1. Boston: BRILL. ISBN 9004137564.
