= Mount Hureish =

- Jabal Hureish

Highest point
- Elevation: 764 m (2,507 ft)
- Coordinates: 32°19′44″N 35°15′12″E

Geography
- Location: Jenin Governorate, West Bank, Palestine
- Parent range: Musheirif Range, Jabal Nablus (Samarian Highlands)

Mount Hureish is a mountain in the northern West Bank, part of the broader Jabal Nablus (Samarian Hills) range. It abuts the Marj Sanur valley to the south and its peak is 764 metres (2,507 ft) above sea level, making it the tallest mountain in the Jenin area, and the sixth highest peak in the Palestine. Mount Hureish is a part of the Musheirif Range, which includes other mountains such as Mount Abu Yazid (724 meters) and Mount 'Ilan (588 meters).

From Mount Hureish, Mount Ebal could be seen to the south and the Wadi Ara plain could be seen to the northwest. At its western foot is the Palestinian village of Jaba', and Meithalun and Siris are the closest villages to the east.

== Tomb of Sheikh Hureish ==
The mountain is named after the tomb of Sheikh Hureish, a wali (Muslim holy person), which is situated at the mountain's summit. The tomb is built of quality stone and consists of three rooms and a courtyard attached to the structure's eastern side. Arches support the tomb's ceiling. Large Roman or Byzantine-era dressed, stone blocks make up the base of the tomb's southern wall.

The ruins surrounding the tomb cover an area of one dunam. Other ruined structures include a cistern about 50 meters south of the tomb and a cistern about 100 meters to the southeast.

The French geographer Victor Guérin, who visited the area in 1878, referred to the tomb of Sheikh Hureish, writing that on "a high hill with steep slopes we saw a Sheikh's tomb called Waly Kheish, to where local people comes as pilgrims". At that time, Guerin noted, the tomb was topped by a white dome and could be "seen from afar".

== Bibliography ==
- Guérin, V. (1874). Description Géographique Historique et Archéologique de la Palestine (in French). Vol. 2: Samarie, pt. 1. Paris: L'Imprimerie Nationale.
- Palmer, E. H. (1881). The Survey of Western Palestine: Arabic and English Name Lists Collected During the Survey by Lieutenants Conder and Kitchener, R. E. Transliterated and Explained by E.H. Palmer. Committee of the Palestine Exploration Fund.
- Zertal, A. (2004). The Manasseh Hill Country Survey. Vol. 1. Boston: BRILL. ISBN 9004137564.
