= Ajjah =

Village in Jenin Governorate, West Bank

- Municipality type C

Arabic transcription(s)
  - Arabic: عجّه
  - Latin: Ajjah (official) ’Ajja (unofficial)
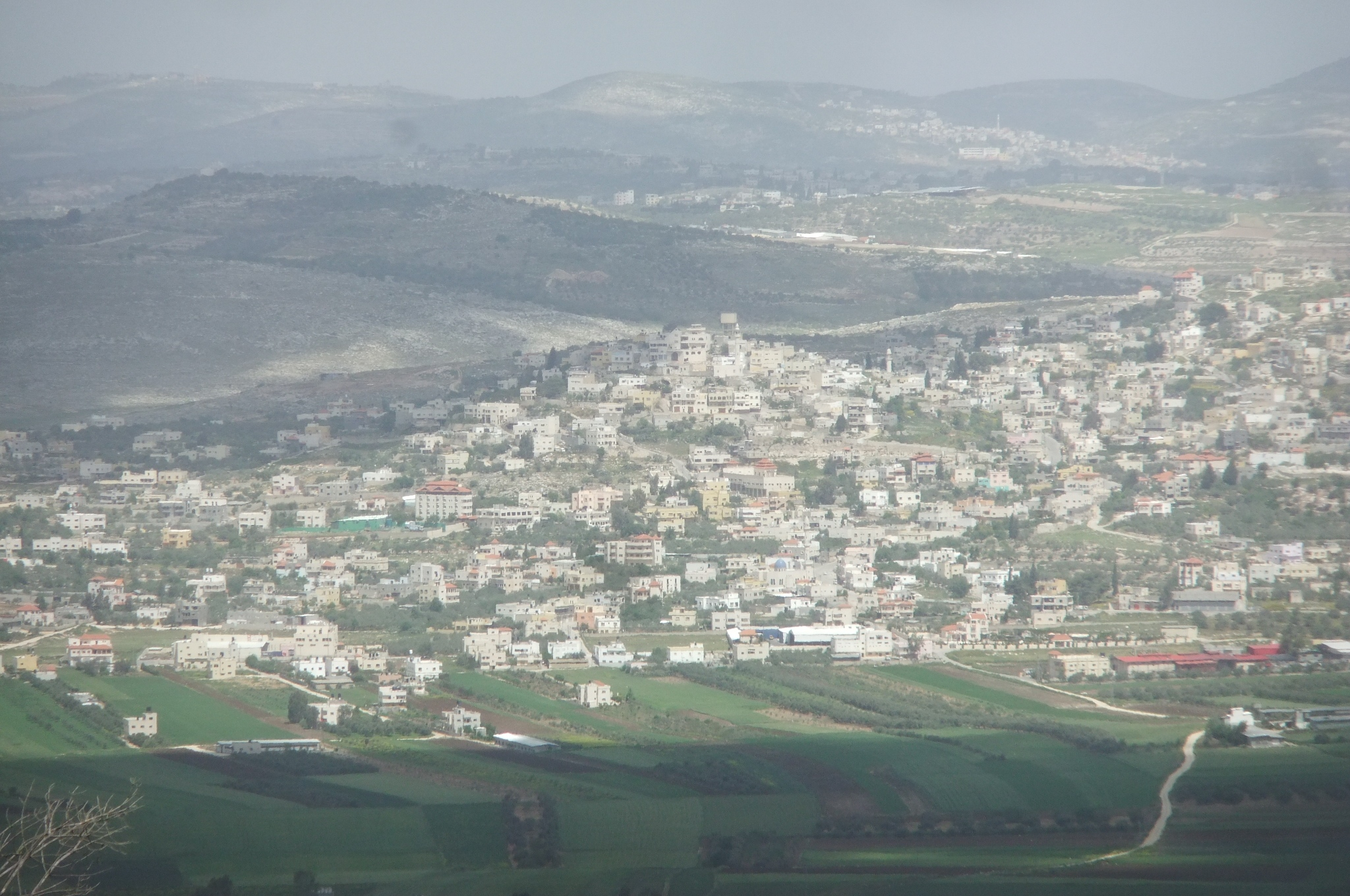
- Ajjah, 2013

- Location of Ajjah within Palestine
- Coordinates: 32°21′42″N 35°11′46″E
- Palestine grid: 168/196
- State: State of Palestine
- Governorate: Jenin

Government
  - Type: Municipality

Population (2017)
  - Total: 6,162
- Name meaning: Ajjeh, from personal name

Ajjah (Arabic: عجّه) is a Palestinian village in the Jenin Governorate of the State of Palestine, in the northern West Bank, located 19 kilometers southwest of Jenin. According to the Palestinian Central Bureau of Statistics, the village had a population of 6,162 in 2017.

== History ==
It has been suggested that this was Aak, or Aaj in the list of places conquered by Thutmose III.

Pottery sherds from Middle Bronze IIB, IA I, IA II, Persian, Hellenistic, early and late Roman, Byzantine and early Muslim eras have been found here.

In 1179, Casale Age was mentioned in Crusader sources as among the villages whose revenue were given to the Zion Abbey by Pope Alexander III.

=== Ottoman era ===
Ajjah, like the rest of Palestine, was incorporated into the Ottoman Empire in 1517. In the census of 1596 it was a part of the nahiya ("subdistrict") of Jabal Sami which was under the administration of the liwa ("district") of Nablus. The village had a population of 13 households, all Muslim. The villagers paid a fixed tax-rate of 33,3% on wheat, barley, summer crops, olive trees, beehives and/or goats, in addition to occasional revenues, a tax for people of liwa Nablus, and a press for olive oil or grape syrup; a total of 3,612 akçe. Pottery sherds from the Ottoman era have also been found here. En-Nabulsi (1641 – 1731), noted Ajjah as "a village on the road from Fahme and er-Rameh".

In 1830, the people of Ajjah fought against the army of Emir Bashir Shihab II during the siege of Sanur. In 1838, 'Ajjeh was noted as being in the District of esh-Sha'rawiyeh esh-Shurkiyeh, the eastern part.

In 1870, Victor Guérin described it as a village on a hill with 500 inhabitants, surrounded by olive groves. In 1871 (1288 AH), an Ottoman census listed the village in the nahiya (sub-district) of al-Sha'rawiyya al-Sharqiyya.

In 1882, the PEF's Survey of Western Palestine described Ajjeh as a small village of ancient appearance, on the edge of a hill with olive groves below and a cistern to the southeast.

=== British mandate era ===
In the 1922 census of Palestine, conducted by the British Mandate authorities, the village had a population of 500 Muslims, increasing in the 1931 census to 643 Muslims, in 142 houses.

In the 1944/5 statistics the population of Ajja was 890 Muslims, with a total of 11,027 dunams of land, according to an official land and population survey. Of this, 737 dunams were used for plantations and irrigable land, 5,605 dunams for cereals, while 23 dunams were built-up (urban) land.

=== Jordanian era ===
In the wake of the 1948 Arab–Israeli War, and after the 1949 Armistice Agreements, Ajjah came under Jordanian rule.

The Jordanian census of 1961 found 1,190 inhabitants.

=== Post-1967 ===
Since the 1967 Six-Day War, Ajjah has been under Israeli occupation. In 1978, the Medieval fortress still crowned the summit of the village, and around it were buildings from the 16th and 17th CE, and two mosques. Under the Oslo Accords, most of this town was assigned to Area A, with political control and security responsibilities assigned to the Palestinian National Authority.

== Demography ==
=== Local origins ===
Residents of Ajjah originally came from many locations, including Jerusalem, Galilee (Alma), and Beita.

== Bibliography ==
- Barron, J.B., ed. (1923). Palestine: Report and General Abstracts of the Census of 1922. Government of Palestine.
- Conder, C.R.; Kitchener, H.H. (1882). The Survey of Western Palestine: Memoirs of the Topography, Orography, Hydrography, and Archaeology. Vol. 2. London: Committee of the Palestine Exploration Fund.
- Conder, C.R. (1876). "Palestine before Joshua". Quarterly Statement - Palestine Exploration Fund. 8: 140–148.
- Dauphin, C. (1998). La Palestine byzantine, Peuplement et Populations. BAR International Series 726 (in French). Vol. III : Catalogue. Oxford: Archeopress. ISBN 0-860549-05-4.
- Government of Jordan, Department of Statistics (1964). First Census of Population and Housing. Volume I: Final Tables; General Characteristics of the Population (PDF).
- Government of Palestine, Department of Statistics (1945). Village Statistics, April, 1945.
- Guérin, V. (1875). Description Géographique Historique et Archéologique de la Palestine (in French). Vol. 2: Samarie, pt. 2. Paris: L'Imprimerie Nationale.
- Hadawi, S. (1970). Village Statistics of 1945: A Classification of Land and Area ownership in Palestine. Palestine Liberation Organization Research Center. Archived from the original on 2018-12-08.
- Hütteroth, W.-D.; Abdulfattah, K. (1977). Historical Geography of Palestine, Transjordan and Southern Syria in the Late 16th Century. Erlanger Geographische Arbeiten, Sonderband 5. Erlangen, Germany: Vorstand der Fränkischen Geographischen Gesellschaft. ISBN 3-920405-41-2.
- Mills, E., ed. (1932). Census of Palestine 1931. Population of Villages, Towns and Administrative Areas. Jerusalem: Government of Palestine.
- Palmer, E.H. (1881). The Survey of Western Palestine: Arabic and English Name Lists Collected During the Survey by Lieutenants Conder and Kitchener, R. E. Transliterated and Explained by E.H. Palmer. Committee of the Palestine Exploration Fund.
- Robinson, E.; Smith, Eli (1841). Biblical Researches in Palestine, Mount Sinai and Arabia Petraea: A Journal of Travels in the year 1838. Vol. 3. Boston: Crocker & Brewster.
- Röhricht, R. (1893). (RRH) Regesta regni Hierosolymitani (MXCVII-MCCXCI) (in Latin). Berlin: Libraria Academica Wageriana.
- Zertal, A. (2004). The Manasseh Hill Country Survey. Vol. 1. Boston: BRILL. ISBN 9004137564.
