= Sanur Citadel =

- قلعة صانور
- Sanur, Jenin Governorate, West Bank in Palestine
- Entrance to Sanur Citadel

Site information
- Type: Citadel

Site history
- Built: 18th century
- Materials: Stone

Sanur Citadel (Arabic: قلعة صانور) is a historic fortified complex in Sanur, in the Jenin Governorate of the West Bank. It stands on elevated ground overlooking the surrounding countryside and was the fortified seat of the Jarrar family, a prominent rural family in Ottoman Palestine.

== History ==
The citadel developed during the 18th century, when Sanur became the principal fortified seat of the Jarrar family. Sources differ on the exact date of its construction. The Palestinian Heritage Trail dates the fortress to around 1700, while other historical accounts associate major construction with Sheikh Yusuf al-Jarrar in 1785. (paltrails.ps) The fortifications were largely destroyed in 1831 during the campaign of Abdullah Pasha, the Ottoman governor of Sidon, against the local leaders of Jabal Nablus.

== Architecture ==
The citadel consists of surviving sections of defensive walls and towers, together with historic buildings and underground spaces. Its elevated position formed an important part of its defensive character. The surrounding historic settlement also contains wells and other traditional structures associated with the fortified complex.

== Significance ==
Sanur Citadel is an example of the fortified rural centers associated with powerful local families in Ottoman Palestine. Sanur was one of the fortified throne villages that served as centers of local political authority during the late Ottoman period.

== See also ==
- Sanur, Jenin
- Jenin
- Jenin Governorate
- Ottoman Palestine
- Jarrar family
- Throne villages

== Gallery ==
Informational plaque at Sanur Citadel

Entrance to Sanur Citadel

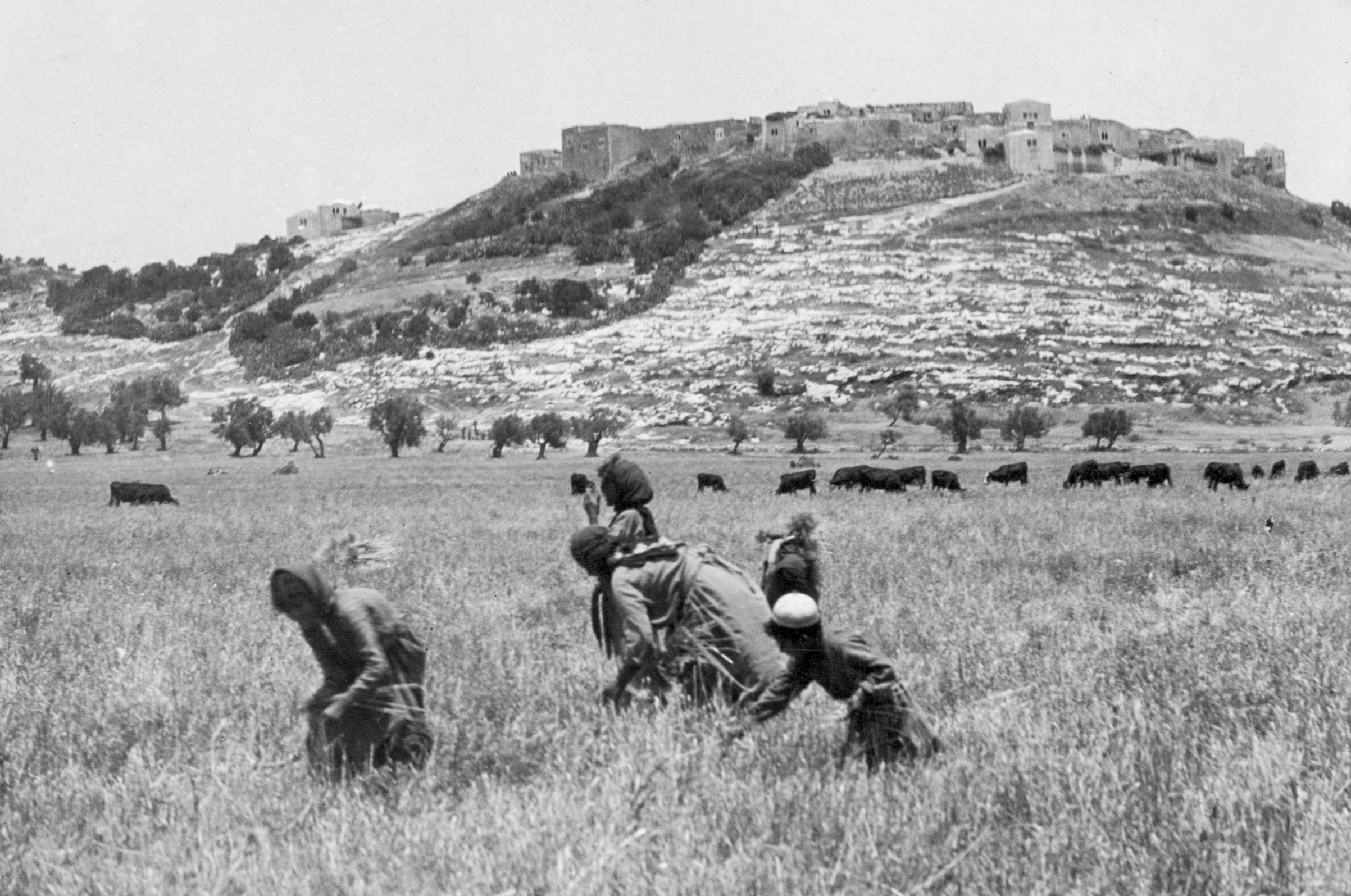
Sanur, Jenin ca 1908
