= Sir, Jenin =

Village in Jenin Governorate, West Bank

Sir
- Municipality type D (Village council)

Arabic transcription(s)
  - Arabic: صير
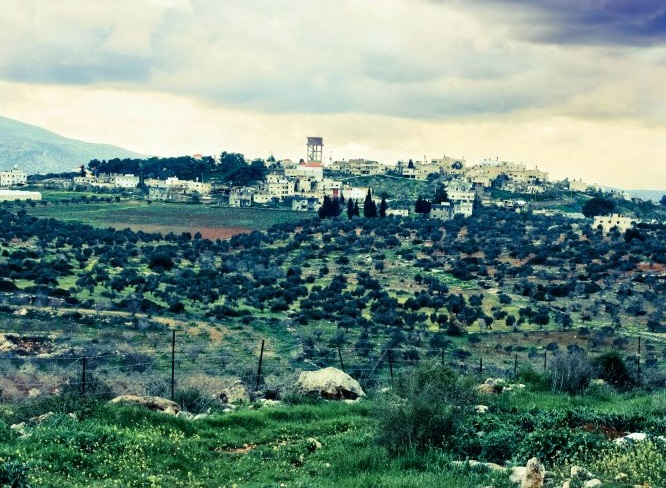
- Sir in the winter

- Location of Sir within Palestine
- Coordinates: 32°21′49″N 35°18′52″E
- Palestine grid: 179/196
- State: State of Palestine
- Governorate: Jenin

Government
  - Type: Village council

Population (2017)
  - Total: 857
- Name meaning: The fold

Sir (Arabic: صير) is a Palestinian town in the Jenin Governorate of Palestine, in the West Bank, located 18 kilometers south of Jenin. According to the Palestinian Central Bureau of Statistics, the town had a population of 769 inhabitants in mid-year 2006 and 857 by 2017.

== Location ==
Sir is located on the southern part of Marj Sanur, together with Meithalun.

== History ==
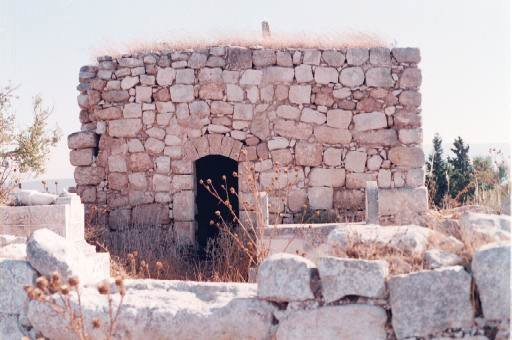
El Nabi Dheeb, Sir

SWP noted: "The ruin west of the village has the appearance of an ancient site. Foundations, cisterns cut in the rock, and heaps of stones among bushes."

Pottery sherds from the Persian, early and late Roman, and Byzantine eras have been found here.

Sir is identified with Kfar Sir (Hebrew: כפר ציר), mentioned in the 6th-7th century Mosaic of Reḥob as a Jewish village in the region of Sebastia inhabited mostly by non-Jews and, therefore, agricultural produce obtained from the area could be taken by Jews without the normal restrictions imposed during the Sabbatical years, or the need for tithing.

A Crusader estate named Casale Syrorum, whose rights were affirmed in the year 1165/1166 CE by Amalric of Jerusalem, was located here.

=== Ottoman era ===
Sir, like the rest of Palestine, was incorporated into the Ottoman Empire in 1517, and in the census of 1596 it was a part of the nahiya ("subdistrict") of Jabal Sami which was under the administration of the Nablus Sanjak. The village had a population of 31 households and 4 bachelors, all Muslim. The villagers paid a fixed tax-rate of 33,3% on agricultural products, such as wheat, barley, summer crops, olive trees, beehives and/or goats, in addition to occasional revenues, a tax for people of liwa Nablus, and a press for olive oil or grape syrup; a total of 7,832 akçe.

In 1870, Victor Guérin noted it as a small village on a high hill. There were many cisterns and tombs cut out from the rock, which convinced Guérin that the place was ancient. The inhabitant, which numbered 150, had a mosque.

In 1882, the PEF's Survey of Western Palestine (SWP) described Sir as: "A small village on a knoll amid brushwood, with a large house on the west."

=== British Mandate era ===
In the 1922 census of Palestine, conducted by the British Mandate authorities, Sir had 194 Muslims inhabitants, increasing in the 1931 census to 233; 2 Christians and 231 Muslims, in a total of 42 houses.

In the 1945 statistics the population of Sir was 290, all Muslims, with 12,499 dunams of land, according to an official land and population survey. Of this, 1,908 dunams were used for plantations and irrigable land, 6,045 dunams for cereals, while 10 dunams were built-up (urban) land and 4,536 dunams were classified as "non-cultivable".

=== Jordanian era ===
In the wake of the 1948 Arab–Israeli War, and after the 1949 Armistice Agreements, Sir came under Jordanian rule.

The Jordanian census of 1961 found 470 inhabitants.

=== Post-1967 ===
Since the Six-Day War in 1967, Sir has been under Israeli occupation.

== Bibliography ==
- Barron, J.B., ed. (1923). Palestine: Report and General Abstracts of the Census of 1922. Government of Palestine.
- Conder, C.R.; Kitchener, H.H. (1882). The Survey of Western Palestine: Memoirs of the Topography, Orography, Hydrography, and Archaeology. Vol. 2. London: Committee of the Palestine Exploration Fund.
- Dauphin, C. (1998). La Palestine byzantine, Peuplement et Populations. BAR International Series 726 (in French). Vol. III : Catalogue. Oxford: Archeopress. ISBN 0-860549-05-4.
- Government of Jordan, Department of Statistics (1964). First Census of Population and Housing. Volume I: Final Tables; General Characteristics of the Population (PDF).
- Government of Palestine, Department of Statistics (1945). Village Statistics, April, 1945.
- Guérin, V. (1874). Description Géographique Historique et Archéologique de la Palestine (in French). Vol. 2: Samarie, pt. 1. Paris: L'Imprimerie Nationale.
- Hadawi, S. (1970). Village Statistics of 1945: A Classification of Land and Area ownership in Palestine. Palestine Liberation Organization Research Center.
- Hütteroth, W.-D.; Abdulfattah, K. (1977). Historical Geography of Palestine, Transjordan and Southern Syria in the Late 16th Century. Erlanger Geographische Arbeiten, Sonderband 5. Erlangen, Germany: Vorstand der Fränkischen Geographischen Gesellschaft. ISBN 3-920405-41-2.
- Mills, E., ed. (1932). Census of Palestine 1931. Population of Villages, Towns and Administrative Areas. Jerusalem: Government of Palestine.
- Palmer, E.H. (1881). The Survey of Western Palestine: Arabic and English Name Lists Collected During the Survey by Lieutenants Conder and Kitchener, R. E. Transliterated and Explained by E.H. Palmer. Committee of the Palestine Exploration Fund.
- Röhricht, R. (1904). (RRH Ad) Regesta regni Hierosolymitani Additamentum (in Latin). Berlin: Libraria Academica Wageriana.
- Saulcy, L.F. de (1854). Narrative of a journey round the Dead Sea, and in the Bible lands, in 1850 and 1851. Vol. 1, new edition. London: R. Bentley.
- Zertal, A. (2007). The Manasseh Hill Country Survey. Vol. 2. Boston: BRILL. ISBN 978-9004163690.
