= Throne villages =

Throne villages (Arabic: قرى الكراسي Arabic transliteration: qura al-karasi; singular qaryat al-kursi) were villages in the central mountain areas of Palestine (today making up the modern-day West Bank) that served as seats of political and military power for the local leaders (sheikhs) of rural subdistricts (nahiya, pl. nawahi) primarily during the latter half of Ottoman rule.

== Political and social functions ==
There were roughly two dozen throne villages within the subdistricts that made up the central mountain areas of Palestine. For the most part, they were relatively distant from the main urban centers of the region (Nablus, Jerusalem and Hebron), which had their own separate administrators. Many were strategically located along trade routes or served as centers of olive oil production.

In the rural highlands, neighboring villages were grouped together into administrative subdistricts or virtual sheikhdoms, in which one or more throne villages, which were typically larger in population and landholdings, served as the socio-political and economic centers for the lesser villages. The throne village was the administrative center for the dominant clan of the area, and some were also branch centers for various Sufi orders, particularly the Qadiriyya. The leading clans of the area maintained connections with other clans through patronage networks and alliances, and had similar relationships with urban mercantile clans. The sheikhs' relationship to the authorities stemmed from their role as local tax collectors on behalf of the government.

The sheikhs of the prominent rural landowning clans ultimately based their power on violence or the threat thereof. However, force was rarely used due to the durability of patronage networks, whereby the sheikhs offered the local peasantry protection in exchange for loyalty. This network further increased the power of the sheikhs, who could effectively restrict local and regional trade routes with their ability to mobilize peasant militias. Their allegiance with the peasantry was also solidified due to the presence of kinsmen in lesser villages, intermarriage with large peasant clans, and the sheikhs' role as arbiters of disputes or enforcers of customary law.

The throne villages played a key role in maintaining the autonomy of the region from direct Ottoman rule for much of the 18th and 19th centuries. The Jarrar family's fortress village of Sanur, continually served as the principal obstacle to the attempts by the governors of Acre, Sidon and Damascus to extend their authority to the central highlands of Palestine, particularly Jabal Nablus. In response to Napoleon's siege of Acre in 1799, the ruling clans of the throne villages dispatched forces to counter the French invasion. The throne villages also joined forces during the 1834 revolt against Muhammad Ali of Egypt's conscription orders.

During the second half of the 19th century, Ottoman reforms brought changes to the political administration of the highlands region, with the central Ottoman authorities shifting their reliance on governing the region to the urban notables and appointed mukhtars (leaders of individual villages). This signified the loss of power of the rural sheikhs and the influence of their throne villages all but disappeared by the beginning of the 20th century.

== Architecture ==
Each throne village contained a fortress-like palace where the local sheikh would reside. The palace architecture were influenced by the building style of the urban centers as opposed to the simpler architecture of peasant homes. This was a reflection of the close relationship between the rural sheikhs and the urban notables.

== List of throne villages ==
Village	Subdistrict	Clan
Abu Dis	Wadiyah	Erekat
Abwein	Bani Zeid	Al-Sahwil
Arraba	Bilad al-Haritha	Abd al-Hadi
Beit Iksa	Jabal al-Quds	Al-Kasawni
Beit 'Itab	Al-Arqub	Al-Lahham
Bayt Jibrin	Jabal al-Khalil al-Tahta	Al-'Azza
Beit Wazan	Jurat Amra	Qasim
Beita	Mashareq al-Beitawi	Duwaykat
Beitunia	Jabal al-Quds	Al-Beituni
Al-Bireh	Jabal al-Quds	Al-Birawi
Burqa	Wadi al-Sha'ir	Al-Burqawi and Al-Mir'i
Deir Ghassaneh	Bani Zeid	Barghouti
Deir Ibzi	Bani Harith	Al-Ka'raja
Deir Istiya	Jamma'in	Qasim
Dura	Jabal al-Khalil al-Fauqa	'Amr
Jaba'	Jabal Sami	Jarrar
Jalud	Mashareq al-Beitawi	Mansur
Jammain	Jammain	Qasim and Rayyan
Kafr Malik	Bani Salem	Al-Daykah
Kur	Bani Sa'b	Jayyusi
Majdal Yaba	Jamma'in	Rayyan
al-Mazra'a ash-Sharqiya	Bani Murra	Al-Ansawiyah
Ni'lin	Al-Arqub	Al-Khawaja
Qaryat al-Inab	Bani Malik	Abu Ghosh
Ras Karkar	Al-Arqub	Ibn Simhan
Sanur	Sha'rawiyah	Jarrar
Sebastia	Wadi al-Sha'ir	Al-Kayed
Al-Walaja	Bani Hasan	Al-Absiyeh

== See also ==
- Peasants' Revolt of 1834 (Palestine)
- Deir Hanna

== Bibliography ==
- Amiry, S. (1987). Space, Kinship and Gender: The Social Dimension of Peasant Architecture in Palestine. University of Edinburgh-Faculty of Social Sciences. hdl:1842/6987.
- Amiry, S.; Tamari, V. (1989). The Palestinian Village Home. London: Trustees of the British Museum. ISBN 9780714115993.
- Doumani, B. (1995). Rediscovering Palestine: Merchants and Peasants in Jabal Nablus. University of California Press.
- Irving, Sarah (2012). Palestine. Bradt Travel Guides. ISBN 9781841623672.
- Macalister, R. A. S.; Masterman, E. W. G. (1905). "Occasional Papers on the Modern inhabitants of Palestine, part I & part II". Quarterly Statement - Palestine Exploration Fund. 37: 343–356.
