= Anzah =

Anzah, 'Anza
- Municipality type D (Village council)

Arabic transcription(s)
  - Arabic: عنزه ، عنزا
  - Latin: A'nza (official)
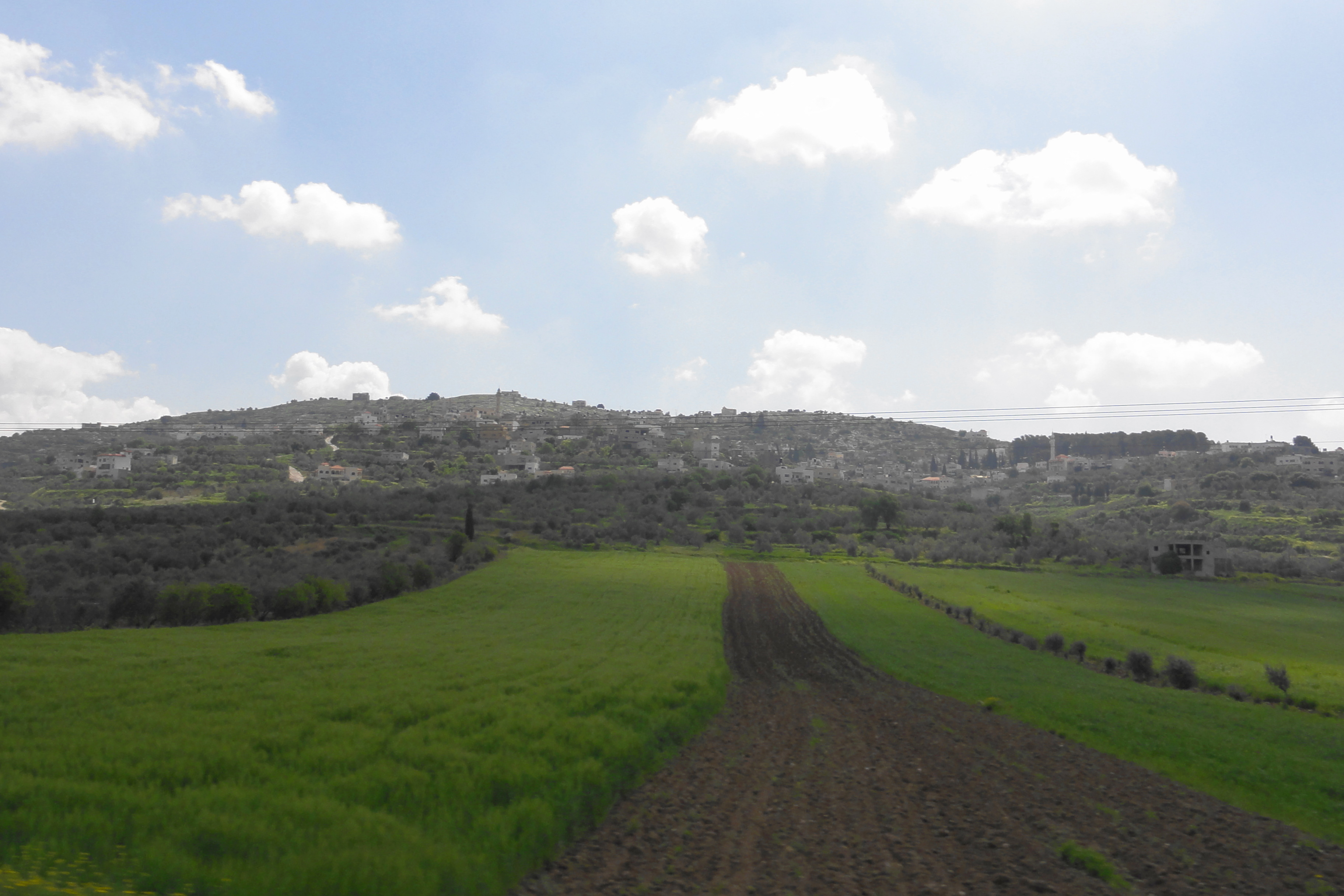

- Location of Anzah, 'Anza within Palestine
- Coordinates: 32°21′34″N 35°13′11″E
- Palestine grid: 170/196
- State: State of Palestine
- Governorate: Jenin

Government
  - Type: Village council

Area
  - Total: 4.7 km^{2} (1.8 sq mi)

Population (2017)
  - Total: 1,938
  - Density: 410/km^{2} (1,100/sq mi)
- Name meaning: The goats or hill

Anzah or 'Anza (Arabic: عنزة) is a Palestinian village in the located 18 km southwest of the city of Jenin in the northern West Bank. Its total land area consists of 4,740 dunams of which nearly a 1/4 is covered with olive orchards. According to the Palestinian Central Bureau of Statistics, the town had a population of 1,938 inhabitants in 2017.

== History ==
Pottery sherds from the Byzantine, early Muslim and the Medieval eras have been found here.

=== Ottoman era ===
In 1830, during the Ottoman era, when the forces of Bashir Shihab II besieged Sanur, they were harassed by the people of Anzah. In 1838, 'Anaza was noted as being in the District of esh-Sha'rawiyeh esh-Shurkiyeh, the eastern part.

In 1870, Victor Guérin found it "situated on a hill and counting scarcely a hundred inhabitants today. A belt of olive trees surrounds it."

In 1882, the PEF's Survey of Western Palestine described it as: "A village of ancient appearance on a hill perched above the plain, the houses descending the slope on the south-east. It has two wells down the hill and a good olive grove near the road on the south. The houses are of stone."

=== British Mandate era ===
In the 1922 census of Palestine, conducted by the British Mandate authorities, the village had a population of 537 Muslims, increasing slightly in the 1931 census to 642 Muslims, with 137 houses.

In the 1944/5 statistics, the population was 880 Muslims, with a total of 4,740 dunams of land, according to an official land and population survey. Of this, 958 dunams were used for plantations and irrigable land, 2,110 dunams for cereals, while 16 dunams were built-up (urban) land.

=== Jordanian era ===
In the wake of the 1948 Arab–Israeli War, and after the 1949 Armistice Agreements, Anzah came under Jordanian rule.

In 1961, the population of 'Anze was 1,011.

=== Post-1967 ===
Since the Six-Day War in 1967, Anzah has been held under Israeli occupation. According to the Israeli census of that year, the population of Anza stood at 807, of whom 13 were registered as having come from Israel. Under the Oslo Accords, most of this town was assigned to Area B, with political control assigned to the Palestinian National Authority.

== Demography ==
The village has six major families: Obaid, Sadaqa, Barahmeh, Ataya, Khader, and Omour.

Anzah's residents has origins in Yatta. They say they have longstanding roots in the area.

== See also ==
- List of cities in Palestinian Authority areas

== Bibliography ==
- Barron, J.B., ed. (1923). Palestine: Report and General Abstracts of the Census of 1922. Government of Palestine.
- Conder, C.R.; Kitchener, H.H. (1882). The Survey of Western Palestine: Memoirs of the Topography, Orography, Hydrography, and Archaeology. Vol. 2. London: Committee of the Palestine Exploration Fund.
- Government of Jordan, Department of Statistics (1964). First Census of Population and Housing. Volume I: Final Tables; General Characteristics of the Population (PDF).
- Government of Palestine, Department of Statistics (1945). Village Statistics, April, 1945.
- Guérin, V. (1875). Description Géographique Historique et Archéologique de la Palestine (in French). Vol. 2: Samarie, pt. 2. Paris: L'Imprimerie Nationale.
- Hadawi, S. (1970). Village Statistics of 1945: A Classification of Land and Area ownership in Palestine. Palestine Liberation Organization Research Center. Archived from the original on 2018-12-08.
- Mills, E., ed. (1932). Census of Palestine 1931. Population of Villages, Towns and Administrative Areas. Jerusalem: Government of Palestine.
- Palmer, E.H. (1881). The Survey of Western Palestine: Arabic and English Name Lists Collected During the Survey by Lieutenants Conder and Kitchener, R. E. Transliterated and Explained by E.H. Palmer. Committee of the Palestine Exploration Fund.
- Robinson, E.; Smith, Eli (1841). Biblical Researches in Palestine, Mount Sinai and Arabia Petraea: A Journal of Travels in the year 1838. Vol. 3. Boston: Crocker & Brewster.
- Shehabi, Kheidar (1969). Lubnanfi Ahd el-Amraa el-Shehabiih (in Arabic). Vol. III. Beyrouth.
- Zertal, A. (2004). The Manasseh Hill Country Survey. Vol. 1. Boston: BRILL. ISBN 9004137564.
