= Ancient underground quarry, Jordan Valley =

Archaeological site north of Jericho, State of Palestine

Ancient quarry
- Location within the West Bank
- 31.912444°N 35.462181°E
- Type: quarry
- Periods: Roman to Byzantine period
- Location: near Jericho, West Bank
- Region: Jordan Valley

History
- Built: First century CE

Site notes
- Height: 4 m (13 ft)
- Length: 100 m (330 ft)
- Width: 40 m (130 ft)
- Area: 0.4 ha (0.99 acres)
- Archaeologists: Adam Zertal
- Management: Israel

An ancient underground quarry in the Jordan Valley was discovered in 2009 by University of Haifa archeologists. The quarry is located about 3 miles (5 km) north of Jericho, West Bank.

== Location and structure ==
The quarry is located in the desert north of Jericho, 10 metres (40 ft) beneath the surface. It spans more than 1-acre (0.4-hectare) and its main hall is supported by 22 pillars.

== Iconography ==
Various symbols, including Byzantine crosses, a zodiac-like symbol and Roman numerals are engraved upon the pillars. An etched Roman legion's pennant indicates that it was used by the Roman Army.

== History and purpose ==
The quarry was created around 2,000 years ago and served as a large quarry during the Roman era. The chamber's run as a quarry likely lasted approximately 400 to 500 years. It may subsequently have been used as a monastery and some believe it may have marked a biblical site which became sacred to ancient Christians. Others, while admitting the possibility that the quarry could have been associated with monastic activity, claimed that the etched crosses alone cannot confirm the existence of a church, since they may have been made by random pilgrims, which was a common phenomenon at the time.

=== "Dodekaliton" theory ===
Adam Zertal, who led the expedition, contends that the spot may mark the ancient site named Galgala. Referring to the Byzantine era Madaba map, he notes a site called Galgala is depicted next to an inscription that reads "Dodekaliton", which translates as "Twelve Stones". The place is marked at a distance from Jericho that matches the quarry's distance from the city. The map shows a church next to Dodekaliton and today the remains of two ancient churches are located near the cave. Zertal suggests that the meaning of "Twelve Stones" relates to the biblical verses that describe the twelve stones that the Children of Israel placed in Gilgal and may be understood as a reference to the quarry that was dug in the place the Byzantines identified as Gilgal.
