= Zawiya, Jenin =

Az-Zawiya
- Municipality type C

Arabic transcription(s)
  - Arabic: الزاوية
- Location of Az-Zawiya within Palestine
- Coordinates: 32°22′28″N 35°13′56″E
- Palestine grid: 172/198
- State: State of Palestine
- Governorate: Jenin

Government
  - Type: Municipality

Population (2017)
  - Total: 1,006
- Name meaning: The corner, or hermitage

Az-Zawiya (Arabic: الزاوية; also spelled Zawiyeh) is a Palestinian village in the Jenin Governorate in the northern West Bank, located south of Jenin. According to the Palestinian Central Bureau of Statistics (PCBS) census, the village had a population of 770 in 2007 and 1,006 by 2017.

== History ==
Pottery sherds from Early Bronze Age I and II, Iron Age II, Persian, Hellenistic and early Roman have been found here.

Tombs and a columbarium have been cut into the rock, and ceramics from the Byzantine era have also been found here, as have sherds from early Muslim and Medieval eras.

=== Ottoman era ===
In 1517, Zawiya was incorporated into the Ottoman Empire with the rest of Palestine. In 1596, it appeared in Ottoman tax registers as a village named Zawiyat, or alternatively Sayh Mohammad Rifa'i, in the nahiya (subdistrict) of Jabal Sami in the Nablus Sanjak. It had a population of 12 households, all Muslim.

In 1870, Victor Guérin described as having a small number of houses, situated on a mound.

In 1882, the PEF's Survey of Western Palestine described it as: "A hamlet on a hill side, with a well to the west. It seems to take its name from the sudden twist in the road near the place."

=== British Mandate era ===
In the 1922 census of Palestine conducted by the British Mandate authorities, Zawieh had a population 45 Muslims, increasing in the 1931 census to 76 Muslim, in a total of 17 houses.

In 1945 statistics the population was 120 Muslims, with 1,066 dunams of land, according to an official land and population survey. Of this, 310 dunams were used for cereals, while 4 dunams were built-up, urban land.

=== Jordanian era ===
Following the 1948 Arab–Israeli War, and the subsequent 1949 Armistice Agreements, Zawiya came under Jordanian rule.

In 1961, the population of Zawiya was 152.

=== Israeli occupation ===
Since the Six-Day War in 1967, Zawiya has been under Israeli occupation, and according to the Israeli census of that year, the population of Zawiya stood at 239, of whom 13 were registered as having come from Israel.

On Saturday 9 January 2016 the owner of a local trading company, Said Abu Al-Wafa (35), was shot dead by Israeli soldiers at the Beka'ot roadblock.

== Holy sites ==
To the south of Zawiya, there exists a holy site named ash-Sheikh abu-Sha'ir, which contains a heap of stones revered by the local people. According to legend, it is named after a sheikh was a descendant of Ali Abu Al-Wafaa, who is buried within the village itself. Local lore holds that this sheikh allowed his hair to grow wildly, hence earning him the name abu-Sha'ir.

It is said that abu-Sha'ir fought alongside Muslim armies, but upon returning to the village from war one day, he discovered his wife in the hands of another man. Enraged, he killed them both and severed the man's testicles. He then proceeded to the site of previous battles and threw the severed body parts into the sky, vowing to live the rest of his life away from women and the troubles of the world, wherever they fell.

In Jewish tradition, the heap of stones and trees at this site is believed to mark where King Ahaziah's messengers met the prophet Elijah, as described in II Kings.

== Bibliography ==
- Barron, J.B., ed. (1923). Palestine: Report and General Abstracts of the Census of 1922. Government of Palestine.
- Conder, C.R.; Kitchener, H.H. (1882). The Survey of Western Palestine: Memoirs of the Topography, Orography, Hydrography, and Archaeology. Vol. 2. London: Committee of the Palestine Exploration Fund.
- Dauphin, C. (1998). La Palestine byzantine, Peuplement et Populations. BAR International Series 726 (in French). Vol. III : Catalogue. Oxford: Archeopress. ISBN 0-860549-05-4.
- Government of Jordan, Department of Statistics (1964). First Census of Population and Housing. Volume I: Final Tables; General Characteristics of the Population (PDF).
- Government of Palestine, Department of Statistics (1945). Village Statistics, April, 1945.
- Guérin, V. (1875). Description Géographique Historique et Archéologique de la Palestine (in French). Vol. 2: Samarie, pt. 2. Paris: L'Imprimerie Nationale.
- Hadawi, S. (1970). Village Statistics of 1945: A Classification of Land and Area ownership in Palestine. Palestine Liberation Organization Research Center.
- Hütteroth, W.-D.; Abdulfattah, K. (1977). Historical Geography of Palestine, Transjordan and Southern Syria in the Late 16th Century. Erlanger Geographische Arbeiten, Sonderband 5. Erlangen, Germany: Vorstand der Fränkischen Geographischen Gesellschaft. ISBN 3-920405-41-2.
- Mills, E., ed. (1932). Census of Palestine 1931. Population of Villages, Towns and Administrative Areas. Jerusalem: Government of Palestine.
- Palmer, E.H. (1881). The Survey of Western Palestine: Arabic and English Name Lists Collected During the Survey by Lieutenants Conder and Kitchener, R. E. Transliterated and Explained by E.H. Palmer. Committee of the Palestine Exploration Fund.
- Zertal, A. (2004). The Manasseh Hill Country Survey. Vol. 1. Boston: BRILL. ISBN 9004137564.
