= Misilyah =

- Municipality type D (Village council)

Arabic transcription(s)
  - Arabic: مسلية
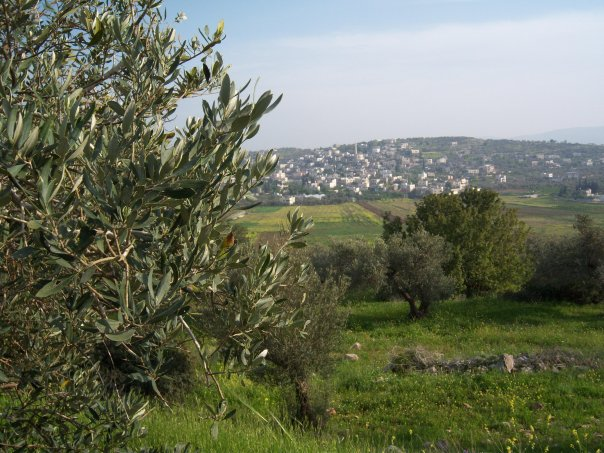

- Location of Misilyah within Palestine
- Coordinates: 32°23′12″N 35°17′17″E
- Palestine grid: 177/199
- State: State of Palestine
- Governorate: Jenin

Government
  - Type: Village council

Population (2017)
  - Total: 2,884
- Name meaning: 'an example', In Phænician: 'an image', in old Arabic it means: 'traces of a dwelling which are becoming effaced'

Misilyah (Arabic: مسلية), sometimes spelled Mithiliyeh and Misiliyeh, is a Palestinian village in the northern West Bank of the State of Palestine, located 14 kilometers south of the city of Jenin. According to the Palestinian Central Bureau of Statistics, the village had a population of 2,252 inhabitants in mid-year 2006 and 2,884 by 2017. The main agricultural crops cultivated in Misilya are olives, grapes, figs, and vegetables. Roman and Islamic ruins have been found in the village.

== Geography ==
Misilyah is situated in a small plain in the foothills of Jabal Faḳu'ah, or Mount Gilboa. The plain, Marj al-Gharaḳ, also spelled Merj el-Ghǔrǔk, which lacks any natural drainage, was described at the beginning of the 20th century as transforming into a large swamp during the rainy season, only to dry up in summer, when the resulting field was cultivated with grain.

== History ==
Pottery sherds from the late Roman, Byzantine, early Muslim and Medieval eras have been found here.

C. R. Conder suggested in the 1880s that Misilyah was ancient Bethulia, but Zertal, 2004, found no archeological evidence supporting this.

=== Ottoman era ===
Modern Misilyah was established sometime after the 16th century. It appears in tax records dating back to 1671. The locals of Qabatiya consider Misilyah to be an offshoot of their village, with some residents originating from nearby villages.

In 1838, Edward Robinson noted the village when he travelled in the region, as bordering the extremely fertile Marj Sanur. He listed it as part of the District of Haritheh, north of Nablus.

In 1870, Victor Guérin noted it, "sitting on the northern slopes of a hill planted with superb olive trees; at the bottom there is a fertile and well-cultivated plain."

In 1882, the PEF's Survey of Western Palestine described Meselieh: "A small village, with a detached portion to the north, and placed on a slope, with a hill to the south, and surrounded by good olive-groves, with an open valley called Wady el Melek (' the King's Valley') on the north. The water-supply is from wells, some of which have an ancient appearance. They are mainly supplied with rain-water."

=== British Mandate era ===
In the 1922 census of Palestine conducted by the British Mandate authorities, Meselayyeh had a population 190 Muslims, increasing in the 1931 census to 222 Muslim, in a total of 49 houses.

In the 1945 statistics the population was 330 Muslims, with a total of 9,038 dunams of land, according to an official land and population survey. Of this, 2,683 dunams were used for plantations and irrigable land, 2,592 dunams were for cereals, while a total of 23 dunams were built-up, urban land.

=== Jordanian era ===
In the wake of the 1948 Arab–Israeli War, and after the 1949 Armistice Agreements, Misilyah came under Jordanian rule.

In 1961, the population of Misilya was 606.

=== Post-1967 ===
After the Six-Day War in 1967, Misilyah has been under Israeli occupation.

On 17 January 2016 a 21 year old resident of Masliya was shot dead by Israeli soldiers.

== Bibliography ==
- Barron, J.B., ed. (1923). Palestine: Report and General Abstracts of the Census of 1922. Government of Palestine.
- Conder, C.R. (1881). "Meselieh". Quarterly Statement - Palestine Exploration Fund. 13: 194–195.
- Conder, C.R.; Kitchener, H.H. (1882). The Survey of Western Palestine: Memoirs of the Topography, Orography, Hydrography, and Archaeology. Vol. 2. London: Committee of the Palestine Exploration Fund.
- Conder, C.R.; Kitchener, H.H. (1883). The Survey of Western Palestine: Memoirs of the Topography, Orography, Hydrography, and Archaeology. Vol. 3. London: Committee of the Palestine Exploration Fund.
- Government of Jordan, Department of Statistics (1964). First Census of Population and Housing. Volume I: Final Tables; General Characteristics of the Population (PDF).
- Government of Palestine, Department of Statistics (1945). Village Statistics, April, 1945.
- Guérin, V. (1874). Description Géographique Historique et Archéologique de la Palestine (in French). Vol. 2: Samarie, pt. 1. Paris: L'Imprimerie Nationale.
- Hadawi, S. (1970). Village Statistics of 1945: A Classification of Land and Area ownership in Palestine. Palestine Liberation Organization Research Center.
- Mills, E., ed. (1932). Census of Palestine 1931. Population of Villages, Towns and Administrative Areas. Jerusalem: Government of Palestine.
- Palmer, E.H. (1881). The Survey of Western Palestine: Arabic and English Name Lists Collected During the Survey by Lieutenants Conder and Kitchener, R. E. Transliterated and Explained by E.H. Palmer. Committee of the Palestine Exploration Fund.
- Robinson, E.; Smith, E. (1841). Biblical Researches in Palestine, Mount Sinai and Arabia Petraea: A Journal of Travels in the year 1838. Vol. 3. Boston: Crocker & Brewster.
- Zertal, A. (2004). The Manasseh Hill Country Survey. Vol. 1. Boston: BRILL. ISBN 9004137564.
