= Rama, Jenin =

- Municipality type D (Village council)

Arabic transcription(s)
  - Arabic: الرامة
- Location of Rama, Jenin within Palestine
- Coordinates: 32°21′13″N 35°10′12″E
- Palestine grid: 166/195
- State: State of Palestine
- Governorate: Jenin

Government
  - Type: Village council

Population (2017)
  - Total: 1,222
- Name meaning: Er Râmeh, the height

Rama (Arabic: الرامة) is a Palestinian village in the West Bank located in the Jenin Governorate of the State of Palestine.

== History ==
Rama is an ancient village, situated on a hill in the plain. Ceramics from the Byzantine era have been found here.

=== Ottoman era ===
Rama, like all of Palestine, was incorporated into the Ottoman Empire in 1517, and in the 1596 tax registers, it was located in the nahiya of Jabal Shami in the liwa of Nablus. Raba was listed as an entirely Muslim village with a population of 17 families. The inhabitants paid a fixed tax rate of 33,3% on agricultural products, including wheat, barley, summer crops, olive trees, and goats and/or beehives, a press for olive oil or grape syrup, in addition to occasional revenues and a tax on people from the Nablus area, a total of 5,774 akçe.

In 1838 Rama was noted as a village in the Sha'rawiya al-Sharqiya district, north of Nablus.

In 1870 Victor Guérin found the village to have 120 inhabitants. He further noted ancient cisterns. In 1870/1871 (1288 AH), an Ottoman census listed the village in the nahiya (sub-district) of al-Sha'rawiyya al-Sharqiyya. In 1882 the PEF's Survey of Western Palestine (SWP) described Rama as follows: "A conspicuous village on a hilly knoll above the small plain, with a high central house. It is of moderate size, with olives below. The sides of the hill are steep."

=== British Mandate era ===
In the 1922 census of Palestine conducted by the British Mandate authorities, Rameh had a population of 149, all Muslim, increasing in the 1931 census to 186, still all Muslim, in 39 houses.

In the 1945 statistics the population of Er Rama was 280 Muslims while the total land area was 4,768 dunams, according to an official land and population survey. Of this, 244 dunams were allocated for plantations and irrigable land, 1,487 for cereals, while 6 dunams were classified as built-up areas.

=== Jordanian era ===
In the wake of the 1948 Arab–Israeli War and the 1949 Armistice Agreements, Rama came under Jordanian rule.

The Jordanian census of 1961 found 376 inhabitants.

=== post-1967 ===
Since the Six-Day War in 1967, Rama has been under Israeli occupation. Under the Oslo Accords, this town was assigned to Area A, with political control and security responsibilities assigned to the Palestinian National Authority.

== Bibliography ==
- Barron, J.B., ed. (1923). Palestine: Report and General Abstracts of the Census of 1922. Government of Palestine.
- Conder, C.R.; Kitchener, H.H. (1882). The Survey of Western Palestine: Memoirs of the Topography, Orography, Hydrography, and Archaeology. Vol. 2. London: Committee of the Palestine Exploration Fund.
- Dauphin, C. (1998). La Palestine byzantine, Peuplement et Populations. BAR International Series 726 (in French). Vol. III : Catalogue. Oxford: Archeopress. ISBN 0-860549-05-4.
- Government of Jordan, Department of Statistics (1964). First Census of Population and Housing. Volume I: Final Tables; General Characteristics of the Population (PDF).
- Government of Palestine, Department of Statistics (1945). Village Statistics, April, 1945.
- Guérin, V. (1875). Description Géographique Historique et Archéologique de la Palestine (in French). Vol. 2: Samarie, pt. 2. Paris: L'Imprimerie Nationale.
- Hadawi, S. (1970). Village Statistics of 1945: A Classification of Land and Area ownership in Palestine. Palestine Liberation Organization Research Center.
- Hütteroth, W.-D.; Abdulfattah, K. (1977). Historical Geography of Palestine, Transjordan and Southern Syria in the Late 16th Century. Erlanger Geographische Arbeiten, Sonderband 5. Erlangen, Germany: Vorstand der Fränkischen Geographischen Gesellschaft. ISBN 3-920405-41-2.
- Mills, E., ed. (1932). Census of Palestine 1931. Population of Villages, Towns and Administrative Areas. Jerusalem: Government of Palestine.
- Palmer, E.H. (1881). The Survey of Western Palestine: Arabic and English Name Lists Collected During the Survey by Lieutenants Conder and Kitchener, R. E. Transliterated and Explained by E.H. Palmer. Committee of the Palestine Exploration Fund.
- Robinson, E.; Smith, E. (1841). Biblical Researches in Palestine, Mount Sinai and Arabia Petraea: A Journal of Travels in the year 1838. Vol. 3. Boston: Crocker & Brewster.
