= Jarrar family =

Palestinian large family routed in Palestine since 16th century

Jarrar (Arabic: جرار) is a large Palestinian family routed in Palestine since 16th century in the Jenin area during Ottoman rule in Palestine. During this era, they were the most powerful of the rural families in Palestine's central highlands. Jarrar family participated actively in defending Akka (Acre) against Napoleon's invasion in 1799.

== History ==
The Jarrar family migrated to Marj Ibn Amer (Jezreel Valley) in the Lajjun district from the Balqa region in 1670. They became an economic power and gained control over what would become Sanjak Jenin in the early 19th century. The area was known for its grain, tobacco and cotton production. It also marked the border between Galilee and Jabal Nablus, linked the coast to the interior and contained the market town of Jenin. The Jarrars' political power was punctuated by their peasant militia and their heavily fortified, hilltop throne village of Sanur. Sanur was built by a branch of the Jarrar family, that moved there from nearby Jaba', which was another fortified village of the Jarrars.

In the 18th century, the Jarrar family was at the forefront of various conflicts between the governors of Acre and the rural clans and urban notables of Jabal Nablus. Acre was a rising power and as its successive governors attempted to expand their zone of influence, they entered into conflict with the Jarrar family because of the proximity of Marj Ibn Amer to Acre. The first serious battle occurred in 1735 with Sheikh Daher al-Umar over control over Nazareth, a principal center of trade in the interior between Jabal Nablus and the Levantine regions north of it. The town had for decades paid taxes to the Jarrar family, but Daher al-Umar attempted to covet it. His forces defeated the Jarrar family and the latter's leader, Sheikh Ibrahim Jarrar, was slain.

As the Nablus-based Tuqan family expanded its control over parts of the city's rural hinterland, primarily through their seizure of the Bani Sa'b subdistrict from the Jayyusi family in 1766, the Jarrars attempted to halt the process of urban control over the hinterland. To pressure the Tuqans, they allowed Daher al-Umar to pass through their territory without resistance and besiege Nablus in 1771 and 1773. The circumstances of these events placed the Tuqans and the Nimr family as the defenders of Ottoman sovereignty and the Jarrars as the backers of rebels, namely Daher al-Umar and the resurgent Mamluks of Egypt under Ali Bey Al-Kabir.

Following Daher al-Umar's death, Jezzar Pasha succeeded him as governor and unlike his predecessor, he developed close relations with the Ottoman government, eventually being entrusted with the governorship of Sidon Province and Damascus Province. He also cultivated close ties with the Tuqans. The Jarrars meanwhile resisted Jezzar's efforts to centralize control over Palestine. As a result, their fortress at Sanur was twice besieged by Jezzar's troops in 1790 and 1795, both ending unsuccessfully for Jezzar.

Between 1817 and 1823, a civil war occurred in the Jabal Nablus region, with the Jarrars and the Qasim family of the Jamma'in subdistrict leading the front against the Tuqan family, which had the support of the Ottoman government. The Tuqans hired outside mercenaries to aid them, stationing them in the village of Junayd, just west of Nablus. This move by the Tuqans fostered further resentment against them by the inhabitants of the area and helped the Jarrars in their war efforts. They defeated the Tuqans and the latter's leader Musa Bey Tuqan was killed by poison on 20 November 1823.

In 1830, the Jarrars refused to submit to Governor Abdullah Pasha of Acre's authority after he was apportioned the Jabal Nablus district. Consequently, Abdullah Pasha, with reinforcements from Emir Chehab of Mount Lebanon, besieged the Jarrars' throne village of Sanur, storming it four months later. The Jarrars' fortress was destroyed and their influence took a heavy blow. A year later, forces dispatched by rebel leader Muhammad Ali of Egypt conquered the Levant and ended Abdullah Pasha's reign. Ali's son Ibrahim Pasha was appointed governor of the Levant. He favored the Abd al-Hadi family based in Arraba as a counterweight to the Jarrars. They subsequently replaced the Jarrars as the leaders of the Sha'rawiyah subdistrict.

The influence of the Jarrar family was significantly reduced by the mid-19th century. In 1848, the Jarrar family split into two separate factions. One of these factions aligned with the family's former rivals, the Tuqans, to aid the Ottoman authorities in crushing the Abd al-Hadi family's power in Jabal Nablus. They participated in the assault on the Abd al-Hadi's throne village of Arraba, looting it and destroying the village's defenses and the Abd al-Hadi family's fortified houses.

Part of the family moved to the port city of Haifa in the 1870s. There they established trade relationships with foreign merchants and began an export company. Having been members of the elite in Jenin, their entry into Haifa's upper class was relatively easy. The main family member in Haifa was Tawfiq al-Jarrar, who was known as Salil al-Akabir (Son of the Great). In 1892, he served as the head of Haifa's trade and agriculture offices, being re-elected in 1900. At that time, he also was a member of Haifa's municipal council, the board of education and the transportation committee. Two years later, he was president of Agricultural Bank's Haifa branch.

== Modern descendants ==
- Hadem Rida Jarrar, Palestinian politician
- Khalida Jarrar, Palestinian activist and legislator
- Raed Jarrar, Palestinian-Iraqi architect
- Randa Jarrar, Palestinian-American novelist
- Samer Jarrar, Palestinian CPA
- Hakam Jarrar, Palestinian Structural Engineer
- Aziz Jarrar, Palestinian-Iranian-Iraqi student.

== See also ==
- Sanur Citadel

== Bibliography ==
- Doumani, B. (1995). Rediscovering Palestine: Merchants and Peasants in Jabal Nablus. University of California Press.
- Macalister, R.A.S.; Masterman, E.W.G. (1905). "Occasional Papers on the Modern inhabitants of Palestine, part I & part II". Quarterly Statement - Palestine Exploration Fund. 37: 343–356. doi:10.1179/peq.1905.37.4.343. S2CID 161632875.
- Philip, T. (2001). Acre: The Rise and Fall of a Palestinian City, 1730–1831. Columbia University Press. ISBN 9780231123273.
- Schölch, A. (1993). Palestine in Transformation, 1856-1882 (PDF). Institute for Palestine Studies. ISBN 0-88728-234-2.
- Yazbak, M. (1998). Haifa in the Late Ottoman Period, A Muslim Town in Transition, 1864–1914. Brill Academic Pub. ISBN 90-04-11051-8.
