= Beshara Doumani =

Palestinian-American academic

Beshara Doumani بشارة دوماني
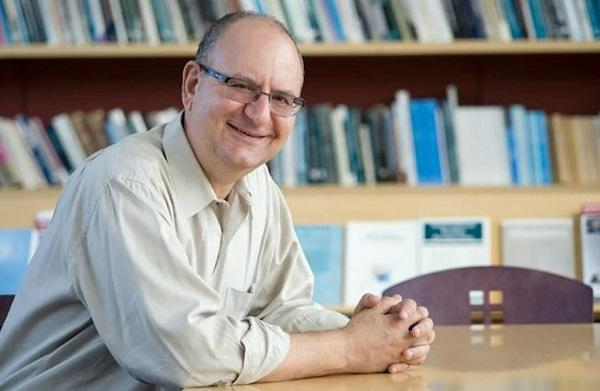
- Beshara Doumani, 2010
- Born: 1957; Saudi Arabia
- Occupation: Historian

Beshara Doumani (Arabic: بشارة دوماني) is a Palestinian-American academic who previously served as the president of Birzeit University from 2021 to 2023. He is the Mahmoud Darwish Professor of Palestinian Studies at Brown University. His research focuses on groups, places, and time periods marginalized by mainstream scholarship on the early modern and modern Middle East. He is also a public intellectual who writes on the topics of displacement, academic freedom, politics of knowledge production, and the Palestinian condition.

== Biography ==
Doumani is a Palestinian whose family was displaced from Haifa during the 1947–1949 Palestine war. He was born in Saudi Arabia but spent his youth in Lebanon until moving to the United States in 1970. He received his B.A. in History from Kenyon College in Ohio in 1977. In 1980, he earned an M.A. from Georgetown University, where he would later receive his Ph.D. in 1990.

=== Academic career ===
Before coming to Brown University Department of History in 2012, and helping establish the Brown Middle East Studies Program, he was a tenured faculty member at the University of California, Berkeley from 1998 to 2012, and a tenured professor at the University of Pennsylvania in Philadelphia from 1989 to 1998.

From 1996 to 1997 he was a fellow at the Woodrow Wilson International Center for Scholars in Washington, DC. From 2001 to 2002, he was a fellow at the Wissenschaftskolleg zu Berlin, and from 2007 to 2008 at Harvard University's Radcliffe Institute for Advanced Study in Cambridge, Massachusetts. He was a fellow at the Institute for Advanced Study in Princeton, New Jersey from 2018 to 2019.

From 2012 to 2018, Doumani was the founding director of Brown University's Center for Middle East Studies. From 2012 to 2020 he was the Joukowsky Family Distinguished Professor of Modern Middle East History at Brown. In July 2020, he became the inaugural Mahmoud Darwish Professor of Palestinian Studies, the first named chair of Palestinian Studies in an American university. The position is named for the Palestinian poet Mahmoud Darwish.

Doumani's specialty is the social, cultural, and legal history of the early modern and modern Middle East.

His books include Family Life in the Ottoman Mediterranean: A Social History (2017), Rediscovering Palestine: Merchants and Peasants in Jabal Nablus 1700-1900, Academic Freedom After September 11 (editor), and Family History in the Middle East: Household, Property and Gender (editor). Doumani has also published numerous articles on Palestinian history and historiography, including "Archiving Palestine and the Palestinians: The Patrimony of Ihsan Nimr", "Palestine Versus the Palestinians? The Iron Laws and Ironies of a People Denied", and "Rediscovering Ottoman Palestine: Writing Palestinians into History", among others.

Doumani is the founder of the New Directions in Palestinian Studies research initiative, and editor of its open-access book series, published by the University of California Press. He serves on the editorial committees of the Journal of Palestine Studies and the Jerusalem Quarterly. In 2017, he received the Sawyer Seminar award from the Andrew W. Mellon Foundation for his proposal, "Displacement and the Making of the Modern World: Histories, Ecologies, and Subjectivities," and organized the yearlong series of workshops, seminars, courses, and cultural activities for the Seminar.

From 2008 to 2010, Doumani led a team that produced a strategic plan for the establishment of a Palestinian museum in Birzeit.

== Bibliography ==
- Doumani, B. (1994). "The political economy of population counts in Ottoman Palestine: Nablus, ca 1850" (PDF). Int. J. Middle East Stud. 26: 1–17. doi:10.1017/S0020743800059730. S2CID 162272039. Archived from the original (PDF) on June 29, 2018.
- Rediscovering Palestine: Merchants and Peasants in Jabal Nablus, 1700-1900, University of California Press, 1995.
- Family History in the Middle East: Household, Property, and Gender (editor), SUNY Press, 2003.
- Academic Freedom After September 11 (editor), Zone Books/MIT Press, 2006. ISBN 1-890951-61-7
- Family Life in the Ottoman Mediterranean: A Social History, Cambridge University Press, 2017.
