= Claudine Dauphin =

French archaeologist and Byzantinist

Claudine Dauphin FSA
- Occupations: Historian; Academic

Academic background
- Education: University of Edinburgh
- Doctoral advisor: David Talbot Rice

Academic work
- Discipline: Archaeology
- Sub-discipline: Byzantine archaeology
- Institutions: Somerville College, Oxford; Sorbonne University; French National Centre for Scientific Research; University of Wales

Claudine Dauphin FSA (b. 1950) is a French archaeologist specialising in the Byzantine period. She is an Honorary Professor at the University of Wales, Lampeter.

== Career ==
Dauphin obtained a PhD summa cum laude from the University of Edinburgh in 1974 presenting the thesis Inhabited Scrolls from the IVth to the VIIth Century A.D. in Asia Minor and the Eastern Provinces of the Byzantine Empire. She was a Research Fellow in Byzantine Art and Architecture at Somerville College, Oxford, from 1979 to 1983. In 1994 she obtained her Doctorat d'État ès-Lettres (Mention Très honorable et félicitations du jury à l'unanimité) from the Sorbonne University. In 2005 she was appointed an Honorary Professor at the University of Wales, Lampeter. She was elected Fellow of the Society of Antiquaries of London on 2 February 2007. She was appointed an Honorary Professor in Archaeology and Theology at the University of Nice. In 2011 she left Nice to join the 'Orient et Mediteranée' group at the CNRS.

== Select publications ==
- Dauphin, C. 1998. La Palestine byzantine: peuplement et populations, Volume 1 (BAR International 726). Oxford, ArchaeoPress
- Dauphin, C. 1999. "Plenty of just enough? The diet of the rural and urban masses of Byzantine Palestine", Bulletin of the Anglo-Israel Archaeological Society 17, 39–65.
- Dauphin, C. 2005. "Sainte-Anne de Jérusalem: le projet Béthesda", Proche-Orient chrétien 55(3/4), 254–262.
- Dauphin, C. 2007. "Sex and ladders in the monastic desert of late Antique Egypt and Palestine", Bulletin of the Anglo-Israel Archaeological Society 25.
- Dauphin, C. 2009. Eucharistic bread or thistles?: fact or fiction?; the diet of the desert fathers in late antique Egypt and Palestine. Lampeter, Lampeter Trivium Publications (University of Wales).
