= Adam Zertal =

Israeli biblical archaeologist (1936–2015)

- אדם זרטל
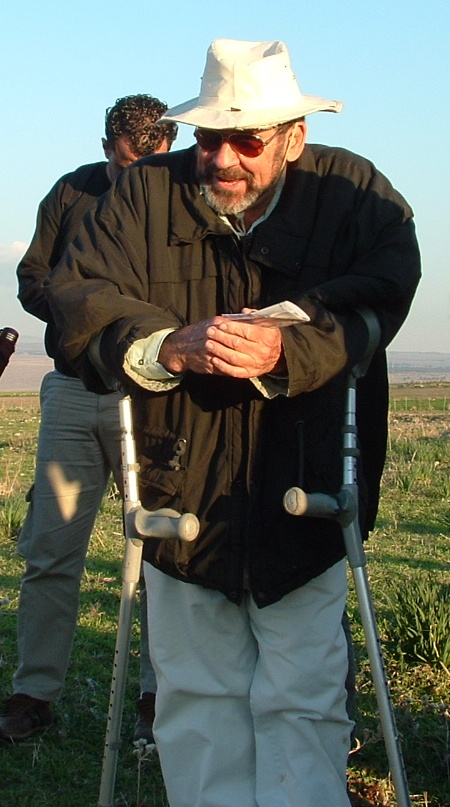
- Zertal in 2005
- Born: December 3, 1936; Hadera, Palestine, United Kingdom
- Died: October 18, 2015 (aged 78); Tel Aviv, Tel Aviv District, Israel
- Education: Tel Aviv University
- Scientific career
- Fields: Archaeology
- Workplaces: University of Haifa
- Thesis: The Israelite settlement in the Hill-Country of Manasseh (1986)
- Doctoral advisor: Nadav Na'aman, Moshe Kochavi

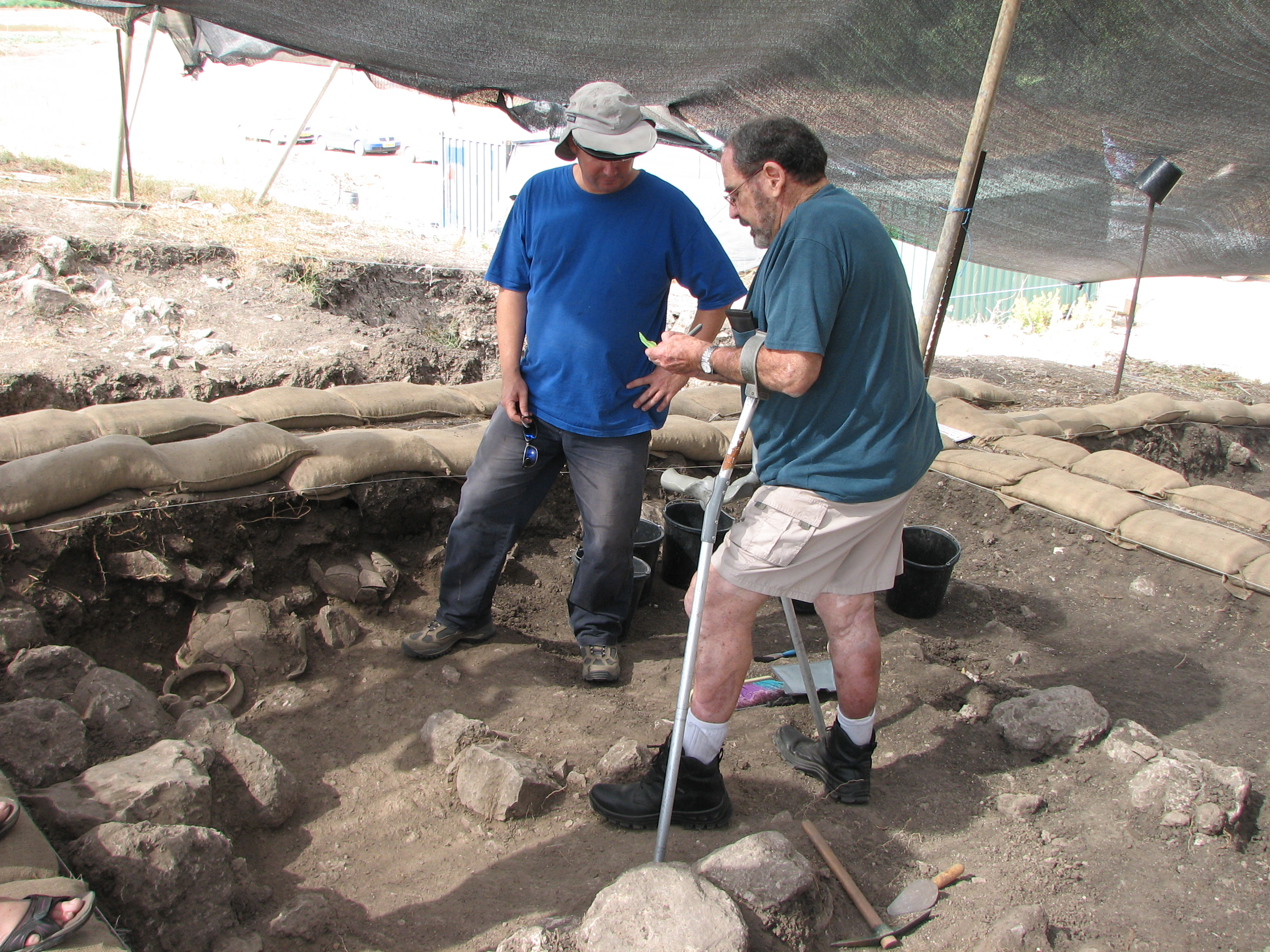
Zartal in Tel Esur

Adam Zertal (Hebrew: אדם זרטל; 3 December 1936 – October 18, 2015) was an Israeli archaeologist and a tenured professor at the University of Haifa.

== Biography ==
Adam Zertal grew up in Ein Shemer, a kibbutz affiliated with the Hashomer Hatzair movement. Zertal was severely wounded in the Yom Kippur War. He later told a reporter for The Jerusalem Post, "I spent a year at Hadassah Hospital in Jerusalem, and I became interested in archaeology. Although I had argued that the Bible was full of myths, I decided after my recovery to travel the land by foot to look for archeological evidence." He completed his doctoral dissertation, The Israelite settlement in the Hill-Country of Manasseh, under the supervision of Nadav Na'aman and Moshe Kochavi at Tel Aviv University in 1986.

== Archaeology career ==
Zertal claimed to have identified several sites he worked on as being connected to sites, events and characters from the narratives in the Hebrew Bible:

- Joshua's altar. A structure on Mount Ebal identified as an early Israelite altar.
- Sisera's town. Zertal headed the excavations at El-ahwat, which he has identified as the Biblical Harosheth Haggoyim, a fortress described in the Book of Judges as the fortress or cavalry base of Sisera, commander of the army of King Jabin. (Judges 4)
- Khirbet el-Hammam (Narbata). Zertal also excavated Khirbet el-Ḥamam, which he identified as the biblical town of Arubboth, administrative center of Solomon's Hepher district, and, in its later Second Temple period phases, as Narbata, a town mentioned by Josephus. He interpreted nearby circumvallation, camps and an assault ramp as Roman siege works dating to the outbreak of the First Jewish Revolt.
- Foot-shaped enclosures in the Jordan Valley and the hill country west of it. Zertal described them as ceremonial sites used during Iron Age I and probably later, as well. He explained the term "aliya la-regel" (lit.: "rise to the foot"), commonly translated as "pilgrimage", as derived from these enclosures, and saw the use of the expression in connection with the mandatory pilgrimage Temple in Jerusalem as an adaptation of the term to a new situation. Zertal discovered five such sites: Bedhat esh-Sha'ab (near Moshav Argaman), Masua (4) (near Masua), Yafit (3) (near Yafit), el-'Unuq, and the inner and outer enclosures at Mount Ebal.
- Underground quarry (possibly identified as biblical Galgala). In 2009, Zertal headed a team that discovered an ancient underground quarry in the Jordan Valley. He associated the cave with two Byzantine-period place names, Galgala and Dodekaliton (Greek for "Twelve Stones"), marked on the Madaba map next to each other and at a distance from Jericho that matches the cave's distance from the city. He offered the interpretation that the Byzantines had identified the site as Gilgal, where the Children of Israel had set up the twelve stones they had taken from the Jordan River while crossing it (Joshua 4:20).

Zertal's claims about Mount Ebal, where he worked for nine years, never gained traction within the wider archaeological community. While many archeologists agree that the structure was a site of an early Israelite cultic activity, its identification with Joshua's altar is disputed.

=== Selected publications ===
- Zertal, Adam (2004). The Manasseh Hill Country Survey. Vol. 1. Boston: BRILL. ISBN 9004137564.
- ——— (2007). The Manasseh Hill Country Survey. Vol. 2. Boston: BRILL. ISBN 978-9004163690.
- ——— (2011). El-Ahwat, A Fortified Site from the Early Iron Age Near Nahal 'Iron, Israel: Excavations 1993-2000. Boston: BRILL. ISBN 978-9004176454.
- ———; Mirkam, Nivi (2016). The Manasseh Hill Country Survey. Vol. 3. Boston: BRILL. ISBN 978-9004312302.
- ———; Bar, Shay (2017). The Manasseh Hill Country Survey. Vol. 4. Boston: BRILL. ISBN 978-9004346963.
- ———; Bar, Shay (2019). The Manasseh Hill Country Survey. Vol. 5. Boston: BRILL. ISBN 978-9004400863.
- ———; Bar, Shay (2021). The Manasseh Hill Country Survey. Vol. 6. Boston: BRILL. ISBN 978-9004463233.
- ———; Bar, Shay (2022). The Manasseh Hill Country Survey. Vol. 7. Boston: BRILL. ISBN 978-9004513044.

== Bibliography ==
- Hawkins, Ralph K.; Gass, Erasmus; Ben-Yosef, Dror, eds. (2021). His Inheritance: A Memorial Volume for Adam Zertal. Alter Orient und Altes Testament. Vol. 454. Ugarit-Verlag. ISBN 978-3-86835-336-5.
