= Naqib al-Ashraf revolt =

| Date | May 1703 – October 1705 |
| Location | Jerusalem, Jerusalem Sanjak, Damascus Eyalet, Ottoman Empire |
| Result | Revolt suppressed; Centralized Ottoman rule reasserted in Jerusalem; Capture and execution of revolt leadership |

Belligerents
| Ottoman Empire | Local ulama, Janissaries and inhabitants of Jerusalem and its vicinity |

Commanders and leaders
| Mehmed Pasha Kurd-Bayram; Arslan Mehmed Pasha | Muhammad ibn Mustafa al-Husayni al-Wafa'i (executed) |

Strength
| N/A | N/A |

Casualties and losses
| N/A | N/A |

The Naqib al-Ashraf revolt (also known as the Naqib al-Ashraf uprising) was a popular uprising in Jerusalem against the Ottoman authorities between May 1703 and October 1705. It was led by the city's naqib al-ashraf (local head of the order of Muhammad's descendants), Muhammad ibn Mustafa al-Husayni al-Wafa'i, and the rebels consisted of townspeople, peasants from nearby villages, local Bedouins, and religious notables (ulama). For over two years the rebels engaged in virtual self-rule in the city. However, divisions emerged within rebel ranks, and following an Ottoman siege, the rebel camp led by al-Husayni fled the city and were later captured and executed.

== Background ==
In the mid-17th century, the Sublime Porte (Ottoman imperial government) launched a centralization effort in the empire's provinces guided by the policies of the Köprülü Grand Viziers. In Palestine, these policies manifested in the gradual elimination of local hereditary dynasties, namely the Ridwans, Farrukhs and Turabays. These families traditionally provided the governors for the sanjaks (districts) of Jerusalem, Gaza, Lajjun and Nablus. They generally maintained close alliances with the notables of Palestine's major towns and with the Bedouin tribes.

Towards the end of the 17th century, the local governors had been replaced by Ottoman officials who discontinued the local relationships their predecessors had cultivated. Under the new governors, the exploitation of the local population by Janissaries, timariots (fief holders) and subashis continued unabated. The governors could not bring order to the Jerusalem Sanjak, with the main roads from Jerusalem to Jaffa and from Nablus to Hebron facing frequent assaults by Bedouin tribesmen and instability remaining rampant in the countryside and major towns such as Hebron. Many peasants left their villages to avoid heavy taxation by the governors or exploitation by junior officials. The dignitaries of Jerusalem often served as mediators of disputes in the district in place of government officials. The dignitaries' loss of privileges previously enjoyed under the local governors brought them closer with the lower, dispossessed classes due to their shared frustrations with the changing order. Moreover, acts by the Janissaries, namely the desecration of mosques and religious sites, including the Haram al-Sharif (Temple Mount) in Jerusalem, further incensed the population.

In 1701 Mehmed Pasha Kurd Bayram was appointed governor of the Jerusalem, Gaza and Nablus sanjaks. During his term, he launched repeated punitive expeditions against the peasantry and Bedouin tribesmen for rebelling against his authority, refusing to pay his increased taxes (Mehmed Pasha doubled the tax rate after entering into office) or, in the specific case of the Bedouin, for taking over local highways and imposing tolls on travelers. The campaigns were often brutal. In 1702, his campaign against the Bedouin and peasants in the Gaza and Jerusalem sanjaks resulted in 200 deaths among the Bedouin and peasants. In early 1703, he besieged the fortress town of Bayt Jibrin where rebels from the vicinity had barricaded themselves. Several villages were destroyed before Mehmed Pasha gained control of the town. Following the siege, the ulama of Jerusalem requested that Mehmed Pasha ease his stringent taxation policies and militarism, but their requests were ignored.

== Revolt ==
In May 1703, during Friday prayer at the al-Aqsa Mosque, and while Mehmed Pasha was leading a punitive expedition around Nablus, a rebellion against the government was announced. The mutasallim appointed by Mehmed Pasha and the small number of troops who had been left to govern the city were apprehended by the Jerusalemite rebels with key assistance from the local sipahi and Janissary units. The rebels also freed the inmates of the city's prison. Once word of the ulama's call for revolt spread, the urban Jerusalemites were joined by peasants from the villages in the countryside. The rebels prepared Jerusalem's defenses to counter an assault by Mehmed Pasha and his troops.

The rebels appointed Muhammad ibn Mustafa al-Wafa'i al-Husayni, the city's naqib al-ashraf (head of the order of the Muhammad's descendants), as their leader and the sheikh (chief) of Jerusalem, hence the modern name of the revolt. The sheikhs of the various city quarters were appointed to assist Muhammad ibn Mustafa to administer Jerusalem's governmental and economic affairs. With the rebels in firm control of the city, popular support from its inhabitants, and the establishment of a governing administration, the people of Jerusalem effectively began an over two-year-long period of self-rule in Jerusalem. The central government's preoccupation with more pressing matters in the capital during the Edirne revolt forced it to tolerate the state of affairs in Jerusalem.

Mehmed Pasha and Arslan Mehmed Pasha, the governor of the Damascus Eyalet (to whose jurisdiction Jerusalem belonged) and his successors, attempted to retake the city from the rebels during the siege that ensued. However, the rebels utilized Jerusalem's sacredness to Muslims to prevent serious bombardment of the city by Ottoman forces, while opening fire against the latter upon their approach.

In 1704, upon hearing that Sultan Ahmed III was dispatching a large army to take control of Jerusalem, a loyalist camp emerged that was content with Mehmed Pasha's dismissal and putting an end to the revolt. However, Muhammad ibn Mustafa did not trust imperial overtures and demanded stronger guarantees before ending the revolt. The population was split between the two camps, and the rivalry turned violent when Muhammad ibn Mustafa waged an armed campaign against the loyalists. The clashes peaked with a major battle in the narrow alleyways around the Bab al-Huta gate in the northern part of the city. The battle ended with dozens of fatalities and mass defections from Muhammad ibn Mustafa's camp. The loyalist camp was barricaded in the citadel with the qadi, awaiting the intervention of the imperial army.

Clashes between the rival camps began anew in late 1705, around the time that the imperial army was departing from Damascus. The imperial army met generally ineffective resistance in the hinterland of Nablus, where peasant irregulars harried them along the way to Jerusalem. Once the Ottomans reached Jerusalem's environs in October, Muhammad ibn Mustafa decided to escape from the city with dozens of his followers through the Damascus Gate and the Moroccan Gate on 28 October, during the evening. Muhammad ibn Mustafa was captured by the Ottoman authorities, sent to Istanbul, and was executed there in 1707.

== Aftermath and legacy ==
The flight of the naqib al-ashraf brought an end to the al-Wafa'iya al-Husayni family's influence in Jerusalem and paved the way for the al-Ghudayya clan, an ashraf family with a lower profile than the al-Wafi'a al-Husayni, to assume the post of naqib al-ashraf. A branch of the Ghudayyas became known as the al-Husayni family in the mid-18th century, and played a highly influentially role in Jerusalem's affairs during the remaining decades of Ottoman rule and whose members were leaders of the Palestinian national movement in the post-World War I period. Along with al-Wafa'iya al-Husayni, several other ulama and ashraf families lost the Ottomans' favor, although some later regained local administrative clout in later decades. Following the city's capitulation, thousands of Ottoman troops were garrisoned in Jerusalem under the command of a new governor. The large military presence led to a decline in Jerusalem's economy.

According to Ilan Pappe, the Naqib al-Ashraf Revolt was "unique in the history of the district of Jerusalem in that it allied peasants and Bedouins with dignitaries and notables. Historian Adel Manna called it the "First popular uprising in Palestine", while also noting that the revolt was geographically limited to Jerusalem and its immediate environs.

== Bibliography ==
- Manna, Adel (1994). "Eighteenth and Nineteenth-Century Rebellions in Palestine". Journal of Palestine Studies. 25 (1): 52–56. doi:10.1525/jps.1994.24.1.00p0048u.
- Manna, Adel (2000). "Ottoman Period, Late". In Mattar, Phillip (ed.). Encyclopedia of the Palestinians. Facts of File, Inc. ISBN 9780816069866.
- Manna, Adel (2009). "Rereading the 1834 Revolt against Muhammad 'Ali". In Mansur, Kamil; Fawaz, Leila Tarazi (eds.). Transformed Landscapes: Essays on Palestine and the Middle East in Honor of Walid Khalidi. 2009. ISBN 9789774162473.
- Ze'evi, Dror (1996). An Ottoman Century: The District of Jerusalem in the 1600s. State University of New York Press. ISBN 9781438424750.

== See also ==
- 1834 Peasants' revolt in Palestine
