= Naqib al-ashraf =

Governmental post in Muslim empires

Naqib al-Ashraf (Arabic: نقيب الأشراف) (plural: nuqaba or niqabat) was a governmental post in various Muslim empires denoting the head or supervisor of the descendants of the Islamic prophet Muhammad. The descendants of Muhammad were known as ashraf and throughout Islamic history, the ashraf organized themselves into large groups, akin to corporations, throughout the various Muslim territories. This was done to ensure their special place in Muslim society and thus maintain their socio-political privileges.

The office dated back at least to the Mamluk era and was maintained by the Ottoman Empire. During the Ottoman era, there was an imperial naqib al-ashraf who appointed subordinate provincial nuqaba al-ashraf. The appointments were renewed or changed on an annual basis. The official role of the imperial naqib al-ashraf was to keep updated lists of the ashraf and to distribute to the provincial nuqaba al-ashraf the goods and funds that they required to administer the affairs of the ashraf under their respective jurisdictions. Ashraf in the Ottoman Empire were accorded special privileges, including personal inviolability, certain tax exemptions and immunity from regular prosecution. In the event of a legal complaint against a member of the ashraf, the naqib al-ashraf would prosecute and judge the alleged offender.

The imperial naqib al-ashraf was typically a member of the ashraf based in the Ottoman capital of Istanbul. The naqib al-ashraf played a significant role in the sultanic court ceremonials in Istanbul.

== History ==
=== Aleppo ===
In Aleppo, the ashraf played a more significant role in that city's affairs than anywhere else in the Ottoman Empire, including Cairo and Damascus, where the nuqaba al-ashraf often were or grew wealthy. At one point during Ottoman rule, the ashraf in Aleppo constituted roughly 85% of the city's elite families, partially due to the large presence ashraf families traditionally had in the city, but also because of increasing intermarriage between ashraf and non-ashraf families. Because of their massive presence, there were typically a handful of ashraf families that formed the upper ranks of Aleppo's ashraf.

For much of the 17th century, the office of naqib al-ashraf was held by the Zuhrawi family, who were closely associated with the Shia Muslim community (Shia Muslim scholars identified them as Shia). The Taha family dominated the post for most of the 18th century, but at the end of the 18th century and the beginning of the 19th century, their control of the office was frequently interrupted by members of the al-Jabiri, al-Kawakibi, al-Trablusi, al-Qudsi, al-Adili and Shurayyif families.

=== Damascus ===
In Damascus, the office of naqib al-ashraf was the most socially prestigious post in the city among the various religious posts, including that of the Hanafi and Shafi'i muftis and the khatibs of major mosques, such as the Umayyad Mosque. However, this prestige did not necessarily translate into great political influence. Following the Tanzimat modernization reforms, the post of naqib al-ashraf lost considerable political influence, although a permanent seat for the Damascene naqib was reserved in the newly formed Administrative Council of Damascus Province, the highest political body in Damascus Vilayet.

Two local ashraf families, the al-Ajlani and Hamza, competed for the post in Damascus for much of the 18th and 19th centuries. Their service as nuqaba was occasionally interrupted by other ashraf families, namely the al-Kaylani and al-Hasibi. Shia or Shia-associated nuqaba in lesser cities in Damascus province included members of the Murtada family in Baalbek. The Murtada nuqaba were not explicitly followers of Shia Islam, although their suspected affiliation with Shia Islam was the likely reason that they were never given the post in Sunni Muslim-dominated Damascus.

=== Egypt ===
In Egypt, the Ottomans typically appointed a provincial naqib al-ashraf from Istanbul. This changed in the mid-18th century when Muhammad Abu Hadi, a member of Cairo-based al-Sadat al-Wafa'iyya ashraf family, was appointed to the post. Members of the al-Sadat family continued to consecutively serve as nuqaba al-ashraf in Egypt until being replaced in 1763 by another Cairene ashraf family, al-Bakri who were descended from Abu Bakr al-Siddiq, but yet had maternal links to the Ahl al-Bayt. The first member of the latter family to hold the post was Muhammad ibn Ahmad al-Bakri. Thereafter, the al-Sadat and al-Bakri families competed for the post, although the latter largely held it until the early 20th century.

Like other provincial nuqaba al-ashraf, the Egyptian naqib was required to pay a hefty sum to the authorities in Istanbul. The role of the naqib al-ashraf in Egypt, besides the traditional roles of the office, included participation in various ceremonies such as the procession of the kiswah before it left with the Hajj pilgrim caravan to Mecca, and ensuring the ashraf families' participation in the procession of the mahmal (decorated litter symbolizing authority of the sultan) to Mecca. The naqib al-ashraf often commenced building activity for religious institutions such as new mosques or Sufi lodges.

=== Iraq ===
The most important Sunni Muslim religious leader in Ottoman Iraq was the naqib al-ashraf of Baghdad. His influence was nominally limited to Baghdad, but often extended throughout Iraq. The principal ashraf family to provide the niqaba of Baghdad were the Gaylani (Keilani) family, descendants of Abd al-Qadir al-Gaylani, the founder of the Qadiriyya Sufi order which was popular throughout the Islamic world. In Karbala, the naqib al-ashraf was known as naqib al-ha'ir (Ha'ir being another name for Karbala). It was provided to the Shia descendants of Hasan and Husayn, and mostly alternated between Al Faiz and Al Zheek. In Basra, the naqib al-ashraf was often also the hereditary chief of the Rifa'iyya Sufi order. The influence of Basra's nuqaba al-ashraf fluctuated depending on the personal wealth of the individual naqib or the Ottoman authorities' use of him in the region's political affairs.

=== Jerusalem ===
In Jerusalem, the Husayni family served the post during early Ottoman rule. Their patrons were the Farrukh family whose members had often served as district governors of Jerusalem until the late 17th century. In 1703, a member of the al-Husayni family, Muhammad ibn Mustafa, led a two-year rebellion in Jerusalem, after which he fled and was later captured and executed. His death marked the demise of the al-Husayni family, and the beginning of the Ghudayya family's era. The first member of the latter to serve as Jerusalem's naqib al-ashraf was Abd al-Latif Ghudayya. At some point during the 18th century, the Ghudayyas adopted the name of their predecessors and were thenceforth known as the al-Husayni family. The new al-Husayni family dominated the post of naqib al-ashraf until the 20th century.

=== Nigeria ===
In Nigeria, the Madinawa clan are serving in the post, they are Islamic Leaders that claimed to be a clan of Sharifian descent and traced their lineage to the family of Muhammad through his grandson Hassan ibn Ali. They are related to the Alaouite dynasty of Morocco and are said to have migrated to the Sultanate of Kano in Nigeria due to conflicts and wars within the Moroccan monarchy after the death of Ismail ibn Sharif. The claim of being descendants of Muhammad enabled them to be regarded as a kind of nobility, with them becoming privileged in the chieftaincy system of the Kano Emirate. They were additionally believed to possess baraka, in Kano Emirate, they are referred to as Awliya Madinawa Malamai by some people, in reference to the city of Medina where they claimed to have originated from, situated in Western Saudi Arabia. Most of their ancestors were Islamic saints, the Muallimawa family Dynasty a branch of the Madinawa clan holds the position of Naqib al- ashraf.

=== Philippines ===
Since the arrival of the Sunni Sufi missionaries in the Philippines, there has been no documented institution of Naqib al-Ashraf in the country. Although Islam was introduced to the archipelago primarily through trade and the missionary activities of Sunni Sufi scholars rather than through centralized empires such as the Ottoman Empire, the Sulu Sultanate developed its own distinct Islamic leadership traditions. Dr. Calingalan Hussin Caluang, a Sunni Muslim adhering to the Ashʿari creed and the Shafiʿi school of jurisprudence, is described by published sources as the first known individual in the Philippines to hold the title of Naqib al-Ashraf. He is a descendant of Panglima Bandahala, whose lineage is shared with the Sultans of Sulu, who trace their ancestry to the seven Sunni Sufi missionaries, including Sultan Sharif ul-Hashim, a descendant of the Islamic prophet Muhammad. Historically, genealogical records in the Philippines were passed down through oral traditions and familial ties, given the absence of a formal Naqib al-Ashraf institution. Dr. Caluang’s position as Naqib al-Ashraf reflects both his ancestral heritage and the distinct Islamic governance of the region.

== Bibliography ==
- Çetinsaya, Gökhan (2006). The Ottoman Administration of Iraq, 1890–1908. Routledge. ISBN 9781134294954.
- Al-Damurdashi, Ahmad D. (1991). Abd al-Wahhāb Bakr Muḥammad (ed.). Al-Damurdashi's Chronicle of Egypt, 1688–1755. BRILL. ISBN 9789004094086.
- Khoury, Phillip S. (2003). Urban Notables and Arab Nationalism: The Politics of Damascus 1860–1920. Cambridge University Press. ISBN 9780521533232.
- Imber, Colin; Kiyotaki, Keiko (2005). Frontiers of Ottoman Studies, Vol. 1. I. B. Tauris. ISBN 9781850436317.
- Meriwether, Margaret L. (2010). The Kin Who Count: Family and Society in Ottoman Aleppo, 1770–1840. University of Texas Press. ISBN 9780292788145.
- Winter, Michael (2003). Egyptian Society Under Ottoman Rule, 1517–1798. Routledge. ISBN 9781134975143.
- Nasrallah, Abdul-Sahib (2018). Tarikh Karbala [History of Karbala] (in Arabic). Vol. 2. Beirut, Lebanon: Dar Ihya' al-Turath al-Arabi.
- Winter, Michael (2012). "Ashraf and naqib al-ashraf in Ottoman Egypt and Syria". In Morimoto, Kazuo (ed.). Sayyids and Sharifs in Muslim Societies: The Living Links to the Prophet. Routledge. ISBN 9781136337383.
