= Al-Jabiri =

Al-Jabiri (Arabic: الجابري) refers specifically here to the branch of the Jabri family based in Aleppo, Syria. This article is focused exclusively on the history, influence, and notable figures of the Jabri family in Aleppo, without reference to any branches or members outside this city.

The Jabiri Family (الجابري) was one of the most prominent, patriotic, and wealthy families in Syria from the 18th century well into the 20th century. Patrilineally, the family is descended from Ahmad bin Mousa Bin Abu Bakr Al Jabira Housaini. However, the family name "Jabiri" is derived matrilineally through Fatima, daughter of an Ottoman judge named Jabir Bin Ahmad Al-Halabi of Aleppo, who was wealthy and influential at the time of her birth.

== Rise to power in Aleppo ==
The Jabiri family rose to prominence in Aleppo during the 18th and 19th centuries, with their lineage tracing back to Ahmad Jabiri. After his father Mousa's early death, Ahmad was raised by his grandfather, Qadi Jabir, earning the nickname "Ibn Jabir" (son of Jabir), a name that passed down to future generations as "Jabiri."

By the mid-18th century, the Jabiris were established as influential Ulema. Ahmad Jabiri, the head of the family in 1760, resided in the 'Aynayn quarter of Aleppo, where he owned significant property inherited from his mother. In 1765, Ahmad created a waqf from his property, ensuring it would benefit his descendants. Before his death, three of his four sons had relocated to different parts of Aleppo:

- Taha: Moved to Farafira as a court clerk.

- As'ad: Remained in 'Aynayn.

- Yousuf: A teacher who spent time in Istanbul as a clerk in the imperial divan.

- Mustafa: Moved to Suwayqat 'Ali and rose to prominence as Mufti of Aleppo and Naqeeb Al-Ashraf, the highest religious positions in the city.

All current members of the Jabiri family descend from Mustafa, who made the name "Jabiri" official in court. His sons, Abdullah and Abdul Qader, became influential figures in Aleppo in the early 19th century, holding key religious and political roles such as Mufti, Ra'is al-Kuttab, and Naqeeb Al-Ashraf. Their joint efforts ensured their family's political success.

The family continued to produce prominent figures over the next century, including Ali Ghaleb bin Sa'eed Al Jabri, a representative of Aleppo in the Ottoman parliament, and poets such as Sedeeq bin Abdulhameed and Sa'd eldeen Al Jabri. Mohamad As'ad Pasha bin Ali Al Jabri served as a judge and politician, while Abdul Qader Lutfi bin Murad Al Jabri, known as "Haji Afandi," became wealthy through agriculture and later served as Mufti of Aleppo and a member of the city council.

The most prominent figure of the family was Sa'adAllah Al Jabiri, a national leader and key figure in Syria's independence in 1954, along with his brothers Ihsan and Nafe' Pasha. Their legacy remains visible in modern Aleppo, where many streets, squares, and schools are named after the Jabiri family, which played a pivotal role in the city's history for over 300 years.

== Other famous Members of the family ==
- Saadallah al-Jabiri, Syrian Statesman.

- Majd Eldeen Al Jabiri.

- Lamia' al-Jabiri, wife of Ba'thist Mustafa Tlas .

- Zaid Jabri, Syrian-Polish Composer.
