= Arslan Matarci Pasha =

Matarci Arslan Mehmed Pasha

Wali of Sidon
- In office 1703 – 1704 or 1706
- Preceded by: Matarci Kaplan Pasha
- Succeeded by: Matarci Beşir Pasha

Wali of Tripoli
- In office 1702–1703
- Monarch: Ahmed III
- In office 1694–1700
- Monarchs: Ahmed II; Mustafa II
- Preceded by: Sürmeli Ali Pasha

Wali of Damascus
- In office 1703–1704
- Monarch: Mustafa II
- Preceded by: Arnavud Osman Pasha
- Succeeded by: Firari Huseyin Pasha
- In office 1701–1701
- Preceded by: Silihdar Hasan Pasha
- Succeeded by: Mehmed Pasha Kurd Bayram

Personal details
- Born: Jableh
- Died: 1704 or 1706
- Relations: Matarci Kaplan Pasha (brother)

Military service
- Allegiance: Ottoman Empire
- Commands: Amir al-hajj (1691, 1702–1703)

Arslan Mehmed Mataraci Pasha, also Arslan Muhammad Pasha ibn al-Mataraji (died 1704), was the wali of Tripoli in 1694–1700 and 1702–1703, Damascus in 1701 and Sidon in 1703–1704.

== Biography ==
Arslan was the son or grandson of Matarci Ali, a janissary of obscure origins who governed Latakia and died there in 1666. The name Matarcı literally means "campaign gourd carrier". Arslan was born in Jableh, between Latakia and Tripoli, and was known to be highly knowledgeable in Islamic jurisprudence. He entered the service of Sürmeli Ali Pasha, a longtime wali of Tripoli who was keen on suppressing the province's rebellious Druze and Shia Muslim clans, namely the Ma'an and Hamada clans, respectively. Ali Pasha became Grand Vizier of the Ottoman Empire in 1694 and was instrumental in the appointment of Arslan as his successor in Tripoli. This was despite Arslan having no experience in administration. Ali Pasha further decreed that Arslan had authority over all the territory between Killis in the north and Gaza to the south. This was short-lived, however, as Ali Pasha was dismissed and executed in 1695.

Arslan Pasha continued Ali Pasha's campaign against the Shia and the Druze, both of whom he had a personal disdain of. The Matarcı-oğlu (Ibn al-Mataraji) family came to constitute one of Ottoman Syria's most powerful households. Arslan's brother Kaplan Pasha (also known as Qublan Pasha) was appointed wali of Sidon in 1700. In late 1701, Arslan Pasha was appointed wali of Damascus and amir al-hajj (commander of the Hajj caravan) after his predecessor Çerkes Hasan Pasha failed to protect the Hajj caravan of 1701, with thousands of pilgrims having been killed in a Bedouin attack. Arslan served as amir al-hajj in 1702, and was replaced as wali of Damascus in 1703 by Mehmed Pasha Kurd Bayram, but kept the post of amir al-hajj in 1703. After concluding the Hajj pilgrimage, Arslan Pasha was reappointed to Tripoli because no one else could "keep the Arabs under discipline" like him, according to Ottoman written records from the time.

Arslan Pasha was appointed as wali of Sidon in 1703, succeeding his brother. During his term, Emir Bashir I was confirmed the tax farmer of Mount Lebanon, and the latter appoint Umar al-Zaydani as the tax farmer of Safad. Emir Bashir was also appointed by Arslan Pasha as the tax farmer of the predominantly Shia-populated Jabal Amil. After the wali of Damascus, Arnavud Osman Agha, was dismissed in the middle of 1703, Arslan Pasha was appointed as his replacement as well as amir al-hajj. However, he died before the Hajj pilgrim caravan's departure in early 1704. According to historian Ahmad Hasan Joudah, Arslan Pasha was alive and continued to serve as wali of Sidon until 1706. The Matarci-oglu continued to be a prominent household, with one of its members, Beşir Pasha succeeding Arslan Pasha in Sidon in 1706–1712 and 1715–1717.

== Legacy ==
In the al-Aqsa Compound, north of the Dome of the Rock, there is a khalwa (chamber for spiritual retreat) named after him: the Khalwa of Arslan Pasha. He gave an endowment to restore it in 1697.

== Bibliography ==
- Barbir, Karl K. (1980). Ottoman Rule in Damascus, 1708–1758. Princeton University Press. ISBN 9781400853205.
- Harris, William (2012). Lebanon: A History, 600–2011. OUP USA. ISBN 9780195181111.
- Joudah, Ahmad Hasan (1987). Revolt in Palestine in the Eighteenth Century: The Era of Shaykh Zahir Al-ʻUmar. Kingston Press. ISBN 9780940670112.
- Winter, Stefan (2010). The Shiites of Lebanon under Ottoman Rule, 1516–1788. Cambridge University Press. ISBN 9781139486811.
