= Mehmed Pasha Kurd Bayram =

Ottoman statesman

Mehmed Kurd Bayram-zade Pasha

Wali of Damascus
- In office 1702–1703
- Monarch: Mustafa II
- Preceded by: Arslan Mehmed Pasha
- Succeeded by: Osman Pasha Arnavud
- In office 1705–1706
- Monarch: Ahmed III
- Preceded by: Firari Hüseyin Pasha
- Succeeded by: Baltaci Süleyman Pasha

Sanjak-bey of Jerusalem, Nablus and Gaza
- In office 1701–1703
- Monarch: Mustafa II

Military service
- Allegiance: Ottoman Empire
- Commands: Amir al-hajj (1704/05)

Mehmed Pasha Kurd Bayram-zade (transliterated in Arabic as Muhammad Pasha ibn al-Kurd Bayram), also known as Çerkes Mehmed Pasha (transliterated in Arabic as Muhammad Pasha al-Jarkasi) was an Ottoman statesman. He served as the district governor of Jerusalem, Gaza and Nablus in 1701–1703 and the provincial governor of Damascus in 1702–1703 and 1705–1706.

== Biography ==
Mehmed Pasha was appointed governor of the Jerusalem, Gaza and Nablus sanjaks (provincial districts) in 1701, and arrived in Jerusalem later that year. He was tasked with bring order and reasserting centralized authority in the region of southwestern Palestine. In Jerusalem, he doubled tax rates and used force to collect unpaid taxes, a significant departure from previous governors who had a more lax approach to tax collection.

During the first year of his term, Mehmed Pasha launched two punitive expeditions against the Bedouin tribes who had taken over the roads around Gaza and exacted tolls on the local inhabitants. Following the second expedition in November 1701, he returned to Jerusalem prisoners and spoils of war. In 1702, he launched a third punitive expedition, this time expanding the targets to include peasants in the rural hinterlands of Gaza and Jerusalem. About 200 peasants and Bedouin tribesmen were killed and Mehmed Pasha returned to Jerusalem with the severed heads of eleven rebels which were placed atop the city's gates to deter potential dissent. In 1702, Mehmed Pasha was appointed wali (provincial governor) of Damascus Eyalet, a post he served until early 1703.

However, dissent was not curbed and Mehmed Pasha's policies further incensed the population and increased defiance to his rule. Following the third military campaign, Bedouin and peasant rebels barricaded themselves in the fortifications of Bayt Jibrin, a large village between Gaza and Jerusalem. Mehmed Pasha and his forces besieged Bayt Jibrin, and the rebels held out for eight months until they were defeated sometime in early 1703. Many villages in the countryside around Bayt Jibrin were destroyed during the course of the siege. The ulama (Muslim scholars) and urban notables of Jerusalem appealed to Mehmed Pasha via the city's mufti (chief Islamic leader), Muhammad Effendi Jarallah, and the city's qadi (chief judge) to discontinue his military excesses against the districts' inhabitants, but to no avail. The qadi, locally reputed for his corruption, also extorted Jerusalem's residents.

In May 1703, during Friday prayer at the al-Aqsa Mosque and while Mehmed Pasha was leading a punitive expedition around Nablus, a rebellion against the government was announced. A mutasallim appointed by Mehmed Pasha and a small number of troops had been left to govern the city and were apprehended by the Jerusalemite rebels, who were assisted by local sipahi and janissary units. The rebels also freed the inmates of the city's prison. Once word of the ulama's call for revolt spread, the urban Jerusalemites were joined by peasants from the villages in the countryside. The rebels prepared Jerusalem's defenses to counter an assault by Mehmed Pasha and his troops.

Mehmed Pasha was dismissed from Jerusalem during the revolt. He was given the command of amir al-hajj for the 1704/05 Hajj, replacing Arslan Mehmed Pasha, who died suddenly before the caravan's departure. The post gave him responsibility of the provisioning and protection of the Muslim pilgrim caravan between Damascus to Mecca. Mehmed Pasha's abilities to marshal resources for the caravan was helped by the fact that he still served as governor of a number of sanjaks, from which he derived tax revenues. In 1705, he was appointed wali of Damascus, serving until 1706.

== Bibliography ==
- Joudah, Ahmad Hasan (1987). Revolt in Palestine in the Eighteenth Century: The Era of Shaykh Zahir Al-ʻUmar. Kingston Press. ISBN 9780940670112.
- Manna, Adel (1994). "Eighteenth and Nineteenth-Century Rebellions in Palestine". Journal of Palestine Studies. 25 (1): 52–56. doi:10.1525/jps.1994.24.1.00p0048u.
- Ze'evi, Dror (1996). Ab Ottoman Century: The District of Jerusalem in the 1600s. State University of New York Press. ISBN 9781438424750.
