= Jerusalem Sanjak =

Ottoman administrative district (1516–1872)

Sanjak of Jerusalem سنجاق قدس
- Sanjak of the Ottoman Empire
- 1516–1872
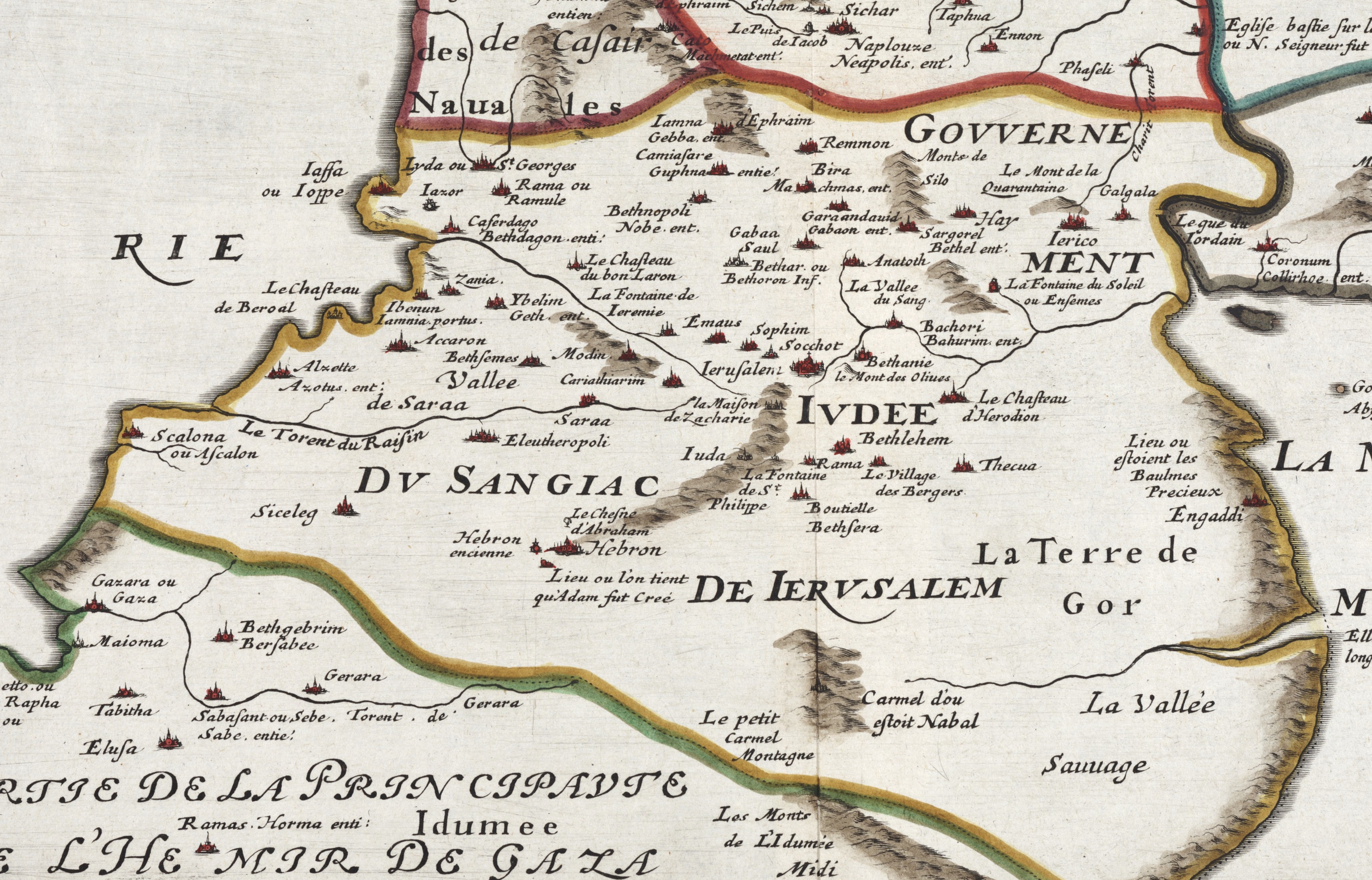
- 1657 map in French
- Capital: Jerusalem
- Area
  - Coordinates: 31°47′N 35°13′E
- Historical era: Ottoman Palestine
  - Ottoman–Mamluk War: 1516
  - The Walls of Jerusalem built: 1530s
  - Naqib al-Ashraf revolt: 1700s
  - Jerusalem earthquake: 1834
  - Siege of Jerusalem: 1834
  - Expansion of Jerusalem: 1850s
  - The Tanzimat reforms: 1872
- Contained within
  - Eyalet: Damascus
Succeeded by
Mutasarrifate of Jerusalem
- Today part of: Israel, Palestine

The Sanjak of Jerusalem (Ottoman Turkish: سنجاق قدس, romanized: Sancâk-ı Kudüs; Arabic: سنجق القدس, romanized: Sanjaq al-Quds) was an Ottoman sanjak that formed part of the Damascus Eyalet for much of its existence. It was created in the 16th century by the Ottoman Empire following the 1516–1517 Ottoman–Mamluk War. It was detached from the Syrian eyalet and placed directly under the Sublime Porte, the Ottoman central government, first for a brief period in 1841, and again in 1854.

During Ottoman period, the population around Jerusalem was organized into distinct village clusters (nahiyas) based on an apparent tribal basis, each with their own village-cluster sheikhs: Bani Murra, Bani Salim, Bani Hasan, Bani Zeid (see: Western and Eastern Bani Zeid municipalities), Bani Harith (see Kharbatha Bani Harith), Bani Malik (headed by Abu Ghosh) and more.

An independent province, the Mutasarrifate of Jerusalem, was created in 1872. It ceased to exist in 1917 during World War I as a result of British progress on the Middle Eastern front, when it became a British-administered occupied territory and later part of Mandatory Palestine as established by the League of Nations.

== Bibliography ==
- Abu-Manneh, Butrus (1999). "The Rise of the Sanjak of Jerusalem in the Late Nineteenth Century". In Ilan Pappé (ed.). The Israel/Palestine Question. Routledge. ISBN 978-0-415-16948-6.
- Macmunn, G. F.; Falls, C. (1930). Military Operations: Egypt and Palestine, From June 1917 to the End of the War Part II. History of the Great War based on Official Documents by Direction of the Committee of Imperial Defence. Vol. II. accompanying Map Case (1st ed.). London: HMSO. OCLC 656066774.
- Powles, Lieut.-Col. C. Guy; Wilkie, Alexander Herbert (1922). "Chapter VI: The Capture of Jerusalem". The New Zealanders in Sinai and Palestine. Official History New Zealand's Effort in the Great War. Vol. III. Auckland: Whitcombe & Tombs. OCLC 2959465.
- Shehadeh, Lamia Rustum (2011). "The name of Syria in ancient and modern usage". In Beshara, Adel (ed.). The origins of Syrian nationhood: histories, pioneers and identity. Routledge. pp. 17-29 [see 23]. ISBN 9780415615044.
