= Peasant's revolt in Palestine =

1834 rebellion against Egypt Eyalet

Peasant's Revolt of 1834
- Part of the Syrian Peasant Revolt (1834–35) (Campaigns of Muhammad Ali of Egypt)
Date	May–August 1834 (3 months)
Location	Palestine and Transjordan (then part of the Egyptian-ruled eyalets (provinces) of Damascus and Sidon; nominally, part of the Ottoman Empire)
Result	Revolt suppressed; Rebel leaders executed; Egyptian rule reasserted; Conscription orders carried out; 10,000 peasants deported to Egypt

Belligerents
Egypt Eyalet; Abd al-Hadi clan of Arraba; Abu Ghosh clan of Jerusalem region (From July 1834); Supported by: Shihab dynasty	Urban notables of Nablus, Jerusalem, Hebron and Safed Rural clans and Bedouin tribes of Palestine: Qasim, Jarrar, Barqawi, al-Hajj Muhammad and Jayyusi families of Jabal Nablus; Simhan family of Ras Karkar; Barghouti family of Bani Zeid; Abu Ghosh clan of Jerusalem region (Until July 1834); Madi family of Acre region; 'Amr tribe of Hebron Hills; Hawwara tribe of Galilee; Ta'amirah and Fawaghrah tribes of Bethlehem region; Awawna and Jabarat tribes of Gaza region; Supported by: Majali family of al-Karak

Commanders and leaders
Muhammad Ali; Ibrahim Pasha (WIA); Salim Pasha; Rashad Bey †; Mustafa Bey (WIA); Husayn Abd al-Hadi Jabr Abu Ghosh (From July 1834)	Qasim al-Ahmad (executed); Yusuf al-Qasim (executed); Isa al-Amr (executed); Abdullah al-Jarrar; Isa al-Barqawi (executed); Mas'ud al-Madi (executed); Isa al-Madi (executed); Ismail ibn Simhan (executed); Abd al-Jabir Barghouti (executed); Aqil Agha; Salim Atawna †; Subh Shawkah; Ismail Majali (executed) Ibrahim Abu Ghosh (Until July 1834)

Strength
~26,000 professional soldiers	Tens of thousands of irregulars

Casualties and losses
Several thousand	Thousands of rebels killed 10,000 peasants deported to Egypt
- Thousands of civilians killed Total (rebels and civilians): about 10,000 killed

The peasants' revolt in Palestine was a rebellion against Egyptian conscription and taxation policies in Palestine between May and August 1834. While rebel ranks consisted mostly of the local peasantry, urban notables and Bedouin tribes also formed an integral part of the revolt. This was a collective reaction to Egypt's gradual elimination of the unofficial rights and privileges previously enjoyed by the various classes of society in the Levant under Ottoman rule.

As part of Muhammad Ali's modernization policies, Ibrahim Pasha, the Egyptian governor of the Levant, issued conscription orders for a fifth of all Muslim males of fighting age. Encouraged by rural sheikh Qasim al-Ahmad, the urban notables of Nablus, Hebron and the Jerusalem-Jaffa area did not carry out Ibrahim Pasha's orders to conscript, disarm and tax the local peasantry. The religious notables of Safad followed suit. Qasim and other local leaders rallied their kinsmen and revolted against the authorities in May 1834, taking control of several towns. While the core of the fighting was in the central mountain regions of Palestine, the revolt also spread to the Galilee, Gaza and parts of Transjordan. Jerusalem was briefly captured by the rebels and plundered. Faced with the superior firepower and organization of Ibrahim Pasha's troops, the rebels were defeated in Jabal Nablus, Jerusalem and the coastal plain before their final defeat in Hebron, which was leveled. Afterward, Ibrahim Pasha's troops pursued and captured Qasim in al-Karak, which was also leveled.

By the 20th century, the revolt was largely absent in the Palestinian collective memory, from which "the humiliating and traumatic events" were "conveniently erased", according to Israeli historian Baruch Kimmerling. Kimmerling and Joel S. Migdal state that the revolt was a formative event for the Palestinian sense of nationhood in that it brought together disparate groups against a common enemy. Moreover, they asserted that these groups reemerged later to constitute the Palestinian people. The revolt represented a moment of political unity in Palestine. The goal of the rebels was to expel the Egyptian army and reinstate Ottoman rule to restore the Ottoman standards that defined the relationship between the government and the governed. These standards were made up of the religious laws, administrative codes and local norms and traditions that were disrupted by Egyptian reforms.

== Background ==
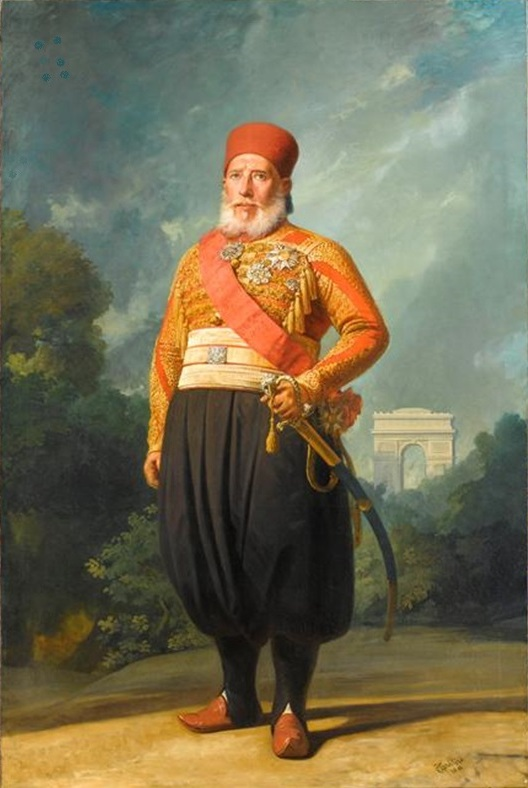
Ibrahim Pasha led the Egyptian army in the Levant

In consolidating his power, Muhammad Ali, the rebel governor of Ottoman Egypt, was modeling his rule on the bureaucratic organization characteristic of modern European states. Like earlier rulers of Egypt, Muhammad Ali sought to extend his control over greater Syria (the Levant) for its strategic value and natural resources. Syria also had a prospering international trading community with well-developed markets. In Muhammad Ali's strategy, Syria would serve as a captive market for goods being produced in Egypt. Moreover, Syria could serve as a buffer state between Egypt and the Ottoman sultan in Constantinople. Muhammad Ali was attempting to become independent of the Ottoman Empire.

A new fleet and army was raised under Muhammad Ali, and on 31 October 1831, his son Ibrahim Pasha invaded Syria, initiating the First Egyptian–Ottoman War. The pretext for the expedition was Muhammad Ali's quarrel with Abdullah Pasha, the governor of Acre. Muhammad Ali alleged that 6,000 fellahin (peasants or farm laborers) had fled to Acre to escape the Egyptian draft, corvée, and taxes, and he demanded their return. Ibrahim Pasha advanced through Palestine, occupied Haifa in December 1831, and made the city his primary military base.

Egyptian economic and political policies alienated four broad and influential factions in Palestine, namely the effendiyat (notables) of Jerusalem, the bulk of the major clans in Jabal Nablus, the clans of the Jerusalem hinterland, and the Bedouin tribes in the areas of Hebron and Bethlehem.

In late 1832, Qasim al-Ahmad, leader of the Qasim clan and the chief of the nahiya (subdistrict) of Jamma'in in Jabal Nablus was dismissed by Ibrahim Pasha from his additional post of mutassalim (administrator) of Jerusalem after having served a few months in that office. The official reasoning for Qasim's dismissal was his "advanced age". He was replaced by his son Muhammad al-Qasim, who was consequently removed from the more powerful post of mutassalim of Nablus. Afterward, Sulayman Abd al-Hadi of the Arraba-based Abd al-Hadi clan, a prominent ally of the Egyptians, was appointed to Muhammad's former post in Nablus. The move was a power-play by Ibrahim Pasha and the Abd al-Hadis, who were quickly gaining prominence in the region; their members had been appointed to head the Sidon Eyalet (which included part of northern Palestine) and a number of its districts. The move provoked the Qasim clan's anger with the Abd al-Hadi family and the Egyptian authorities.

The Abu Ghosh clan, based in the Jerusalem-area village of Qaryat al-Inab, traditionally served as toll collectors for the Jerusalem-Jaffa road, and were increasingly considered by Ibrahim Pasha to be extortionists. They were targeted by the authorities in 1833. The clan's leadership was arrested, including their head sheikh Ibrahim Abu Ghosh, and were temporarily sentenced to forced labor in Acre. Relations between the authorities and the Bedouin tribes of south-central Palestine were also antagonistic. Traditionally, during Ottoman rule, the Bedouin were allowed to collect tribute payments from travelers and the inhabitants of the area in return for services to the state. Ibrahim Pasha saw the Bedouin as raiders who exceeded their privileges and abolished this practice. He also imposed additional conditions on the Bedouin, primarily the requirement of transporting grain for Egyptian troops in return for the right to graze livestock. In 1833, the Dura-based Amr tribe of the Hebron Hills, which was headed by Isa Amr and Abd al-Rahman Amr, was targeted in a military campaign by Ibrahim Pasha. The Abu Ghosh, the Ras Karkar-based Simhan clan, and the Amr tribe were essentially at war with the Egyptians.

The imposition of new taxation categories that were a departure from both secular Ottoman law and the traditionally accepted Islamic law drew local Muslim anger at the authorities. However, the principal point of contention between the authorities and the notables of Jerusalem and Nablus was the conscription order by Ibrahim Pasha on 25 April 1834. That day, Ibrahim Pasha convened with all of the clan leaders from both cities to demand the drafting of one out of every five Muslim men of fighting age. The order would begin with the conscription of 200 men from the town of Jerusalem, a combined 3,500 men from Jerusalem Sanjak and Nablus Sanjak, and 500 men from town of Hebron. According to a chronicled account, during the meeting, Ibrahim Pasha attempted to address the reluctance of the notables in sending their kinsmen and peasants to the army, asking that as Muslims at war with Christian nations, "is it not necessary for us to have a big standing army?" The notables replied in the affirmative, but asserted that their men were already trained in the art of war and like the generations before them, they would "willingly shed blood" for the "fatherland" and "defend their country" from "the enemies of our religion". Ibrahim Pasha countered that their fighters would need to be professionally trained, telling them "War is not the place for a herd of useless men". By May 1834, the only prominent ally of the Egyptians in Palestine was the Abd al-Hadi clan.

== Revolt ==
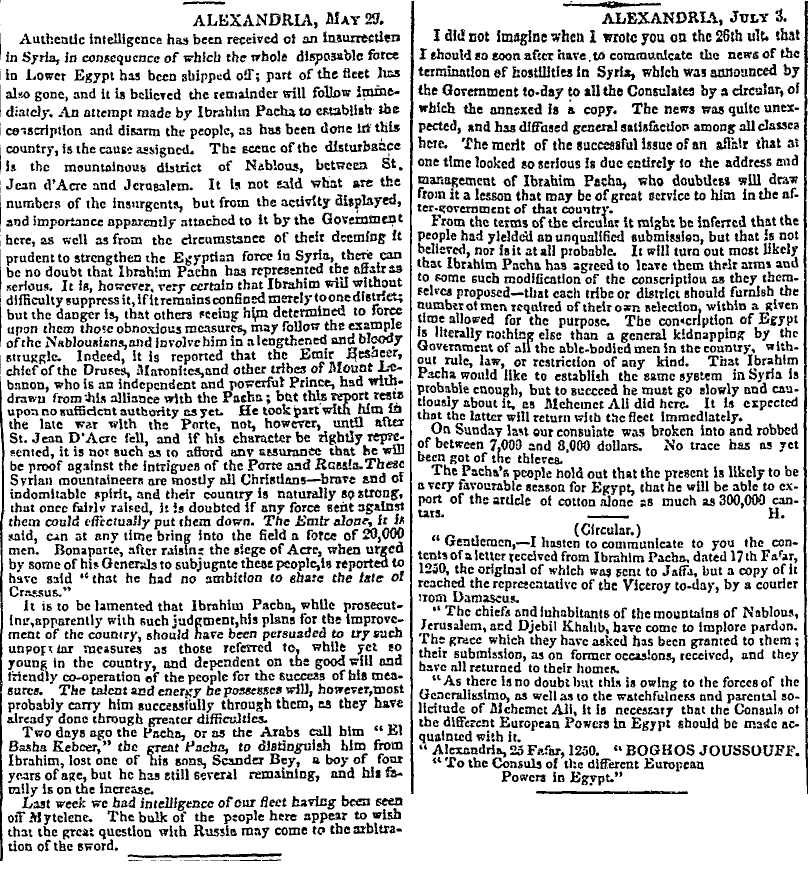
The Times Correspondent description of the 1834 Revolt in Palestine, May 29, 1834, and Jul 3 1834

=== Beginning of revolt ===
In retaliation for his dismissal and his son's practical demotion, Qasim al-Ahmad organized the a'yan (notables) of Nablus, Hebron and Jerusalem against Ibrahim Pasha. On 19 May 1834, the notables notified Egyptian officials that they were not able to conscript the peasants or collect taxes from them, claiming that the peasantry had taken up arms and fled to the mountains, which were difficult to access. At the time of the notables' stated failure to conscript local peasants, Ibrahim Pasha had been in need of new troops to replenish his army in preparation for further advances against the Ottomans. He considered the notables' position to be treasonous and tantamount to an insurrection.

Following the declaration of the notables, a meeting of local sheikhs (chiefs) from Jabal Nablus was hosted by Qasim in his clan's throne village of Beit Wazan and was attended by Qasim's sons Yusuf and Muhammad, Abdullah al-Jarrar of Sanur, Isa al-Barqawi of Shufa and Nasser al-Mansur al-Hajj Muhammad of Beit Furik. The leaders expressed their frustrations at the close cooperation between the Abd al-Hadi family and the Egyptian government and the meeting concluded with an agreement to oust the Egyptian army from Palestine. Under Qasim's leadership the peasants of Jabal Nablus openly revolted against the authorities. At around the same time, the notables of Safad, the only sanjak (district) in Palestine that was part of the Sidon Eyalet, declared their opposition to Ibrahim Pasha's orders and sent a letter to Qasim affirming their refusal to comply with conscription orders, stating that "the son is the core of the heart, and naturally no one can leave his son without the sacrifice of life itself".

The uprising spread to Jerusalem, Hebron and other mountainous areas in the area roughly corresponding with the present-day West Bank. Although Nablus was the core of the rebels' strength, the first actual clash between the authorities and the rebels occurred in the vicinity of Hebron after a group of Egyptian soldiers were sent by the Egyptian governor of Hebron to enforce the draft orders. Local peasants from the nearby village of Sa'ir and Bedouin fighters from the Bethlehem-based Ta'amirah tribe joined forces and killed some 25 soldiers during the fighting, defeating Ibrahim Pasha's forces in the area. Before this clash, peasants and local Bedouin took up arms against the Egyptian army in al-Salt, the Transjordanian center of the Nablus-based Tuqan family. Following these confrontations, the Egyptian army's Nineteenth Regiment under Mustafa Bey came under rebel assault in the Jezreel Valley en route to the Galilee. About three-quarters of the regiment's roughly 1,200 soldiers were killed or captured, and Mustafa Bey was wounded. With 300 of his soldiers, Mustafa Bey escaped to Haifa and traveled across Haifa Bay to Acre, whose walls were surrounded by rebel forces.

=== Rebel capture of Jerusalem ===
While there are no known records of military planning, in early May the notables of Nablus, Jerusalem and Hebron coordinated an assault against Jerusalem. On 8 May armed peasants from Nablus, Jerusalem, Hebron and Gaza besieged the city and about 10,000 fighters attempted to breach the walls. They were initially repulsed by the Egyptian garrison. An earthquake occurred in the city on 13 May and fighting ceased for several days.

On 19 May, some residents of Jerusalem's Silwan neighborhood informed rebel leaders that they could use a sewer tunnel that ran from the Dung Gate to a mill in the Jewish Quarter, to clandestinely enter Jerusalem. The next day, 36 rebels (peasants and Jerusalemites) under the leadership of Sheikh Subh Shawkah, chief of the Bethlehem-area Fawaghirah tribe, entered the city via the tunnel and then opened the Dung Gate to allow thousands of rebels inside the walled city. The Egyptian commander of the city, Rashad Bey, subsequently withdrew his garrison into Jerusalem's citadel to take up positions against the incoming rebels.

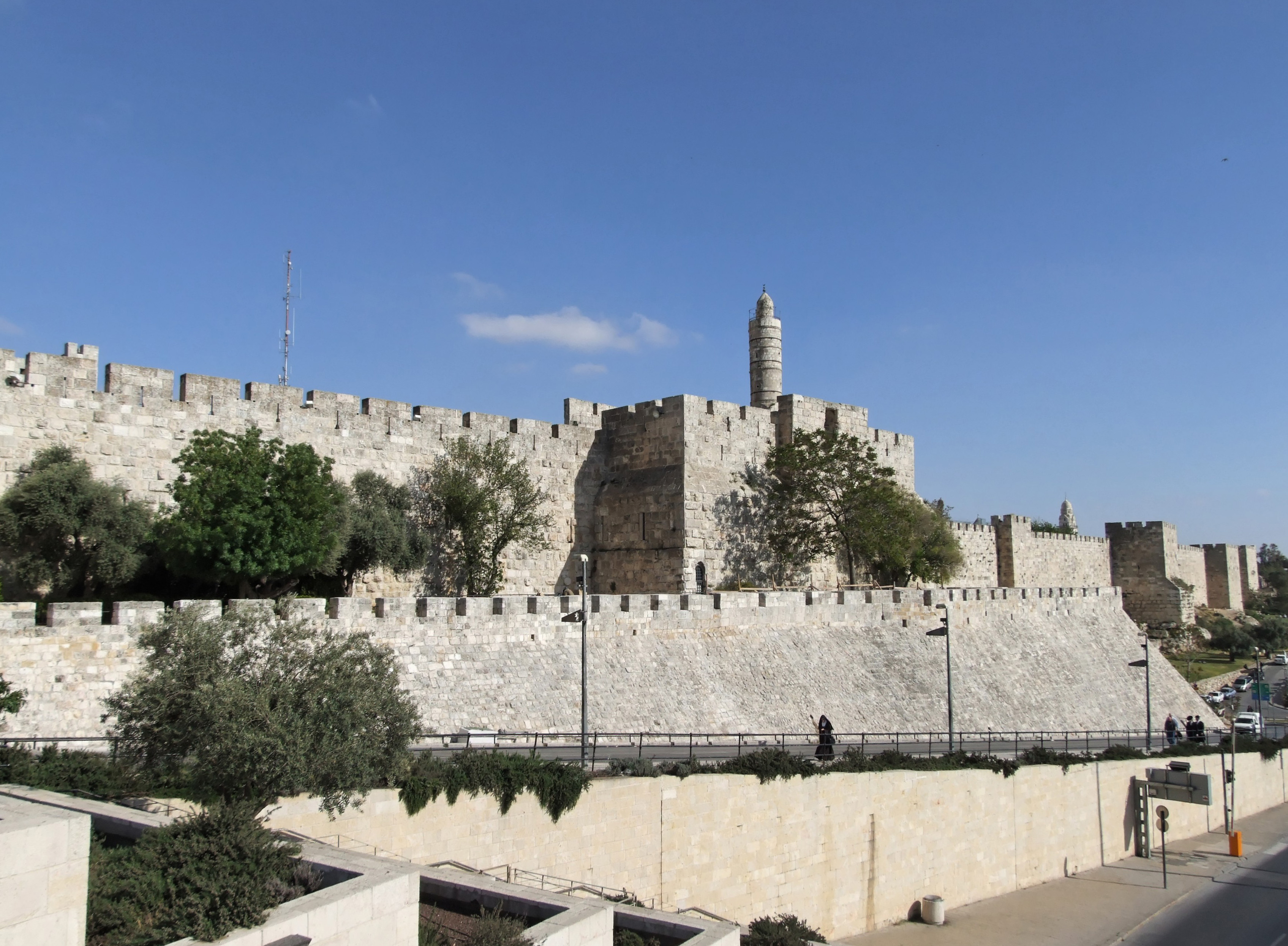
The citadel in Jerusalem was besieged and eventually breached by rebel forces

The rebels, who were joined by some of the city's poorer Muslim residents, began to loot the homes of Egyptian officers. In response, some 500 Egyptian troops left the citadel to pursue the rebels, but began to loot homes in the city in revenge before Rashad Bey ordered them to cease. Fifty rebels, sixteen residents and five soldiers were killed in the confrontations of 20 May. The following day, the rebels attacked the city and after a brief counterattack, Rashad Bey and his men returned to the citadel. Afterward, residents sympathetic to the revolt opened the Damascus Gate and 2,000 peasant irregulars from Nablus entered to reinforce the rebels, whose numbers in Jerusalem then reached some 20,000. On that same day, but before the rebels' entry, Rashad Bey's troops had arrested Jerusalem's leading notables, including the mufti (leading Islamic scholar) Tahir Effendi al-Husayni, the leading ashraf (locally honored descendants of the Islamic prophet Muhammad) Umar Effendi al-Husayni, and Muhammad al-Khalidi, and others. When the reinforcements from Nablus arrived, Egyptian troops withdrew further into the citadel, and Jerusalem was all but captured.

The rebels besieged and fired at the citadel and a wave of mass looting followed for the next three days. Virtually every Muslim, Jewish and Christian-owned shop was raided and damaged. Because the Muslim shops were the last to be plundered, their owners were able to salvage most of their valuable merchandise. A Greek monk named Spyridon who resided in the city wrote that once the homes of Egyptian officers were looted, the rebels "began to loot the shops of the Jews, the Christians, the Franks, and then the Muslims. The grocers, the shoemakers and every other dealer suffered alike. Within two or three days there was not one shop intact in the market". Protests by some citizens against the looting went unheeded as they were outnumbered by rebels. After the market areas were plundered, rebels began to loot the homes of Christians, which had been abandoned during the chaos, despite prohibitions by rebel leaders and local sheikhs. The rebel leadership warned that such actions would provoke the protestations of Ottoman Sultan Mahmud II, who was at war with Muhammad Ali. On 23 May, all state-owned supply warehouses and granaries were looted.

=== Battles in Jerusalem and its environs ===
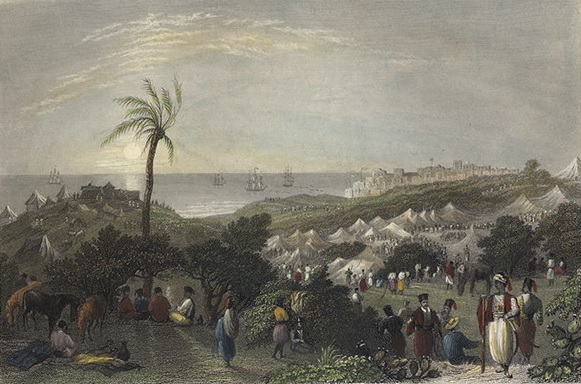
Encampment of Ibrahim Pasha, near Jaffa. Print by W. H. Bartlett, from 1838

On 24 May Ibrahim Pasha departed from Jaffa with 9,000 soldiers and began his march toward recapturing Jerusalem. The next day, thousands of rebels left the city to harry Ibrahim Pasha's forces on their route. A trip that would have normally taken five hours lasted two days as rebels attacked Egyptian troops, inflicting some 1,500 casualties, including at least 500 fatalities. When Ibrahim Pasha reached Jerusalem, he did not enter the city immediately and instead stationed his forces at his headquarters in Mount Zion, which overlooked Jerusalem. On 28 May, he offered an amnesty to any rebel who surrendered, but none did. With 3,000 soldiers he personally commanded a pursuit of rebels inside the city, resulting in the deaths of about 300 rebels and the capture of some 500. Most were promptly released, but seventeen were jailed.

On 30 May Ibrahim Pasha re-entered Jerusalem and the next day Egyptian troops attacked Beit Jala, a nearby Christian village. A reported 33 men and women were killed there because of their alleged involvement in the looting of Egyptian property. The purported revenge killings were halted by Ibrahim Pasha, but the residents' livestock was seized. The next day, over 1,000 rebels from the Ta'amirah tribe entered the adjacent town of Bethlehem to protect their families and the Christian inhabitants from potentially experiencing the same fate as Beit Jala. They refrained from directly confronting Ibrahim Pasha, however. Bethlehem's Muslim Quarter was destroyed by the Egyptian army and its inhabitants disarmed. This move was apparently a punishment for the killing of a favored loyalist of Ibrahim Pasha. Reverend William McClure Thomson wrote "this terrible vengeance failed to quell the turbulent spirit of the people. They are ever distinguished in the great feasts at Jerusalem by their fierce and lawless manners, and if any row occurs they are sure to have a hand in it." The peasant rebels had frequently requested from the Christians of Bethlehem that they fight alongside them against Ibrahim Pasha's troops. The Christians refused, citing their religious beliefs and political status, and sheltered in the town's monasteries for safety. On 3 June, the rebels decided to attack the monasteries and looted the city. On 4 June rebels launched an attack on Ibrahim Pasha and about 4,000 of his men at Solomon's Pools near al-Khader.

In Jerusalem meanwhile, Rashad Bey and his garrison (numbering 1,500 men) were assaulted by rebel forces. Rashad Bey and 800 Egyptian soldiers were killed, while hundreds more were captured by rebels and taken to Hebron. Ibrahim Pasha had since returned to Mount Zion and the rebels attempted to lay siege against him and his troops.

=== Spread of rebellion and truce negotiations ===
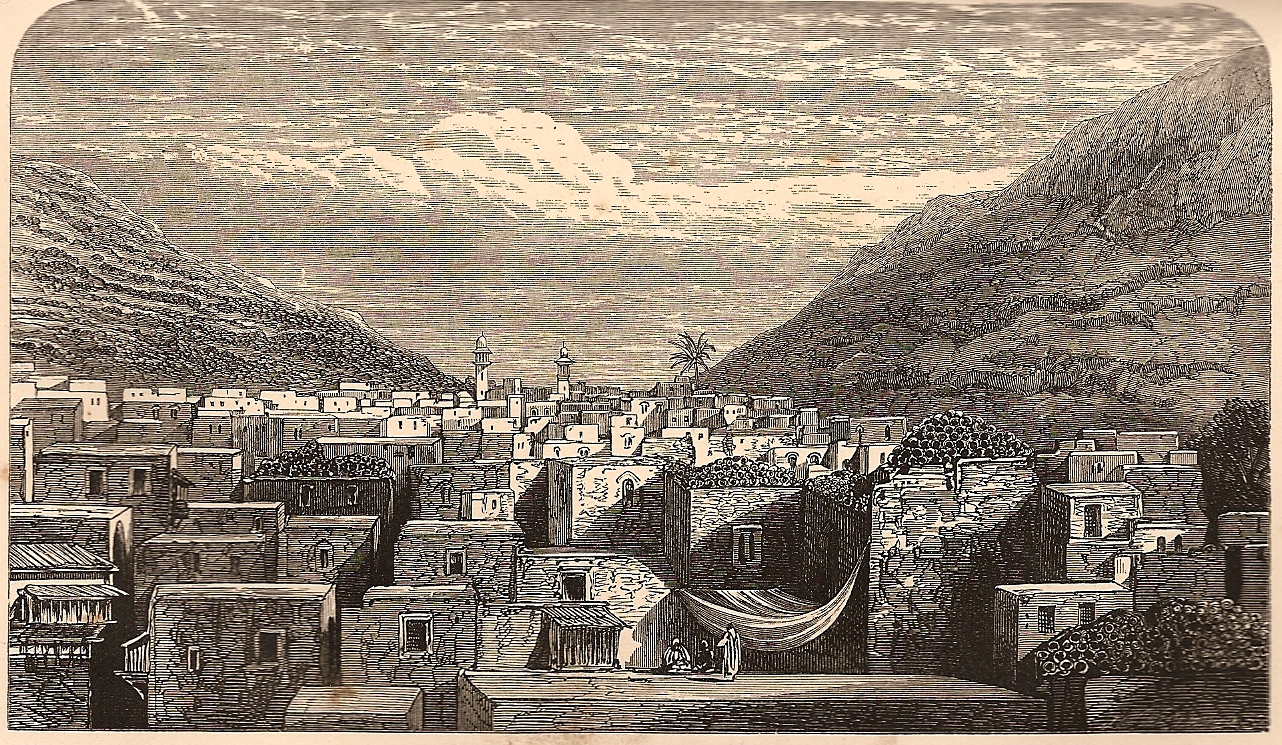
Nablus, by W. C. P. Medlycott, in H. B. Tristram, 1865.

By 8 June, Nablus was in full-scale rebellion as were the coastal towns of Ramla, Lydda, Jaffa and Acre. At around the same time, rebels from the area of Atlit besieged Haifa and Galilee-based rebels captured Safad and Tiberias in the eastern Galilee, while Bedouins participating in the revolt attacked the Egyptian garrison at al-Karak in Transjordan. In the latter confrontation, 200 Egyptian soldiers were killed. In the rebel attack on Safad on 15 June, an unknown number of the city's Jewish inhabitants were killed or raped over a period of 33 days.

When the notables of Jerusalem learned that Muhammad Ali was set to arrive in Palestine with reinforcements, they offered to mediate a truce between the Egyptians and the rebel leaders through the mufti Tahir Effendi al-Husayni, who had since been released. The leader of the rebels in the Hebron Hills, Isa al-Amr, informed al-Husayni of three conditions for a truce to be reached: the pardoning of all rebels, the cancellation of conscription orders in return for the payment of 1,000 qirsh per male, and the abolition of the new taxation category. The terms were rejected by Ibrahim Pasha, but he continued negotiations with al-Husayni through Husayn Abd al-Hadi, the governor of Sidon.

Qasim al-Ahmad, head of the rebels in Jabal Nablus, then requested a pardon from Ibrahim Pasha so that he could negotiate an end to the fighting himself. Ibrahim agreed and with guarantees of safety by al-Husayni and Abd al-Hadi, Qasim met with Ibrahim in late June. The latter admonished Qasim for his betrayal of Muhammad Ali, to which Qasim responded with an apology and an explanation that his hand was forced. By the end of the meeting, the two reconciled and Ibrahim reappointed Qasim as mutassalim of both Nablus and Jerusalem.

However, some time after Ibrahim's summit with Qasim, Muhammad Ali had several prominent Jerusalemite notables, including Tahir Effendi al-Husayni, Umar Effendi al-Husayni, Muhammad Ali al-Husayni, Muhammad Ali al-Khalidi, Sheikh Abdullah Budayri and Muhammad Abul Saud arrested and sentenced to exile in Egypt where they would be incarcerated. Many of the local village headmen in the Jaffa region were executed by Ali for supporting the revolt. Jaffa's urban notables, who also backed the rebels in their earlier attempt to capture Jaffa's fortress, escaped a similar fate by fleeing to the island of Cyprus. A number of major notables from other parts of Palestine were rounded up as well, including the religious leaders Sheikh Abdullah al-Fahum of Nazareth and Sheikh Said al-Sa'di of az-Zeeb. Both were exiled to Egypt. Mas'ud al-Madi, the mutassalim of Jaffa, and his son Isa al-Madi, the mutassalim of Safad, were arrested and executed by beheading for joining the revolt. The Madi family was the most powerful feudal household in the northern coastal region of Palestine at the time of their leaders' executions.

=== Defeat of the rebels in Jabal Nablus ===
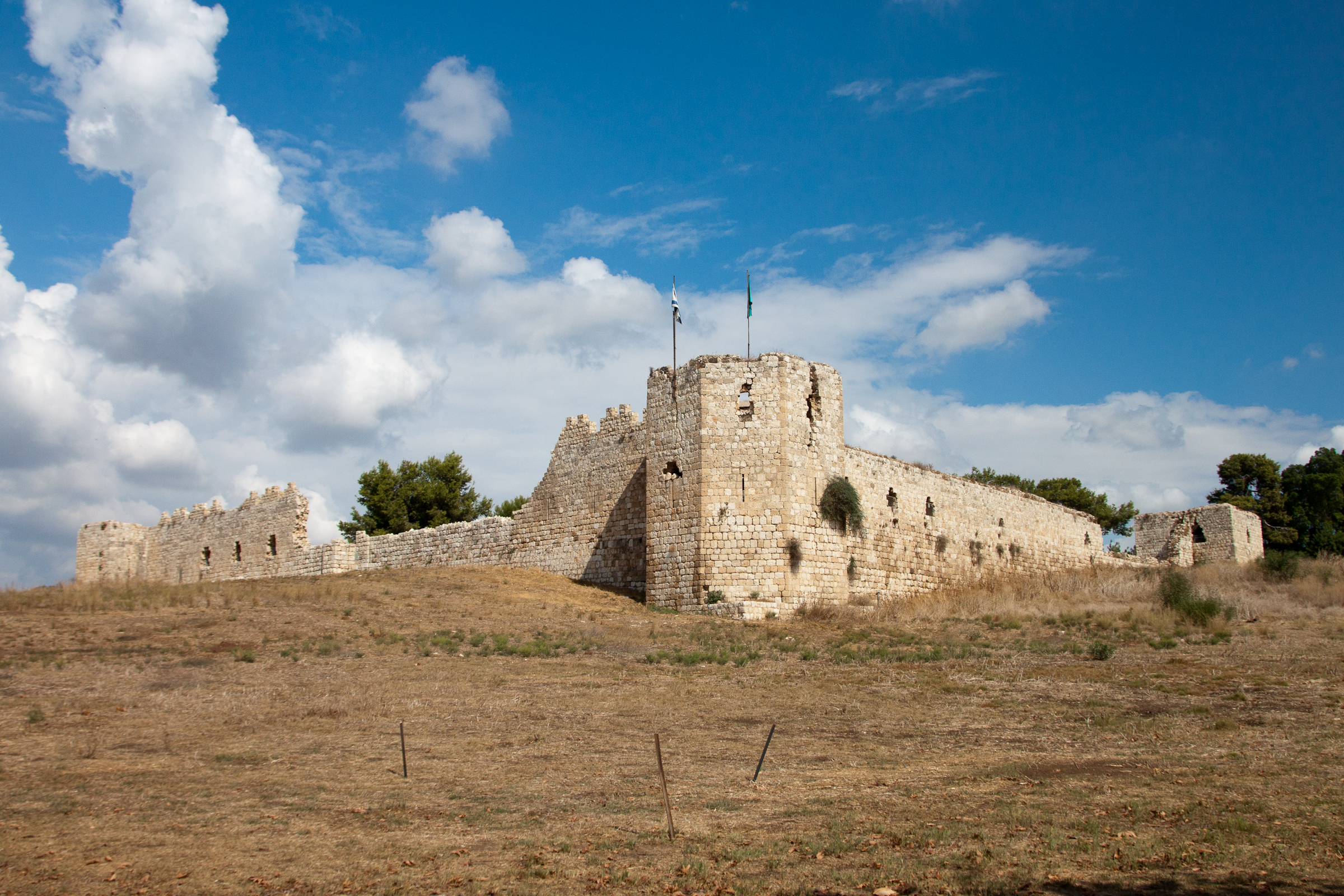
The fortress at Ras al-Ayn

Qasim responded to the arrest of the Jerusalemite notables by cancelling his truce with Muhammad Ali and rallying the rebels of Jabal Nablus. He asserted that the truce negotiations had been a ruse to hold off the rebels until the arrival of reinforcements from Egypt. The rebels' strategy in Jabal Nablus was to split their forces (30,000 fighters) into three divisions and fight Ibrahim Pasha's troops on three fronts: Ras al-Ayn, the approaches of the Galilee, and Nablus city. On 24 June Bedouin not directly affiliated to Qasim's irregulars attacked Ibrahim Pasha's camp in Palestine's coastal plain. Four days of battle then followed between the rebels and Ibrahim Pasha's men at Ras al-Ayn, until the fortress in that village was captured by the Egyptians on 28 June.

On 30 June Muhammad Ali landed in Jaffa with 15,000 troops from Egypt and on 2 July he convened with his son Ibrahim Pasha at Ramla, which was captured along with Lydda by Egyptian commander Salim Pasha who led Ali's military convoy. In Ramla, the arrested Jerusalemite notables were assembled. Ali ordered the arrest of rebel leaders Qasim, his sons Yusuf and Muhammad, Abdullah Jarrar and Isa al-Barqawi. Ali then instructed his ally Bashir Shihab II of Mount Lebanon to back Egyptian forces in the Sidon Eyalet. Meanwhile, Sulayman Abd al-Hadi and Ibrahim Abu Ghosh requested the release of Jabr Abu Ghosh from prison. In return for the allegiance of the Abu Ghosh clan, Ali heeded their request, released Jabr and appointed him mutassalim of Jerusalem in place of Muhammad al-Qasim, who had defected to the rebels at the start of the revolt.

Jabr immediately commenced an operation to disarm the people of the Jerusalem region, ordering the execution of anyone found with a weapon. Ali personally ordered the decapitations of the mutasallims of Ramla and Lydda and of the headmen of rebellious villages near Jaffa. Acre was recaptured by the Egyptians and 2,000 of its inhabitants were killed in the process. After receiving personal assurances from Husayn Abd al-Hadi that he would enforce Ibrahim Pasha's rule in Palestine, Ali departed for Egypt on 6 July.

Ibrahim Pasha continued his expedition against the rebels of Jabal Nablus, pursuing them at Zeita. Ninety rebels were slain while the rest fled to Deir al-Ghusun, situated on a hilltop to the east of Zeita. At Deir al-Ghusun, many of the inhabitants and rebels heeded a call by Husayn Abd al-Hadi to flee once the Egyptian troops arrived. In response, Qasim had several of the defectors among his ranks killed. Ibrahim Pasha's troops stormed the hill and the rebels (mostly members of the Qasim, Jarrar, Jayyusi and Barqawi clans) were routed, suffering 300 fatalities. Most of the surviving rebels, including Qasim and his son Yusuf, who were both wounded, fled. Captured rebels of fighting age were sent to Egypt for professional military training, while older rebels had their right hands cut off.

Following the rebels' rout at Deir al-Ghusun on 14 July, Ibrahim Pasha's troops proceeded to Nablus unhindered, passing through Arraba, the loyalist stronghold of the Abd al-Hadi family, and then through Sanur, the throne village of the Jarrar clan. When they entered Nablus on 15 July, no resistance was put up, and shortly afterward, the rest of Jabal Nablus submitted to Muhammad Ali's troops. For the most part, due to the loyalty of the Abd al-Hadi's to Muhammad Ali, and the neutrality of the powerful Nimr clan, the inhabitants of the city of Nablus had not participated in the revolt. From Nablus, Ibrahim Pasha dispatched his troops north to occupy Jenin and Nazareth, before returning to Jerusalem on 20 July with 30,000 new conscripts.

=== Rebel surrender in Galilee ===
When Muhammad Ali was in Palestine, he requested military assistance from Emir Bashir of Mount Lebanon, via an emissary, Emir Bashir's son Amin. In late July, Emir Bashir led his forces toward Galilee, but before advancing further southward, he made a number of proclamations advising that the rebels of Safad surrender. The rebel leadership in Safad agreed to negotiate and sent Sheikh Salih al-Tarshihi as an emissary to Bashir to arrange a meeting. Bashir invited the leaders of Safad to the village of Bint Jbeil where they agreed to surrender and submit to Egyptian authority. Afterward, Bashir arrived in Safad where he arranged for rebel leaders from nearby areas to surrender as well.

=== Battle of Hebron ===
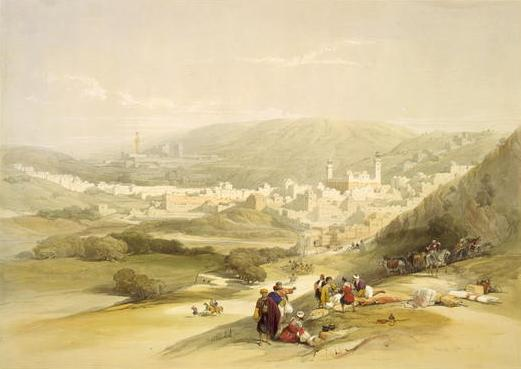
An 1839 drawing of Hebron by David Roberts, in The Holy Land, Syria, Idumea, Arabia, Egypt, and Nubia

Qasim and some of his men headed south to the Hebron Hills after their defeat in Jabal Nablus. They confronted Ibrahim Pasha's troops at Solomon's Pools, but were defeated after brief clashes. Afterward they fled to the city of Hebron. On 4 August Ibrahim Pasha's troops besieged the city, leveling its fort by cannon fire. The fort was never restored. They then ransacked the city, and decisively defeated Qasim's forces. According to historian Roger Heacock, the rebels and the townspeople "fought bravely and desperately, but they suffered severely from artillery fire."

Mass killings and rapes by the Egyptian troops took place in Hebron. About 500 people were killed, and 750 men were taken as conscripts. Another 120 adolescents were taken by Egyptian officers "to do with as they wanted", according to historian Baruch Kimmerling. According to Joseph Schwarz, a historian and rabbi who wrote A Descriptive Geography and Brief Historical Sketch of Palestine in 1850, most of the Muslim population managed to flee beforehand to the nearby hills. Some of the Jewish community stayed behind, and during the general pillage of the town, twelve of them were killed. The majority however, like most of the Jews of Safad and Tiberias, fled to Jerusalem.

=== Execution of rebel leadership ===
Qasim, his sons Yusuf and Muhammad, and Isa al-Barqawi fled Hebron during the fighting and headed east across the Jordan River. They were sheltered in al-Karak by a Bedouin clan affiliated with the Anizzah tribal confederation. Ibrahim Pasha's troops pursued them and laid siege on al-Karak for 17 days. After a hole was blasted into the town's walls in late August, al-Karak was destroyed and the orchards outside the town were uprooted as punitive measures against the residents for hosting Qasim. Fearing further retaliation from Ibrahim Pasha, the Anizzah clan's chief, Duwaikhi al-Samir, handed over the rebel leaders to the Egyptians.

After his capture, Qasim, Arsab al-Kahol, one of Qasim's lieutenants, and al-Barqawi were publicly executed in Damascus. Qasim's sons Yusuf and Muhammad were executed in Acre. His two youngest sons Uthman and Ahmad were exiled to Cairo, Egypt. Ibrahim Pasha also had several other rebellious sheikhs (chiefs) executed in Damascus, including Isa al-Amr of Dura, Ali Rabbah and Abd al-Jabir Barghouti of Bani Zeid, Yusuf Salama of Seluh, Ismail ibn Simhan of Ras Karkar and Ismail Majali of al-Karak. Several other sheikhs were jailed in Acre.

=== Aftermath ===
The 1834 revolt and the immediate aftermath reduced the male population of Palestine by about one-fifth. This decrease is attributed to the large numbers of peasants who were either deported to Egypt to work in manufacturing, drafted into Egypt's military, or abandoned their villages and farms to join the Bedouin nomadic populations. Around 10,000 peasants were deported to Egypt and the general population was disarmed. The conscription orders were extended beyond the Muslim population to the local Christians. Taxes were also extended from landed property to include livestock as well. As Ibrahim consolidated his hold over Palestine and disarmed the population, banditry by local tribesmen and civil strife was largely eliminated.

Abandoned or rebellious villages were destroyed by Ibrahim Pasha's troops, which prevented their inhabitants from returning. Ibrahim's army razed 16 villages before taking Nablus. He also forced the heads of the Nablus clans to leave for nearby villages. The absence of the traditional local leadership due to exile or execution left Palestine's urban population to be financially exploited by both the government and its local opponents. The imprisoned headmen of villages were replaced by their sons, although Ibrahim Pasha demoted them as nawatir (watchmen) instead of the higher-ranking title of mukhtar. Qasim's son Mahmud replaced him and the popularity of his father among the peasantry compelled the rural chiefs of Jabal Nablus to request from the government that Mahmud replace Sulaiman Abd al-Hadi as mutasallim of Nablus.

Ottoman rule was subsequently reinstated in 1840 after Acre was recaptured with the critical support of the Royal Navy. The peasants who were drafted into Muhammad Ali's army returned to their hometowns following the reassertion of Ottoman rule. Not long after the end of Egyptian rule, the intermittently recurring civil strife between the Qays and Yaman tribo-political factions resumed in parts of central Palestine. Throughout the 1840s until the 1860s, the Ottomans launched their own modernization reforms, known as the Tanzimat, throughout the empire with varying degrees of success. Coinciding with these efforts, the international powers began a tug-of-war of influence in Palestine as they sought to extend their protection over the country's religious minorities, a struggle carried out mainly through their consular representatives in Jerusalem.

== Combatants and arms ==
=== Rebels ===
The peasants from the mountainous regions of Palestine and Bedouin (nomadic) warriors constituted the bulk of the rebels' forces. Most adult males among the peasantry owned a rifle (typically of the matchlock variety, ownership of which normally transferred from generation to generation) or less frequently, a pistol. The latter were often used in urban environments where they were more effective. A wide array of melee weapons were also utilized, including scimitars (generally used by Bedouin fighters), daggers, javelins, or different types of clubs (generally used by peasant fighters).

The most active rebel forces hailed from Jabal Nablus. The principal rebel clans were the Qasims of Beit Wazan, the Jayyusi clan of Kur, the Jarrar family of Sanur and the Barqawi family of Shufa. Qasim al-Ahmad led the forces of Jabal Nablus. In the greater Jerusalem region, the main rebel clans were Sam'an of Ras Karkar, Barghouti of Bani Zeid and, until their defection to Ibrahim Pasha, Abu Ghosh of Qaryat al-Inab. They were often supported by Qasim's men. The Bedouin Ta'amirah tribe from the Bethlehem region also played a major role in the fighting around Jerusalem. In the Hebron Hills, the rebels were led by the Amr clan of Dura while further southwest around Gaza, the Bedouin tribes of Jabarat and Awawna fought against the Egyptians and their Bedouin allies. In the north, the rebel forces around Acre and Haifa were commanded by the Madi family, while the Hawwara irregulars of Aqil Agha, who had defected from Ibrahim Pasha's service, and local sheikhs did most of the fighting in the heart of the Galilee, outside of Safad. In Safad itself, fighters were led by a council dominated by the city's religious leadership.

The combat that peasant men had engaged in prior to the revolt was restricted to the vicinity in which they lived. During armed conflicts, they would often fight for a short period before returning to cultivate their lands, which remained their main preoccupation. When their service was needed, they were commanded by a local chief who in turn was subordinate to a regional leader. Most armed conflict revolved around the chiefs' bids for local influence and control or protection of villages from Bedouin plundering. There were also instances where peasant fighters would be assembled to back Ottoman authority in the face of local or external challengers, such as during the 1799 Napoleonic invasion, or against Ottoman authority when it interfered in the unofficial local autonomy that was enjoyed in the mountain regions. In most of the conflicts in which the peasant fighters participated, they fought alongside their kinsmen or neighbors.

=== Egyptian Army and allies ===
The Egyptian Army in Palestine was divided between infantry and cavalry regiments and consisted of thousands of professional soldiers, known as nezzam. During the revolt, this force was buttressed by over 15,000 reinforcements who arrived with Muhammad Ali, bringing the number of Egyptian soldiers in Palestine to well over 20,000. While its army did most of the fighting, Egypt also commissioned or requested the participation of various irregulars. In the southern Gaza region, Egypt dispatched Bedouin from the tribes of Awlad Ali, al-Jamaiyat, al-Jahma, and al-Fawayd to pursue rebels and raid their villages. In the northern Galilee region, towards the end of the revolt, the forces of Emir Bashir were mobilized upon Ibrahim Pasha's request, but their mobilization sufficed in convincing the northern rebels to surrender. Thus, Bashir's Lebanon-based forces saw no combat. Local peasant fighters under Husayn Abd al-Hadi also fought alongside the Egyptian army, particularly during the final battles for Jabal Nablus.

In contrast with the peasants' arsenals, Egypt's military possessed modern arms and artillery. The use of cannons on open battlefields in particular inflicted heavy losses on the rebels. Egypt's army also possessed considerable organization in contrast to the lack of military coordination between rebel forces in different regions.

== Legacy ==
The revolt in Palestine was markedly different from the revolts that sprung up elsewhere in the Egyptian-ruled Levant, such as the 1838 Druze revolt and those that occurred in the Nusayriyya Mountains and Mount Lebanon. Unlike the other Levantine revolts, the participants were not an ethnoreligiously or socially homogeneous group, but rather an assortment of societal groups from different classes, subcultures, geographical areas and religions. This also significantly distinguished it from previous popular uprisings against Ottoman rule that had occurred in Jerusalem and its vicinity, namely the Naqib al-Ashraf Revolt in 1703–1705 and the revolt of 1825–1826, which failed to attract support from the people of Nablus, Hebron, Galilee and Gaza.

"Palestine" was a term that was used infrequently by its inhabitants at the time of the revolt, and its inhabitants identified themselves as Ottomans or by their religion. However, a "proto-national sense" of Palestine (Filastin) had developed among the people of the Gaza, Jerusalem, Nablus, Lajjun and Safad districts (administratively part of either the Sidon or Damascus Eyalet) by at least the 17th century, according to historian Khaled M. Safi. The 17th century Ramla-based intellectual, Khayr al-Din al-Ramli, used the term often in his fatawat (religious edicts) without specifying its boundaries, suggesting that the population of Palestine was aware of its geographic definition. Historians Baruch Kimmerling and Joel S. Migdal argue that the revolt was a formative event for the Palestinian sense of nationhood, in that it brought together disparate groups against a common enemy. These groups reemerged later to constitute the Palestinian people.

Historian Benny Morris disputed the claim by Kimmerling and Migdal that the revolt was the birth of the Palestinian people writing:

Rather idiosyncratically, Kimmerling and Migdal point to a peasant revolt in Palestine against the Egyptian ruler Muhammad Ali in 1834 as the moment when the Palestinian people was born. The peasants (and the townspeople) refused to supply the Egyptians with the conscripts that they demanded. Within months, the rebels, who did not demand independence or "Palestinian rights" (if pressed to identify their "national" affiliation, they surely would have said they were Ottoman subjects, or "Arabs," or perhaps "residents of the Province of Syria"), were crushed, leaving no "national" values or tradition as a heritage. But Kimmerling and Migdal have it that this was the first of the succession of revolts against foreign occupiers—against the British from 1936 to 1939 and against the Israelis from 1987 to 1991 and from 2000 to 2003—that were to be the main expressions of Palestinian nationalism."

Scholar Shimon Shamir views the Egyptian period in Palestine as the "first application of the concept of the territorial state ... This was the inception of the modern history of Palestine."

The revolt represented a moment of political unity in Palestine. However, the ultimate intention of the notables and rebel leaders was to force out the Egyptian army and reinstate Ottoman rule as a means of restoring the Ottoman-era standards that defined the relationship between the government and the governed. These standards were made up of the religious laws, administrative codes and local norms and traditions that were disrupted by Egyptian reforms. The people of Palestine did not resist Ibrahim Pasha's conquest of Palestine in 1831 as they were decreed to by the Sublime Porte and only acted against his authority three years later when he decisively interfered in their local affairs by way of conscription and further taxation. This constituted the prime motivation for the revolt, rather than loyalty to the Ottomans. The latter did not provide more benefits to the population than offered by Muhammad Ali's rule, but unlike Ali, they largely left the peasants and the local elite to their own devices, not demanding much more than the traditional taxes and nominal acceptance of the sultanate's authority.

=== Palestinian historiography ===
In general, 20th-century historians from Palestine and the Arab world, and Palestinian and Arab nationalists, communists and leftists of all stripes, held a negative view of the Ottoman era, which they associated with backwardness, corruption and tyranny. According to historian Adel Manna, this uniformly negative perception of the Ottomans and the high regard for Muhammad Ali as a modernizer and a liberator of Arab lands from the Ottomans, which he sought to unite under his rule, influenced the later historiography of the 1834 revolt. Another factor that influenced the historians of the 20th century was the limited availability of primary sources from Palestine at the time of the revolt. Most primary Arabic accounts of the events were kept by Egypt's bureaucracy at the time. Other accounts were from European travelers or consuls in the area, while there were no known written 19th-century accounts by people living in Palestine's towns and villages.

By the 20th century, the revolt was also largely absent in the Palestinian collective memory. According to Kimmerling, "the humiliating and traumatic events of 1834 were conveniently erased from the collective memory". During the decades that followed the revolt, the elite classes in Palestine still wanted to maintain healthy relations with the Khedivate in Egypt and the urban population were not keen to glorify a revolt largely led by peasants. This differed from the attitude of the peasantry who continued to hold the revolt's leader, Qasim al-Ahmad, in high regard during the aftermath of the revolt. In the 20th century, the passing along of any oral testimonies from that time period were not sought after and recorded due to the prevailing nationalist atmosphere which largely focused on the anti-Zionist and anti-imperialist struggle in Palestine. Most contemporary Arab sources relied on Asad Rustum's detailed 1938 study, The Royal Archives of Egypt and the Disturbances in Palestine, 1834, which Rustum admittedly states was more or less based on the Egyptian perspective of the revolt.

Due to the aforementioned factors, the revolt was often considered to either be a manipulation of the commoners by a reactionary elite against modernization, a successful Ottoman bid to hamper Egypt's efforts to liberate and unify its Arab lands, or was sidelined. The concept that the revolt's diverse participants were acting based on their own interests and actual grievances rather than manipulation was largely ignored in Palestinian historiography until recent decades.

== See also ==
- List of conflicts in the Near East
- 1936–39 Arab revolt in Palestine
- 1834 looting of Safed

== Bibliography ==
- Ayubi, N. N. (1995). Over-Stating the Arab State: Politics and Society in the Middle East. I.B.Tauris. ISBN 978-1-85043-828-1.
- Ayyad, Abd al-Aziz (1999). Arab nationalism and the Palestinians, 1850-1939. Palestinian Academic Society for the Study of International Affairs.
- Baer, G. (1982). Fellah and Townsman in the Middle East: Studies in Social History. Psychology Press. ISBN 978-0-7146-3126-4.
- Beinin, J. (2001). Workers and Peasants in the Modern Middle East. Cambridge University Press. ISBN 978-0-521-62903-4.
- Doumani, B. (1995). Rediscovering Palestine: Merchants and Peasants in Jabal Nablus, 1700-1900. University of California Press. ISBN 978-0-520-20370-9.
- Finkelstein, L. (1960). The Jews: Their History, Culture, and Religion. Harper.
- Grossman, D. (2011). Rural Arab Demography and Early Jewish Settlement in Palestine: Distribution and Population Density During the Late Ottoman and Early Mandate Periods. Transaction Publishers. ISBN 978-1-4128-4454-3.
- Heacock, Roger (2008). Temps et espaces en Palestine: flux et résistances identitaires. Institut français du Proche-Orient. ISBN 978-2-35159-074-4.
- Jerusalem Academic Press (1972). Asian and African Studies. Vol. 5. Jerusalem Academic Press.
- Kimmerling, B. (2012). Clash of Identities: Explorations in Israeli and Palestinian Societies. Columbia University Press. ISBN 978-0-231-51249-7.
- Kimmerling, B.; Migdal, J.S. (2003). The Palestinian People: A History. Harvard University Press. ISBN 978-0-674-01129-8.
- Kinglake, A.W. (1864). Eothen. Harrison and Sons. p. 291.
- Macalister, R. A. Stewart; Masterman, E. W. G. (1906). "Occasional Papers on the Modern inhabitants of Palestine, part III". Quarterly Statement - Palestine Exploration Fund. 38: 33–50. doi:10.1179/peq.1906.38.1.33.
- Manna, A. (2009). "Rereading the 1834 Revolt Against Muhammad Ali in Palestine and Rethinking Ottoman Rule". In Kamil Mansur; Leila Tarazi Fawaz (eds.). Transformed Landscapes: Essays on Palestine and the Middle East in Honor of Walid Khalid. American University of Cairo Press. ISBN 978-977-416-247-3.
- Mattar, P. (2005). Encyclopedia of the Palestinians (Rev. ed.). New York, NY: Facts on File. ISBN 978-0-8160-5764-1.
- Robinson, E.; Smith, E. (1841). Biblical Researches in Palestine, Mount Sinai and Arabia Petraea: A Journal of Travels in the year 1838. Vol. 3. Boston: Crocker & Brewster.
- Robinson, E. (1856). Biblical Researches in Palestine and the Adjacent Regions: A Journal of Travels in the Years 1838 & 1852. Vol. 2. Murray.
- Rogan, E.L. (2002). Frontiers of the State in the Late Ottoman Empire: Transjordan, 1850-1921. Cambridge University Press. ISBN 978-0-521-89223-0.
- Rood, Judith Mendelsohn (2004). Sacred Law in the Holy City: The Khedival Challenge To The Ottomans As Seen From Jerusalem, 1829-1841. BRILL. ISBN 978-90-04-13810-0.
- Rood, Judith (Summer 2006). "The Time the Peasants Entered Jerusalem: The Revolt Against Ibrahim Pasha in the Islamic Court Sources". Jerusalem Quarterly (27). Institute of Palestine Studies: 28–43. doi:10.70190/jq.I27.p28.
- Rustum, A. (1938). The Royal Archives of Egypt and the Disturbances in Palestine, 1834. American University of Beirut Press.
- Schölch, A. (1984). "The Decline of Local Power in Palestine after 1856: The Case of ʿAqīl Aġā". Die Welt des Islams. New Series. 23 (1/4). BRILL: 458–475. doi:10.2307/1570684. JSTOR 1570684.
- Schwarz, J. (1850). Leeser, Issac (ed.). A Descriptive Geography and Brief Historical Sketch of Palestine. Philadelphia: A. Hart.
- Sharon, M. (2013). Corpus Inscriptionum Arabicarum Palaestinae, H-I. Vol. 5. BRILL. ISBN 978-90-04-25097-0.
- Smith, E.; Kiepert, H. (1874). Biblical Researches in Palestine, and in the Adjacent Regions: A Journal of Travels in the Year 1838. Vol. 2. Crocker & Brewster.
- Spyridon, S. N. (1938). "Annals of Palestine". Journal of the Palestine Oriental Society. XVIII: 65–111.
- Thomson, W.M. (1859). The Land and the Book: Or, Biblical Illustrations Drawn from the Manners and Customs, the Scenes and Scenery, of the Holy Land. Vol. 2 (1 ed.). New York: Harper & brothers.
- Tristram, H.B. (1865). Land of Israel, A Journal of travel in Palestine, undertaken with special reference to its physical character. London: Society for Promoting Christian Knowledge.
- Yaari, Abraham; Schen, Israel; Halevy-Levin, Isaac (1958). The Goodly Heritage: Memoirs Describing the Life of the Jewish Community of Eretz Yisrael from the Seventeenth to the Twentieth Centuries. Youth and Hechalutz Dept. of the Zionist Organization.
- Yazbak, Mahmoud (1998). Haifa in the Late Ottoman Period, A Muslim Town in Transition, 1864–1914. Brill Academic Pub. ISBN 978-90-04-11051-9.
