= Dhour El Choueir =

Dhour El Choueir ضهور الشوير
- City
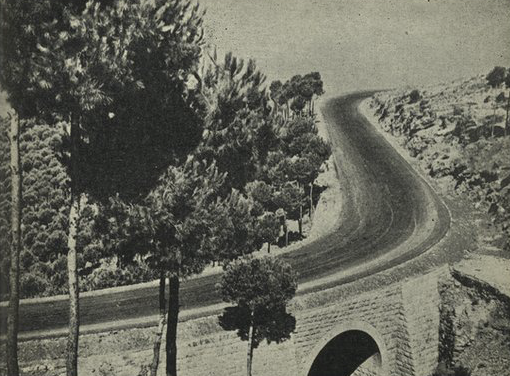
- Dhour El Choueir road - 1947

- Location within Lebanon
- Coordinates: 33°54′43.32″N 35°42′32.54″E
- Country: Lebanon
- Governorate: Mount Lebanon Governorate
- District: Matn District
- Elevation: 1,200 m (3,900 ft)
- Time zone: UTC+2 (EET)
  - Summer (DST): UTC+3 (EEST)
- Dialing code: +961

Dhour El Choueir (Arabic: ضهور الشوير, romanized: Ḍhūr ash-Shuwayr), sometimes Dhour Shweir, is a mountain town in Lebanon ('dhour' meaning 'summit, top [of a mountain]') located in the Matn District. It lies slightly north of the main Beirut - Damascus highway, overlooking the city of Beirut and the Mediterranean sea, some 30 km from Beirut and 42 km from Beirut International Airport in Khalde. This mountain town is one of Mount Lebanon's favored summer resorts, known for its extraordinary fresh air and is also important for its August yearly carnival, honoring Lebanon's emigrants. It is linked to Beirut via the Matn Express Highway, also known as the M90 through Baabdat.

== Demographics ==
The inhabitants of Dhour El-Choueir are predominantly Christians, with half of the population being Greek Orthodox, while the other half is mostly Melkite and Maronite.

== History ==
The town was on the front line during the Lebanese Civil War from 1975 to 1990.

== Education ==
- Dhour Shweir Public Secondary School

== Notable people ==
- Antoun Saadeh (1904—1949), founder and historical leader of the Syrian Social Nationalist Party (SSNP).
- Tanios Bou-Nader Khneisser, father of the Sword & Shield Folkloric Dance.
- Jafet/Yafeth family (Naameh, Chedid, Benjamin Yafeth), family of local aristocracy who immigrated to Brazil towards the end of the 19th century and became business tycoons of that country.
- Abraham Rihbany (1869—1944), a writer on politics and religion.
- Khalil Hawi (1919—1982), one of the most famous Lebanese poets of the 20th century.
- Asad Rustum (1897—1965), Lebanese historian, academic and writer.
- Salwa Nassar (1913—1967), Lebanese nuclear physicist and college administrator.
- The family of Edward Said (1935—2003) regularly vacationed in the resort, and Said was married there (1962).
- Sammy Clark (1948—2022), Lebanese Singer.
- George Howie (1901—1979), American racing driver.
- Elias Bou Saab, Lebanese politician.

== See also ==
- Souk El Gharb
- Lebanese Civil War
- Mountain War (Lebanon)
- People's Liberation Army (Lebanon)
