= 1834 Jerusalem earthquake =

19th-century earthquake

An earthquake that affected Jerusalem occurred on 26 May 1834. This occurred during the peasants' revolt in Palestine and shortly after the start of the Siege of Jerusalem. Multiple religious structures were damaged by the earthquake. The impact of the earthquake was felt in Dhiban, Madaba, Al-Rahba, Umm ar-Rasas, Jaffa, and Caesarea.

== Earthquake ==
An earthquake occurred in Palestine on 26 May 1834. This earthquake occurred in the midst of the peasant's revolt in Palestine and shortly after the start of the Siege of Jerusalem. After a brief lull, fighting resumed the next day.

Damage from the quake included the collapse of part of the city wall near the Dome of the Rock, the collapse of the dome over the Chapel of the Ascension, a minaret in the city and one on the Mount of Olives, the collapse or damage of several large Jerusalem homes, and the severe damage of Latin and Armenian monasteries in Bethlehem. The outer enclosure of the Al-Aqsa Mosque was damaged. Several minarets collapsed and part of the dome of the Church of the Holy Sepulchre cracked.

The earthquake affected Bethlehem, where the Church of the Nativity was damaged. The impact of the earthquake was said to extend to Dhiban, Madaba, Al-Rahba, Umm ar-Rasas, Jaffa, and Caesarea. It not possible to locate the epicentral of the earthquake.

Ibrahim Pasha of Egypt approved repairs to Christian monasteries damaged in the earthquake; these repairs started on 5 September 1834, and finished in July 1836. French and Russian funding was provided to repair the Church of the Holy Sepulchre.

== Works cited ==
=== Books ===
- Ambraseys, Nicholas (2015). Earthquakes in the Mediterranean and Middle East: A Multidisciplinary Study of Seismicity up to 1900. Cambridge University Press. ISBN 9781139195430.
- Cline, Eric (2010). Jerusalem Besieged: From Ancient Canaan to Modern Israel. University of Michigan Press. ISBN 9780472025374.
- Peters, F. (1985). Jerusalem: The Holy City in the Eyes of Chroniclers, Visitors, Pilgrims, and Prophets from the Days of Abraham to the Beginnings of Modern Times. Princeton University Press. ISBN 0691073007.

=== News ===
- Bar-Am, Shmuel (25 January 2020). "Golgotha to the Six Day War: Stroll through time on a newly opened Old City wall". Times of Israel. Archived from the original on 5 November 2026.

== Bibliography ==
- Rood, Judith Mendelsohn (2004), Sacred Law In The Holy City: The Khedival Challenge To The Ottomans As Seen From Jerusalem, 1829–1841, BRILL, ISBN 9789004138100
- Spyridon, S. N. (1938). "Annals of Palestine, 1821–1841: Manuscript". Journal of the Palestine Oriental Society. XVIII: 65–111.
