= Sami Clark =

Lebanese singer (1948–2022)

- سامي كلارك
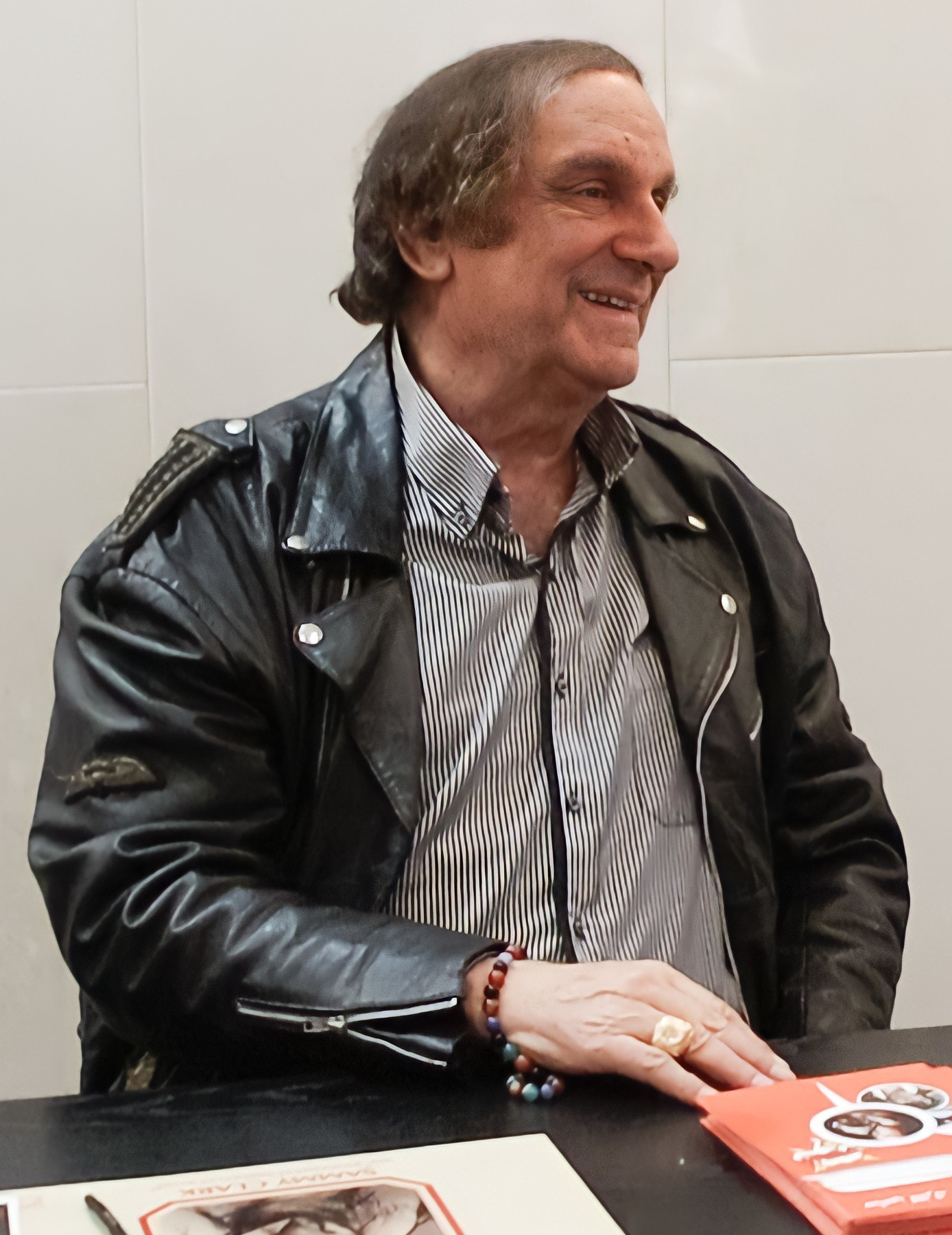
- Sami Clark in 2019
- Born: Sami Hobeika; 19 May 1948; Dhour El Choueir, Lebanon
- Died: 20 February 2022 (aged 73); Beirut, Lebanon
- Occupation: Singer

Sami Clark (Arabic: سامي كلارك; 19 May 1948 – 20 February 2022) was a Lebanese singer, who had his career peak in the 1980s.

== Life and career ==
Clark began his music career in the late 1960s, a few years after joining the Faculty of Law at the Jesuit University in Beirut without graduating there.

He won several international prizes throughout his lifetime, such as the Menschen und Meer prize in Austria for his song Mori Mori, which granted him international recognition. His songs are characterized by romanticism and his distinct operatic voice. Besides Arabic (Lebanese) and English, Clark sang in Armenian, French, Italian, and Russian. He was famous for performing the score of popular cartoons in the 1980s, most notably for singing the Arabic theme song of the Japanese anime "Grandizer." Clark was also the head of the union of Lebanese artists. He briefly performed as part of a trio called "The Golden Age" with his fellow Lebanese singers, Prince Al Sagheer and Abdo Munzir.

He died on 20 February 2022, at the Saint George Hospital University Medical Center in Beirut, at the age of 73.

== Selective songs ==
=== English ===
- What I need
- Mori Mori
- Take me with you
- Amazing Man
- Dog Man
- Dog Man and the Adventures of the Wild West
- Dog Man to the Rescue
- Dog Man Fights Again
- Dog Man: The Final Chapter

=== Arabic ===
- Koumi ta norkos ya sabiyeh (قومي تنرقص يا صبية, "Let's dance, girl")
- Liman toughanni al touyour (لمن تغني الطيور, "For whom the birds sing")
- Ah Ah ala hal Iyyam (آه آه على هالأيام, "Oh, those days!")
- Tami (تامي)
- Grendizer Theme Song
- Treasure Island Theme Song
- Eltili W W3adtini (قلتيلي ووعدتيني, "You Told Me and You Promised Me")
