= Joel S. Migdal =

American academic (born 1945)

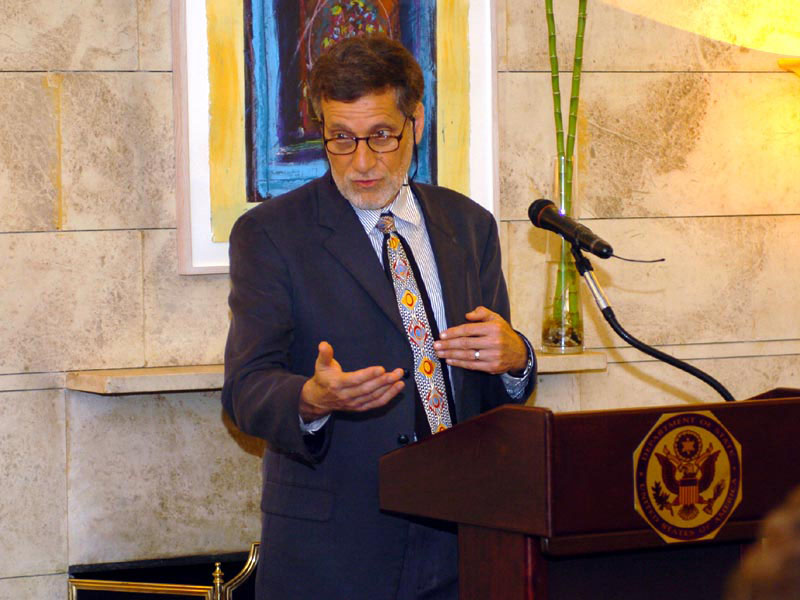

Personal details
- Born: April 1, 1945 Roosevelt, New Jersey
- Children: Ariela Migdal; Tamar Azous; Amram Migdal
- Education: Harvard University; Rutgers University
- Profession: Professor Emeritus; Author; Lecturer

Joel S. Migdal is the Robert F. Philip Professor of International Studies in the University of Washington's Henry M. Jackson School of International Studies. He is a political scientist specializing in comparative politics.

== Education ==
He received a B.A. from Rutgers University in 1967. He then earned an M.A. (1968) and Ph.D. (1972) from the Department of Government of Harvard University.

== Career ==
Previously he served as an associate professor of government at Harvard University (1975–80) and a lecturer and senior lecturer at Tel Aviv University (1972–75). He came to the University of Washington in 1980 and was named the Robert F. Philip Professor of International Studies in 1994.

== Memberships ==
- Member editorial board, Comparative Political Economy Book Series, School of Government at Peking University, China
- President, Association for Israel Studies, 2003–2005
- Vice-president, Association for Israel Studies, 2001–2003
- Editor, Studies on Israel series of the University of Wisconsin Press
- Member, Visiting Committee, Harvard University Center for Middle Eastern Studies
- Chair, Visiting Committee, Harvard Academy of International and Area Studies
- Member, Editorial Board, Israel Studies Forum: An Interdisciplinary Journal, 2001–present.
- Member, Editorial Board, World Politics, 1996–present.
- Member, Editorial Board, Comparative Political Studies, 1992–present.
- Member, American Political Science Association.
- Member of the International Joint Committee for the Near and Middle East, Social Science Research Council, 1988–1996. Chair of Committee, 1991–92, 1992–93, 1993–96.

== Awards and honors ==
- Fellowship, Institute for Advanced Study, Princeton, NJ, 2009–2010
- Provost Distinguished Lecturer, University of Washington, 2008
- Marsha L. Landolt Distinguished Mentor Award, University of Washington, 2006
- Lady Davis Fellow, Hebrew University of Jerusalem, 2002–2003
- Governor's Writers Award, 1994, for Palestinians: The Making of a People
- Distinguished Teaching Award, University of Washington, 1993
- Student Service Award, Henry M. Jackson School of International Studies, University of Washington, 1992 (awarded in recognition of outstanding service to students in the International Studies Program)
- Yavor Prize for the best work on developing countries, 1986, awarded by the David Horowitz Institute for the Research of Developing Countries for Strong Societies and Weak States: State Society Relations and State Capabilities in the Third World.
- Principal Investigator for three major federal grants (Department of Education, Washington, D.C.) totalling well over $1 million
- World Society Fellowship (1989–90)
- Fulbright Research Fellowship (declined)
- Fulbright-Hayes Research Fellowship (1985–86)
- Phi Beta Kappa
- Harvard University Graduate Prize Fellowship
- Woodrow Wilson National Fellowship

== Publications ==
- "Shifting Sands: The United States in the Middle East", (New York: Columbia University Press, forthcoming fall 2013)
- "Boundaries and Belonging: States and Societies in the Struggle to Shape Identities and Local Practices", (editor) (New York: Cambridge University Press, 2004).
- "The Palestinian People: A History", (with Baruch Kimmerling) (Cambridge, MA: Harvard University Press, 2003).
- "Through the Lens of Israel: Explorations in State and Society", (Albany: State University of New York Press, 2001).
- "State-in-Society: Studying How States and Societies Transform and Constitute One Another": (New York: Cambridge University Press, 2001).
- Joel S. Migdal, Atul Kohli, Vivienne Shue, eds., State Power and Social Forces: Domination and Transformation in the Third World (New York: Cambridge University Press, 1994).
- Joel S. Migdal, "Palestinians: The Making of a People": (with Baruch Kimmerling ) (New York: The Free Press, 1993). Paperback edition, Harvard University Press, 1994. Italian edition (I palesti¬nesi: la genesi di un popolo), La Nuova Italia, 1994—second Italian edition, 2003; Hebrew edition, Keter, 1999. Serialized by Al-Ithihad (Israeli newspaper in Arabic), Jan.-March 2000. Arabic edition, The Palestinian Forum for Israeli Studies (Madar), 2001.
- Ellis Goldberg, Resat Kasaba, and Joel S. Migdal, eds., "Rules and Rights in the Middle East: Democracy, Law and Society", (Seattle: University of Washington Press, 1993).
- "Strong Societies and Weak States: State-Society Relations and State Capabilities in the Third World", (Princeton, NJ: Princeton University Press, 1988).
- Joel S. Migdal, et al., "Palestinian Society and Politics", (Princeton, NJ: Princeton University Press, 1980).
- John D. Montgomery, Harold D. Lasswell, and Joel S. Migdal, eds., "Patterns of Policy: Com-parative and Longitudinal Studies of Population Events" (New Brunswick, NJ: Transaction Books, 1979).
- "Peasants, Politics, and Revolution: Pressures Towards Political and Social Change in the Third World" (Princeton, NJ: Princeton University Press, 1974) Chinese edition, 1996.
