= Siege of Jerusalem (1834) =

1834 siege of Jerusalem
- Part of Peasants' Revolt of 1834 (Palestine)
Date	21 May – 7 June 1834
Location	Jerusalem, Egyptian-controlled southern Syria (Palestine) 31°47′00″N 35°13′00″E
Result	Egyptian victory; Rebels repelled; On June 7, Ibrahim Pasha approached the city with Egyptian reinforcements.; On June 9, rebel reinforcements from Nablus were defeated before they could approach the city.

Belligerents
Egypt Eyalet	Rebel clans of Palestine

Commanders and leaders
Ibrahim Pasha; Rashad Bey	Unknown

Strength
~12,000	~20,000

Casualties and losses
Hundreds killed	Hundreds killed
- Unknown

The siege of Jerusalem of 1834 took place during the Peasants' revolt in Palestine, which erupted following the entry of Egyptian general Ibrahim Pasha into Ottoman Syria and his subsequent military conscription demand upon the Arab villagers of the region. The siege was engaged by local Arab peasant rebels upon an Egyptian garrison of about 2,000 soldiers, beginning from May 21 until the arrival of Ibrahim Pasha's main force on June 7. The crushing defeat of rebel reinforcements took place on June 9, led by Ibrahim Pasha.

== Background ==
During the spring of 1834 discontent in Hebron and Nablus had begun to mount over Ibrahim Pasha's plans to conscript local men into his army. On 18 May, fighting broke out in Hebron and on 21 May a large rebel force dispatched on Jerusalem.

== The siege ==
=== Arrival of rebel forces ===
Nearly 6–7,000 rebels marched on Jerusalem from Hebron, aiming to capture it from the Egyptians. At the time, the city had a garrison of some 2,000 men, while Ibrahim Pasha was based with the main forces at his headquarters in Jaffa. Pasha's troops in Jerusalem closed the city gates, and stationed 500-600 soldiers at the Jaffa Gate, where the first attack was expected.

On 22 May 1,000 troops marched out of the city hoping to engage the rebels in the open, but failed to make contact with them. They returned to the city after sacking the village of Lifta. That night there was much shooting from outside the walls. On 26 May, the siege commenced with no food or water getting into the city. The defenders had two cannons, which they moved around the walls to disperse attacks. They could not rely on the loyalty of the city's Muslims and had to remain on duty day and night.

=== Earthquake ===
In the early afternoon of 26 May, the area was shaken by two earthquakes with after-shocks and further strong quakes occurring until after midnight. Due to the quake, part of outer enclosure of the al-Aqsa Mosque collapsed as well as several houses and the tops of some minarets. The rebels however continued firing throughout. The following day there were further tremors.

=== Rebel attack ===
On 28 May, the rebels launched a strong attack but were repelled. Food and fuel shortages were beginning to be felt in the besieged city. Four days later, after midnight 1 June, the Egyptian garrison suddenly retreated into the castle. The following night, the troops briefly counter-attacked but returned into the castle, while the rebels entered the city looting shops. By 4 June the city, except for the castle, was under the control of the rebels. Two days later they retreated and the soldiers emerged from the castle, apparently looking for food.

On 7 June Ibrahim Pasha arrived with one regiment and six pieces of artillery, having fought his way up from Jaffa for three days and nights.

=== Defeat of rebel reinforcements ===
On 9 June, two hours North of Jerusalem, an Egyptian force from the city with reinforcements, consisting of 2,000 cavalry and 4,000 infantry engaged rebels approaching from Nablus. 1,500 rebels were killed and 11 taken prisoner. On 16 June, three hours to the South, near Solomon's Pools, the army were less successful and had to fight their way back to the city.

On 18 June, a plague broke out in Jerusalem.

== Aftermath ==
The following month the Egyptian army occupied and disarmed Nablus, confiscating 1,500 guns. The Egyptians then attacked Hebron on 1 August, where the last of the rebels have retreated. The town was given over to plunder and all Muslim inhabitants that could be found killed.

On 16 August Commodore Paterson, US Navy, reached Jerusalem with his family, 16 officers and a surgeon. Three weeks later the surviving American Missionaries were evacuated to Beirut.
