= Asad Rustum =

Lebanese historian (1897–1965)

- أسد رستم
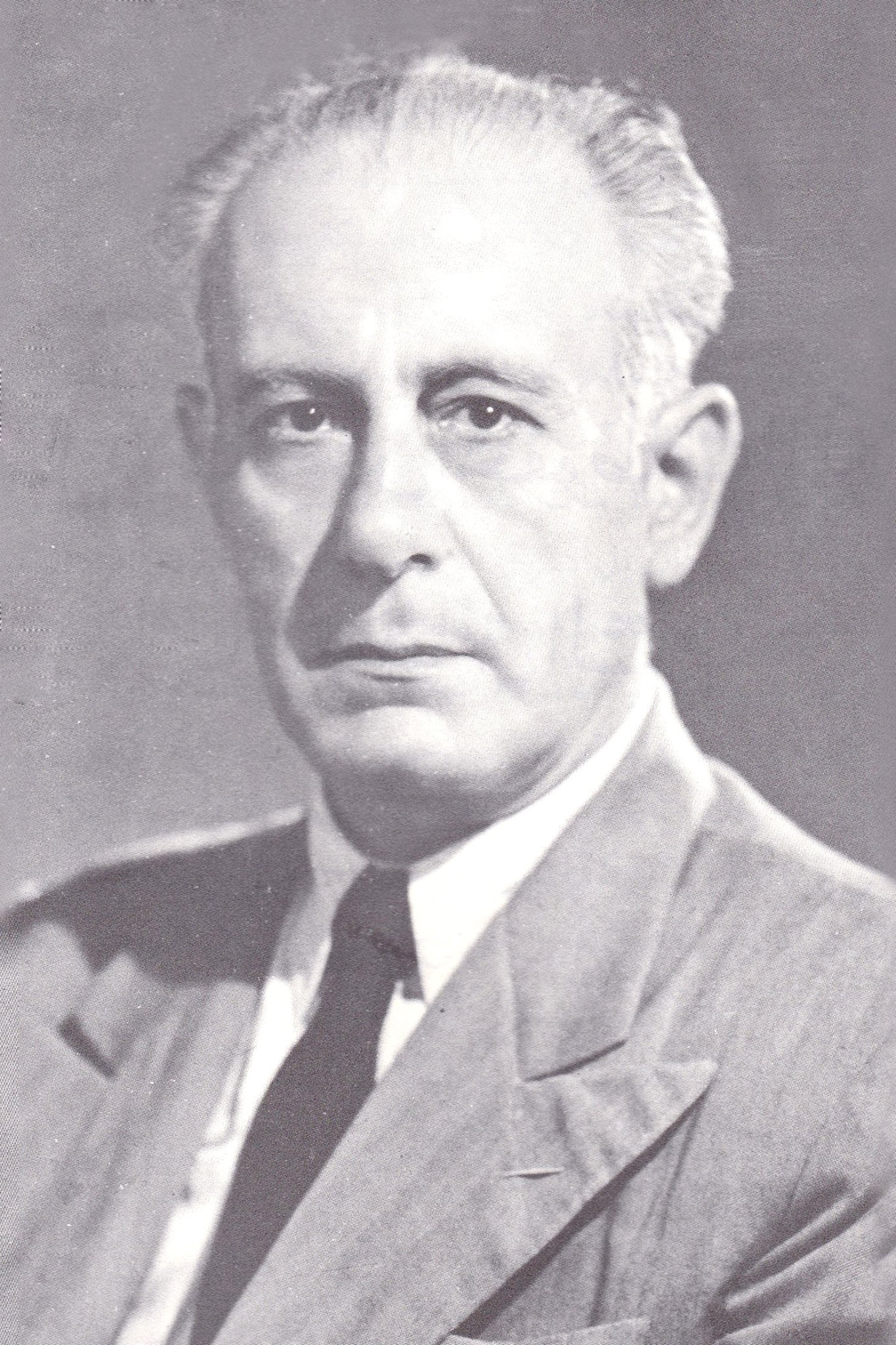
- Born: Asad bin Jibra'il Rustum Muja'is; 4 June 1897; Dhour El Choueir, Lebanon
- Died: 23 June 1965 (aged 68)
- Occupations: Historian, academic, and writer

Asad bin Jibrāʼīl Rustum Mujāʻiṣ (Arabic: أسد بن جبرائيل رستم مجاعص; 4 June 1897 – 23 June 1965) was a Lebanese historian, academic and writer. He published more than 15 books on the history of the Middle East.

== Life ==
Rustum was born in Dhour El Choueir on 4 June 1897. He obtained his bachelor's and master's degree from the American University of Beirut in 1919, then a PhD in History of the Middle East from the University of Chicago in 1923. He then went back to Beirut, where he taught History of the Middle East at the American University of Beirut until his resignation in 1943. He was awarded the Order of Civil Merit of the Syrian Arab Republic and the Lebanese order of merit in 1964.

Rustum died on 23 June 1965.
