= Abu Ghosh clan =

Palestinian clan

The Abu Ghoshes (also written AbuGosh/ AbouGhawsh), known as "ancien seigneurs feodaux", are an old wealthy landowning family, who ruled the Jerusalem mountains and controlled the pilgrimage route from the coast to Jerusalem during the Ottoman Empire.

== Origins of the family ==
Some historians are of the opinion that the Abu Ghoshes came from Europe. Others believe that their origins go back to the Crusaders who came to Jerusalem with Richard I of England in the 12th century AD, due to the fact that many of them have blond hair and blue eyes. Members of the family and some other historians hold the view that the clan originally came from the Arabian Peninsula. They were four Emirs of Yemen, who were brothers, who arrived in Egypt and came to the area. Alternatively, the clan were Circassians who established the community in 1520 after the Ottoman Sultan Suleiman took control of the area at the beginning of the Ottoman Empire and granted them control of the pilgrimage route to the holy places of Jerusalem.

The Abu Ghoshes were settled in the 16th century AD on the mountains of Jerusalem, about 10 kilometres (6.2 mi) west of the city of Jerusalem, where they still reside now. It is established that the Abu Ghoshes became related, through marriage, to the people who lived in the area at that time, as well as with the descendants of the Crusaders, who are known to have lived in the same region at the same time. Archaeological excavations have revealed that the site where the Abu Ghoshes live is one of the most ancient inhabited sites in the southern Levant. This site used to be Kiriath-Jearim, a Hebrew name meaning "Town of Forests". Following the Muslim conquest of the Levant, the site was called "kiryat al-Inab", meaning "town of grapes". In the 18th century, this site took the name of the family "kiryat Abu Ghosh", and is now called Abu Ghosh, a small Muslim Israeli Arab town, where the majority of its inhabitants are the descendants of the old feudal family of the 16th century.

== History ==
At the beginning of the Ottoman Empire, Suleiman the Magnificent entrusted the Abu Ghoshes with control of the route from the coast to Jerusalem and granted them official permission, a "firman", to impose a toll on all pilgrims and visitors entering Jerusalem. The churches of Jerusalem also paid an annual one-off tax to the Abu Ghoshes for their visitors.

Palestine was part of Great Syria, and like Syria it was governed by feudal families until the middle of the 19th century. The Abu Ghoshes were among the most well-known feudal families in Palestine, formerly governing over 22 villages. They had self-determination powers in the region. All power was in the hands of the Emir or Scheich (Lord) of Abu Ghosh. The Scheich was also called Zaim or Mutasallem (leader, governor). He dealt with all political, military, economic, social and legal matters. A dispute between two parties was solved by the Scheich and a judgement was made by him and executed with no right of appeal. Seeking revision was sometimes possible if allowed by the Scheich. Any person acting against the local laws or tradition was imprisoned. The Abu Ghoshes used an old crusader church as a prison. The relation between the Abu Ghoshes and the peasants of the villages was a patron-client relation.

According to tradition, any pilgrim or visitor to the holy sites passing through Abu Ghosh had to pay their respects to the Scheich. Some visitors to the holy lands wrote about Lady Stanhope (daughter of a British Lord, niece of the British Prime Minister William Pitt and a relative of Sir Sidney Smith who besieged Napoleon in Akko and had correspondence with the Scheich Ibrahim AbuGhosh) that when she visited Jerusalem in 1811 she stopped in Abu Ghosh to pay her respects to the Scheich. Scheich Ibrahim AbuGhosh found her an interesting woman, and he ordered a formal dinner and spent the night in her company. She came back the next year and the Scheich was delighted to see her again. The next morning, he insisted on escorting her with his guards and servants to Jerusalem.

The houses of the Abu Ghoshes were described by pilgrims and visitors as beautifully constructed stone houses, and the residence of the Scheich was described as "a true palace, a castle, a protective fortress."

In the 19th century, between 1834 and 1860, Abu Ghosh was attacked by military forces three times. The first attack was launched by the Egyptian military forces, led by Ibrahim Pasha, son of Muhammad Ali, in 1832-4 during the Egyptian occupation of Palestine (1831–1840). The castle of Abu Ghosh was destroyed during this campaign. The second attack was in 1853 during the civil war between feudal families under Scheich Ahmad Abu Ghosh, who was 90 years old. He entrusted his nephew Mustafa with the military task force. The third attack on Abu Ghosh was made by the Ottoman military forces, helped and executed by British forces, during the military expedition against the feudal families in the 1860s, under Scheich Mustafa Abu Ghosh. Almost all villages governed by the Abu Ghoshes were bombarded during this battle. Lord Mustapha Abu Ghosh continued to control the Jerusalem mountains against the will of the Ottomans until he died in 1863.

The Ottoman Empire introduced reforms abolishing the feudal system and creating a centralized government with its main location in the Turkish capital. Powers were transferred from feudal families to a Turkish governor representing the Sultan, sitting in the city of Jerusalem. All villages and towns around Jerusalem were part of the Jerusalem District and each village was represented by an elected "Mukhtar".

At the beginning of the 20th century, a nephew of the Mukhtar of Abu Ghosh named Said Abu Ghosh left Abu Ghosh and went to live on his own land, an estate made of 22,000 dunum between Abu Ghosh and the city of Ramla. He built a mansion in his estate near the village of al-Qubab using a German architect. He was known to have hundreds of peasants working in his estate, and offered his protection to all villagers in the region. He was known to have founded a "Sabeel", offering water and a resting place for free to travellers passing through on their way to Jerusalem. He married the daughter of a Turkish General in the Ottoman army who had his residence in the village of al-Qubab. Said Abu Ghosh was loved and respected by the Abu Ghoshes for his contributions and the support he provided.

After the declaration of the British mandate of Palestine in 1920, the main concerns of Said Abu Ghosh were the British occupation. He offered unlimited financial and military help to the Palestinian militants in order to fight the British. He was also known to have bought land in all parts of Palestine, in order to avoid land coming into the hands of the Jews, becoming one of the biggest landowners in Palestine at the time. The reason for preventing Jews from acquiring land were the rumours that were spreading about the Balfour Declaration of 1917, a promise given by the British government to the Jews to create a homeland in Palestine. Lord Abu Ghosh died in 1936 and was buried in his estate.

== See also ==
- Mustafa Dabbagh: Biladuna Filistin, Beirut 1965-1976
