= Gaza City =

City in Palestine

Gaza City مدينة غَزَّة Gaza
- Municipality type A (City)

Arabic transcription(s)
  - Latin (official): Ghazzah
  - Latin (DIN 31635): Ġazzah
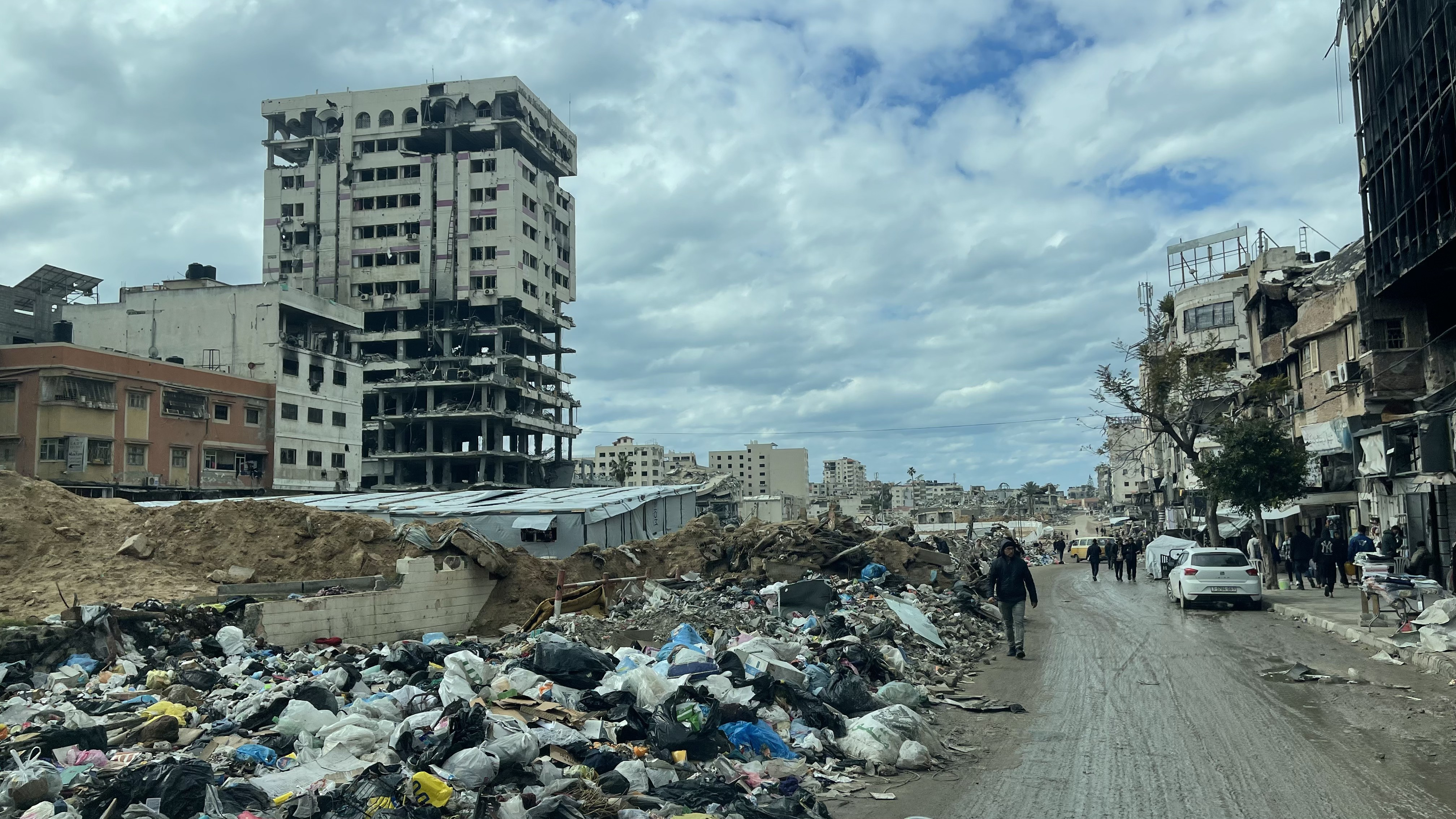
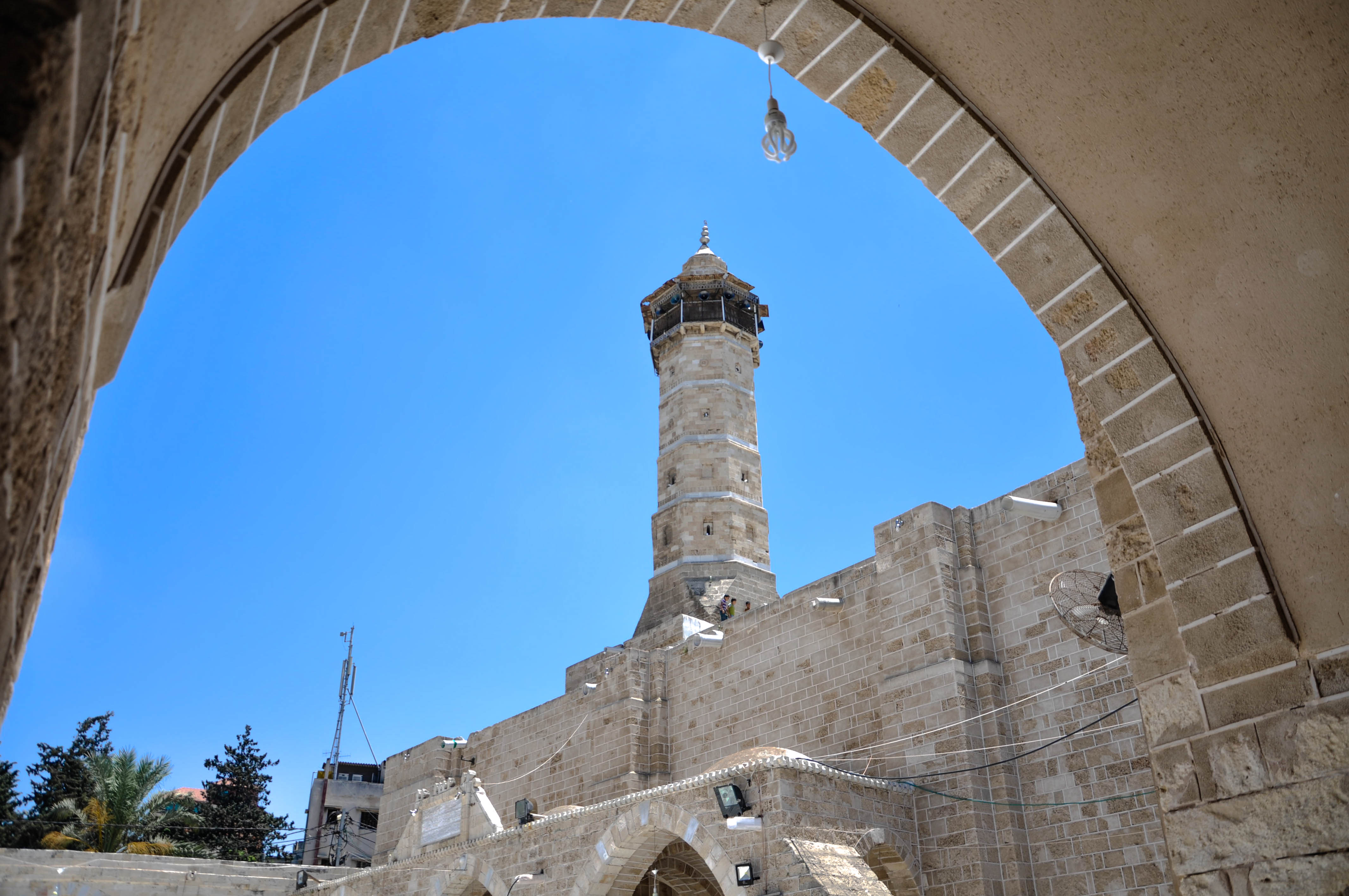
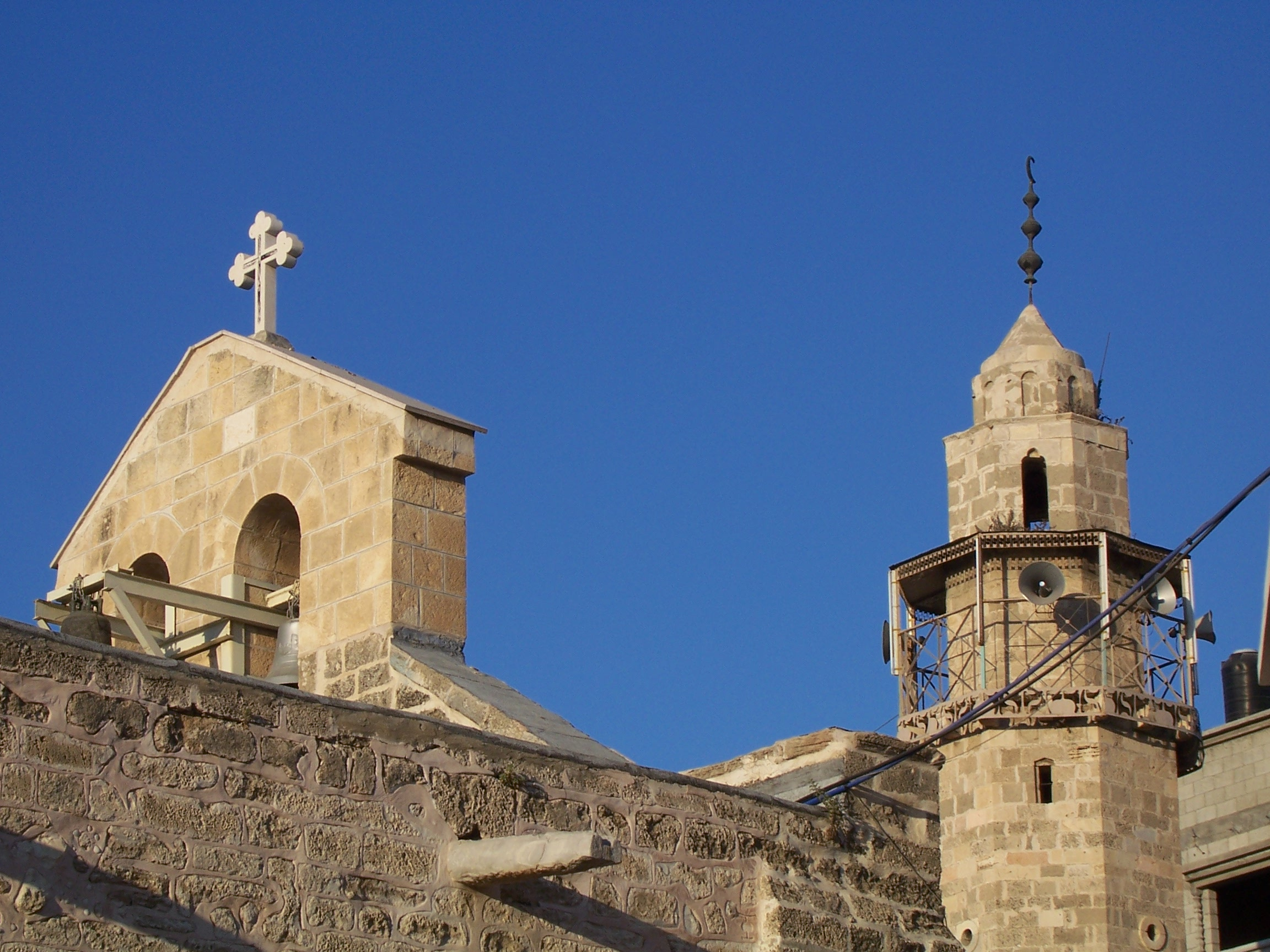
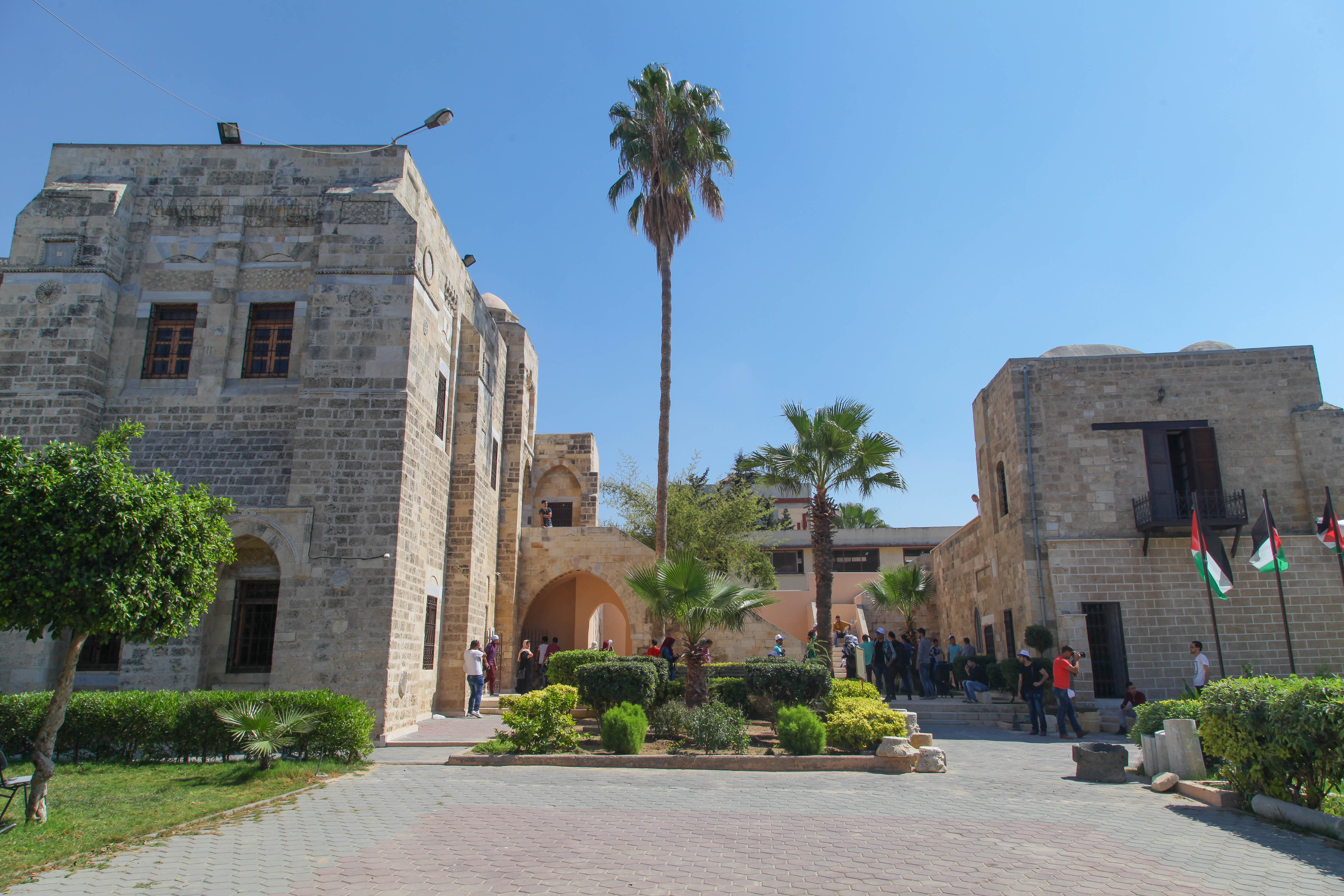
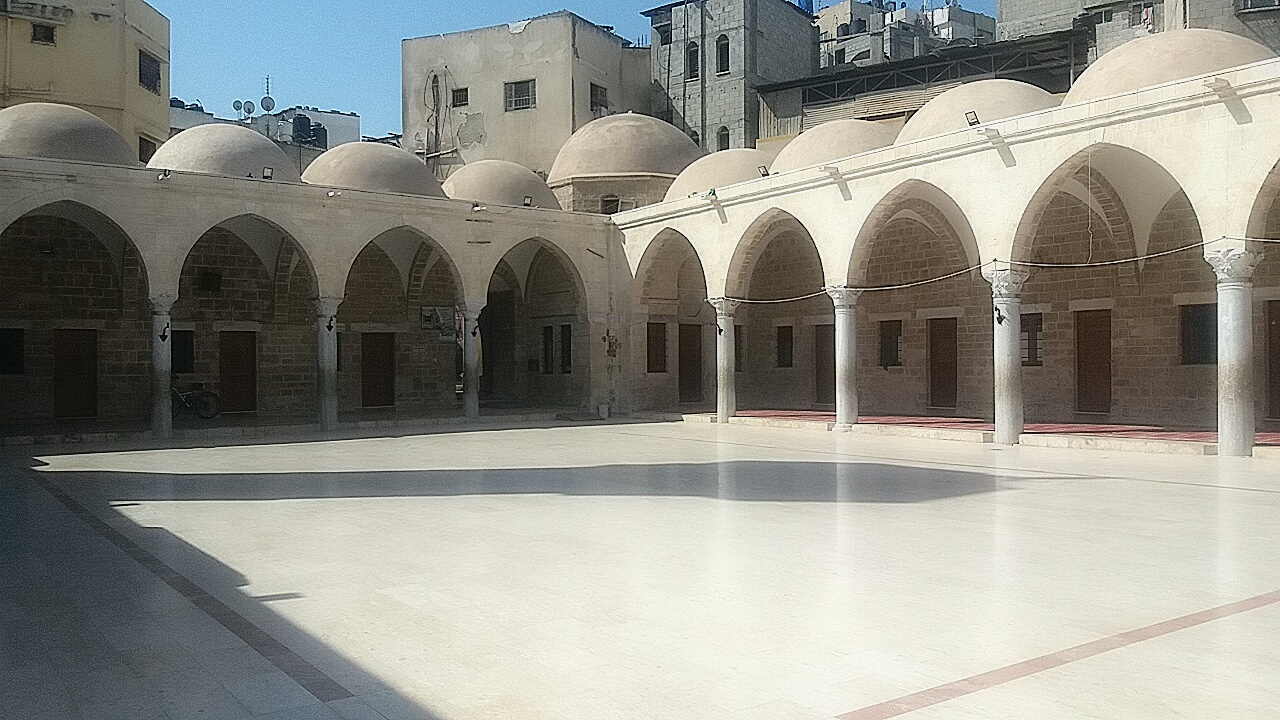
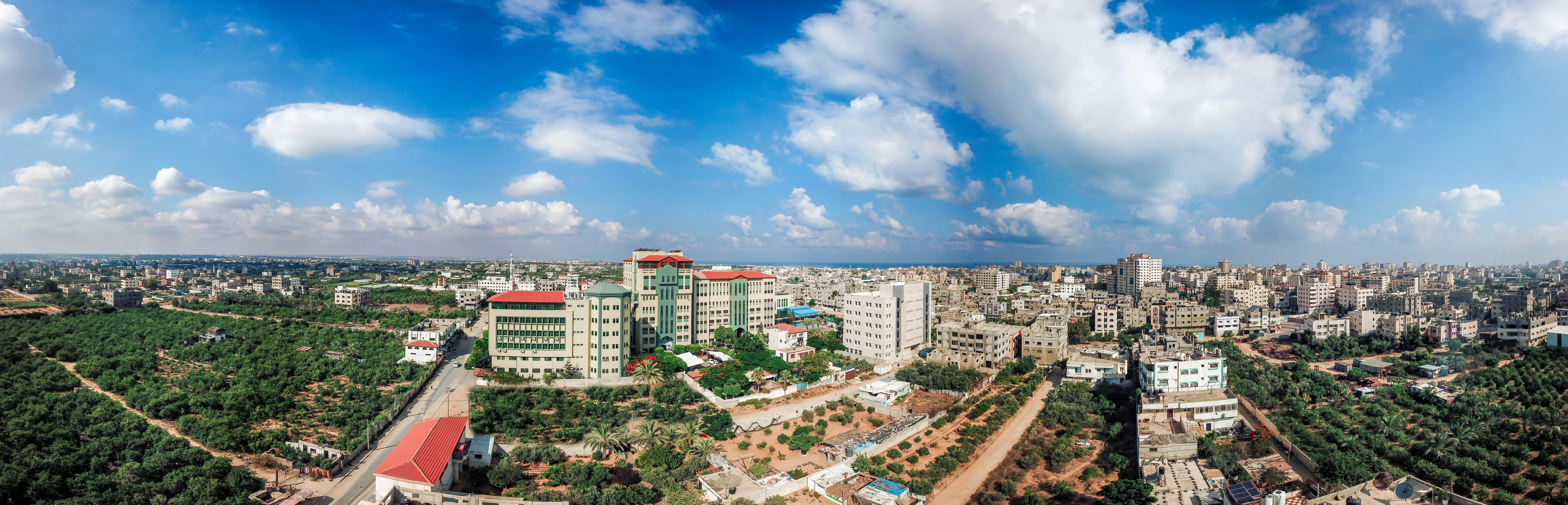
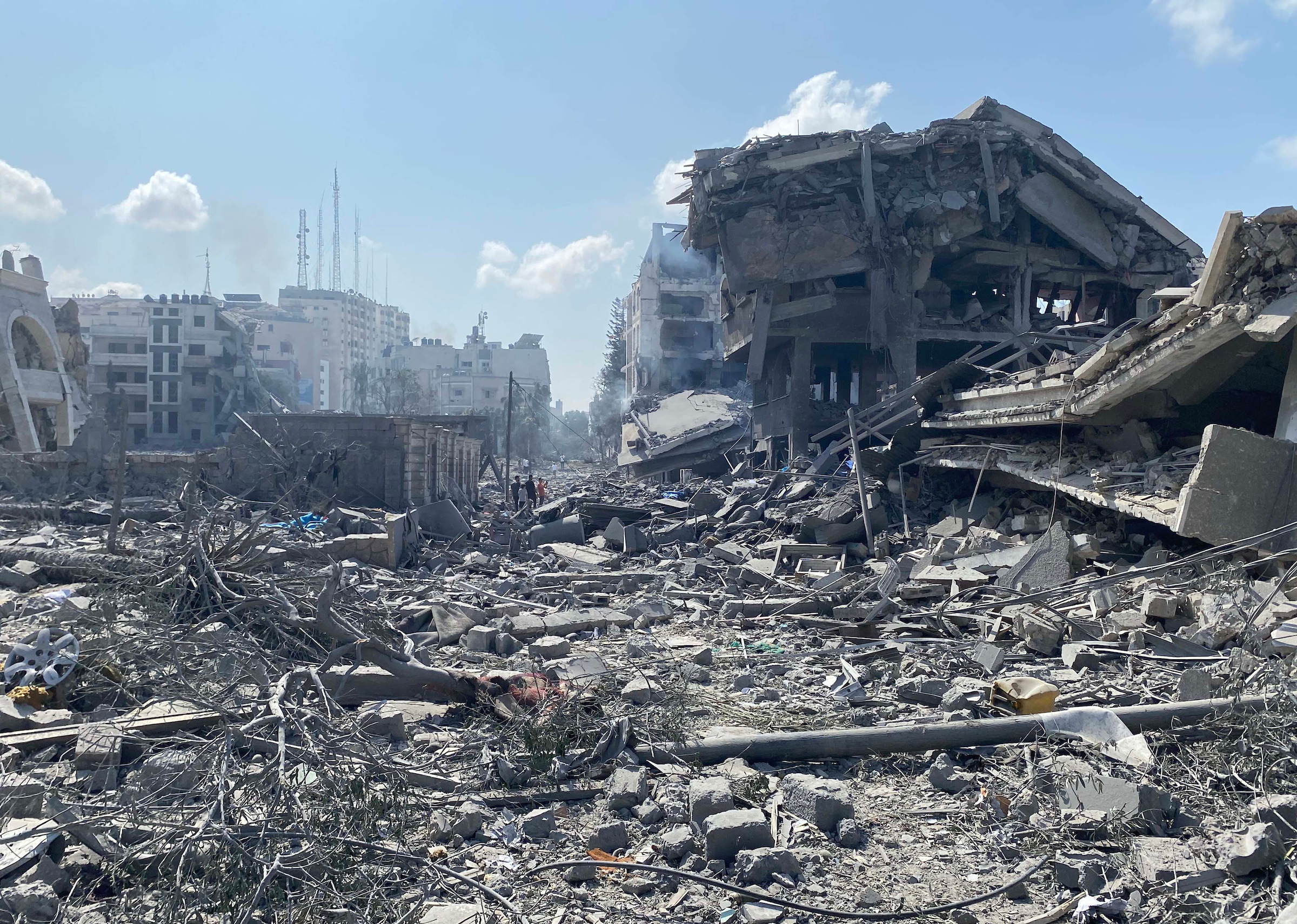
- Omar Mukhtar Street in February 2025 Great Mosque of Gaza Church of Saint Porphyrius Qasr al-Basha Sayed al-Hashim Mosque Rimal before the Gaza war (Note: On 30 December 2023, The Wall Street Journal reported, "According to analysis of satellite data by remote-sensing experts at the City University of New York and Oregon State University, as many as 80% of the buildings in northern Gaza, where the bombing has been most severe, are damaged or destroyed.") Rimal in October 2023

- Coat of arms of Gaza City
- Interactive map of Gaza City
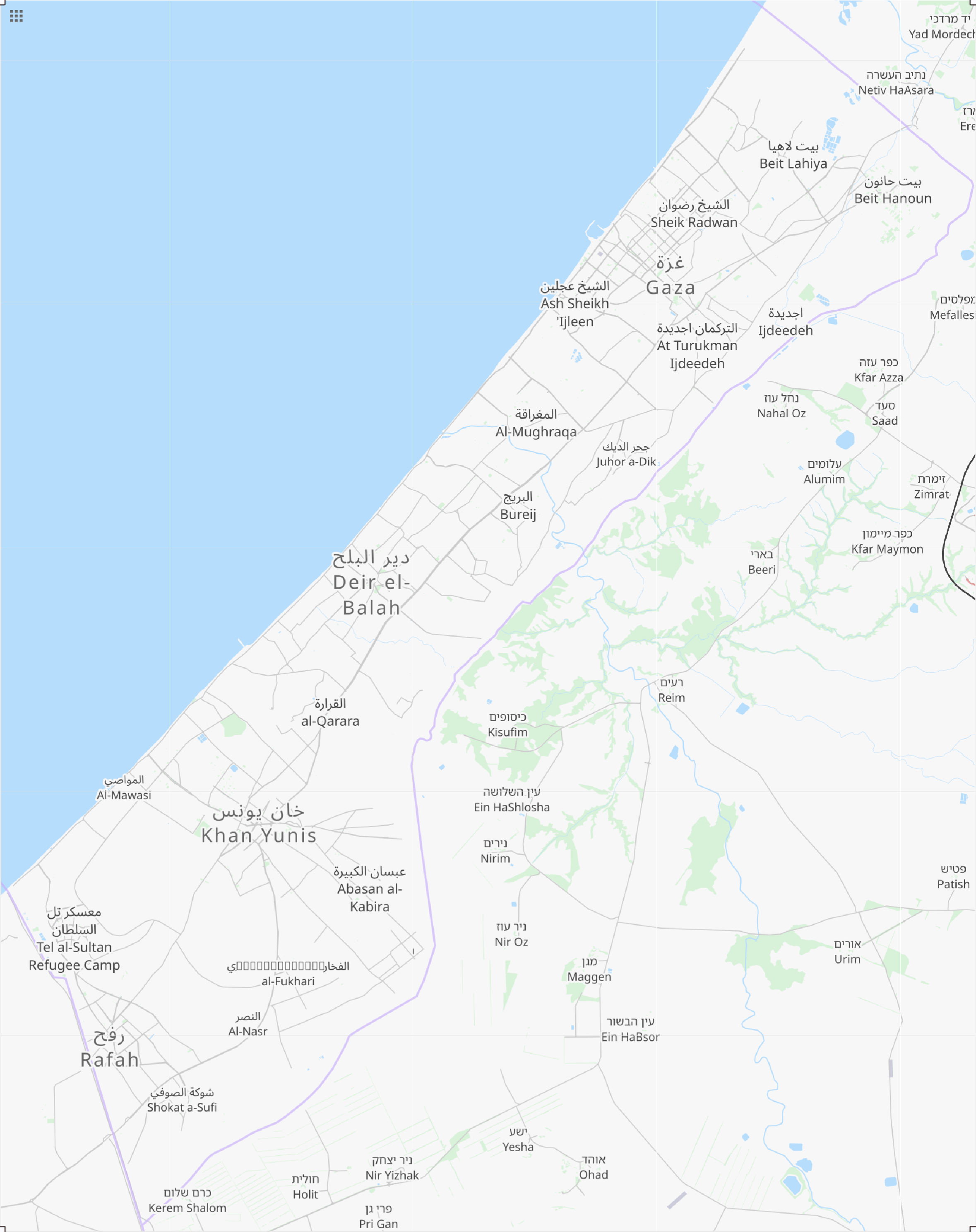
- Location of Gaza within Palestine Gaza City (State of Palestine)
- Country: Palestine
- Governorate: Gaza
- Founded: 15th century BC

Government
  - Type: City (from 1994)
  - Mayor: Yahya Al-Sarraj

Area
  - Total: 45 km^{2} (17 sq mi)

Population (2017 census)
  - Total: 590,481
  - Estimate (2025): 220,000
  - Rank: 1st in Palestine
  - Density: 13,000/km^{2} (34,000/sq mi)
- Website: mogaza.org

Gaza City, (Note: Arabic: مَدِينَةُ ﻏَﺰَّة, romanized: Madīnat Ḡazza) often simply called Gaza, (Note: /ˈɡɑːzə/ GAH-zə; Arabic: غَزَّة, romanized: Ḡazza, IPA: [ˈɣaz.za]; Palestinian Arabic: Ḡazze, IPA: [ˈɣaz.ze]) is a city in the Gaza Strip, Palestine, and the capital of the Gaza Governorate. Located on the Mediterranean coast, 76.6 kilometres (47.6 mi) southwest of Jerusalem, it was home to Palestine's only port. With a population of 590,481 people as of 2017, Gaza City was the most populous city in Palestine until the Gaza war and ongoing genocide caused most of the population to be displaced or killed.

Inhabited since at least the 15th century BC, Gaza City has been dominated by different peoples and empires throughout its history. The Philistines made it a part of their pentapolis after the ancient Egyptians had ruled it for nearly 350 years. Under the Roman Empire, Gaza City experienced relative peace and its Mediterranean port flourished. In 635 AD, it became the first city in the Palestine region to be conquered by the Rashidun army and quickly developed into a centre of Islamic law. However, by the time the Crusader states were established in 1099, Gaza City was in ruins. In later centuries, Gaza City experienced several hardships—from Mongol raids to severe flooding and locust swarms, reducing it to a village by the 16th century, when it was incorporated into the Ottoman Empire. During the first half of Ottoman rule, the Ridwan dynasty controlled Gaza City and the city went through an age of great commerce and peace. The municipality of Gaza City was established in 1893.

Gaza City fell to British forces during World War I, becoming a part of Mandatory Palestine from 1922. As a result of the 1948 Arab–Israeli War, Egypt administered the newly-formed Gaza Strip territory and several improvements were undertaken in the city. Its population rose sharply after the influx of Palestinian refugees displaced by the war and the ensuing Nakba. Gaza City was occupied by Israel in the Six-Day War in 1967, and in 1993, the city was transferred to the newly created Palestinian National Authority. In the months following the 2006 election, an armed conflict broke out between the Palestinian political factions of Fatah and Hamas, resulting in the latter taking power in Gaza. The Gaza Strip was then subject to an Israeli-led, Egyptian-supported blockade. Israel eased the blockade allowing consumer goods in June 2010, and Egypt reopened the Rafah Border Crossing in 2011 to pedestrians. The city has been largely destroyed by Israeli airstrikes since the Gaza war began in October 2023, including a large amount of significant cultural heritage in the Old City of Gaza.

The primary economic activities of Gaza City are small-scale industries and agriculture. However, the blockade and recurring conflicts have put the economy under severe pressure. The majority of Gaza City's Palestinian inhabitants are Muslim, although there is also a Christian minority. Gaza City has a very young population, with roughly 75% under the age of 25. As of November 2026, many residents have fled or been evacuated to the Southern Gaza Strip, or killed as a result of Israel's actions in the north. Therefore, previous recorded or estimated population numbers have become outdated.

== Etymology ==
The name Gaza first appears in the military records of Thutmose III of New Kingdom of Egypt in the 15th century BC, and was mentioned in the Amarna correspondence as Āl Ḫazzati and other variant spellings. In Neo-Assyrian sources, reflecting the late Philistine period, it was known as Ḫāzat. It is clear that the name originates from none of these languages, however.

Based on the city's Hebrew name, עַזָּה ʿAzzā, a common folk etymology insists the name stems from the Semitic root ע-ז-ז ʿayin-zayin-zayin, from which words related to strength and fierceness are derived, but this is unlikely. The ע in the root ע-ז-ז corresponds to a Proto-Semitic *ʿ (/ʕ/) sound (compare Hebrew עַז ʿaz with Arabic عَزَّ ʿazza, both meaning "to be strong, powerful, mighty"), while it is clear from city's name in Arabic (غَزَّة, Ḡazza), Koine Greek (Γάζα, Gắză), and Egyptian (gꜣḏꜣtw) that the name of Gaza was likely originally pronounced with an initial *ḡ (/ɣ/~/ʁ/) sound, and thus cannot have been from the same ע-ז-ז root as עַז ʿaz.

Historically, Muslims often referred to the city as Ḡazzat Hāšim in honor of Hashim ibn Abd Manaf, the great-grandfather of Muhammad who, according to Islamic tradition, is buried in the city.

== History ==
Gaza's history of habitation dates back 5,000 years, making it one of the oldest cities in the world. Located on the Mediterranean coastal route between North Africa and the Levant, for most of its history it served as a key entrepôt of southern Palestine and an important stopover on the spice trade route traversing the Red Sea.

Settlement in the region of Gaza dates back to the ancient Egyptian fortress built in Canaanite territory at Tell es-Sakan, to the south of present-day Gaza. The site was inhabited until about 3000 BC. In about 2600 BC, the settlement was re-founded and this time inhabited by the Canaanites. Tell es-Sakan was abandoned again about 2300 BC. Another urban center known as Tell el-Ajjul began to grow along the Wadi Ghazza riverbed. During the reign of Thutmose III (r. 1479–1425 BC), the city became a stop on the King's Highway, a crucial trade route of the Levant, and was mentioned in the 14th-century Amarna letters as Azzatu. Gaza later served as Egypt's administrative capital in Canaan. Gaza remained under Egyptian control for 350 years until it was conquered by the Philistines in the 12th century BC. In the 12th century BC Gaza became part of the Philistine "pentapolis". Gaza achieved relative independence and prosperity under the Persian Empire.

=== Hellenistic period ===
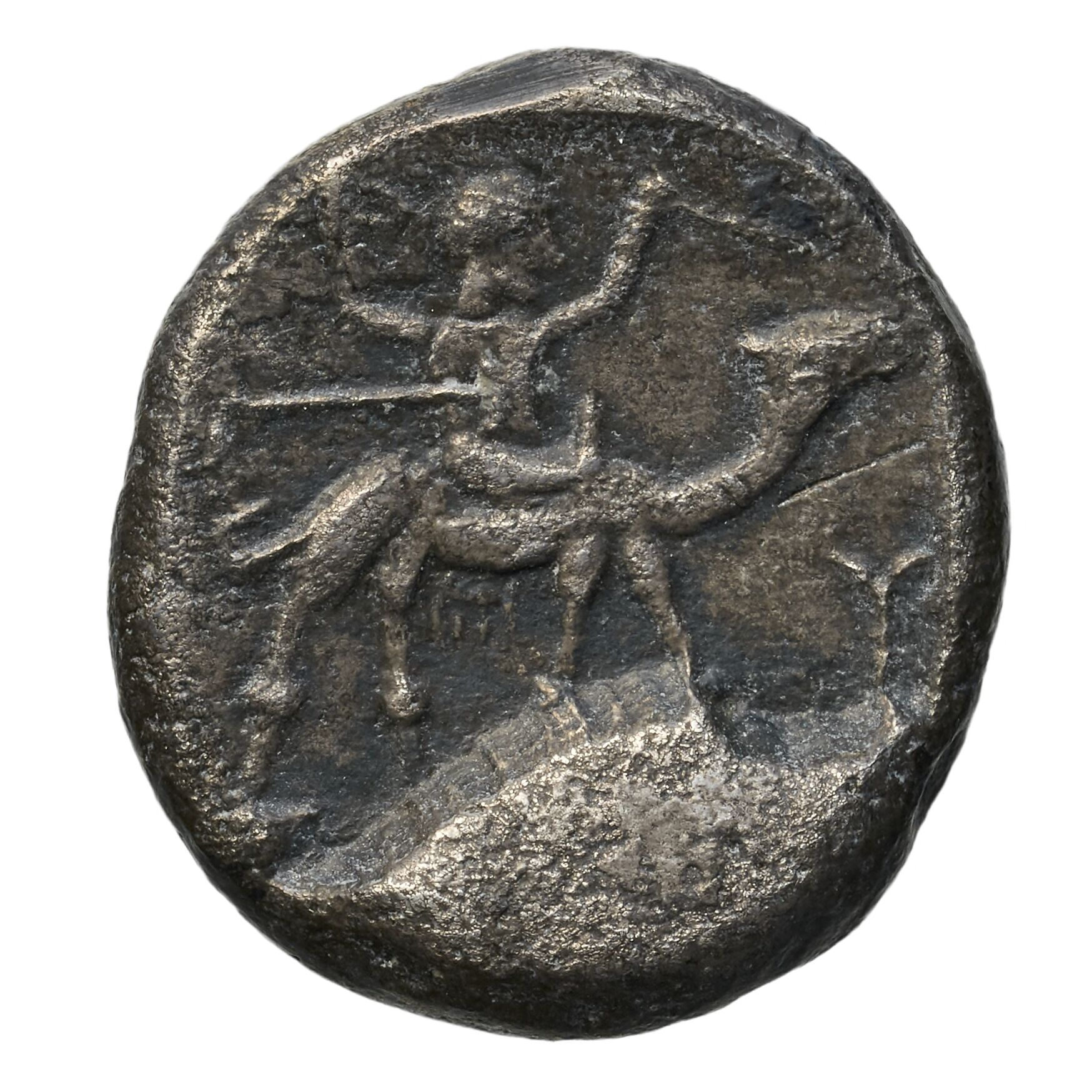
Silver drachma minted in Gaza, Palestine (450-331 BC)

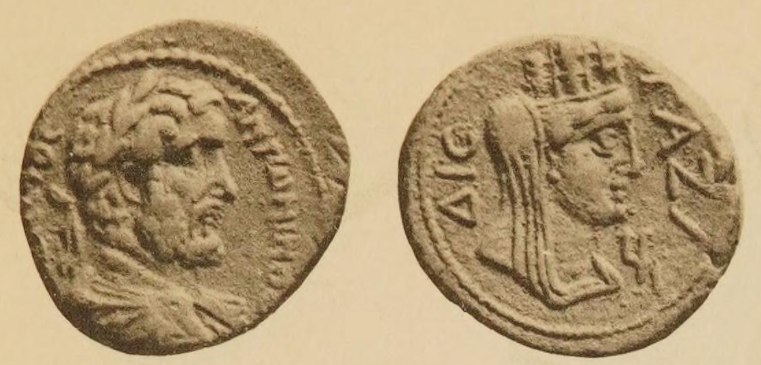
Hellenistic coin from the Gaza mint.

Alexander the Great besieged Gaza, the last city to resist his conquest on his path to Egypt, for five months before capturing it 332 BC; the inhabitants were either killed or taken captive. Alexander brought in people from neighbouring localities to populate Gaza and organized the city into a polis (or "city-state").

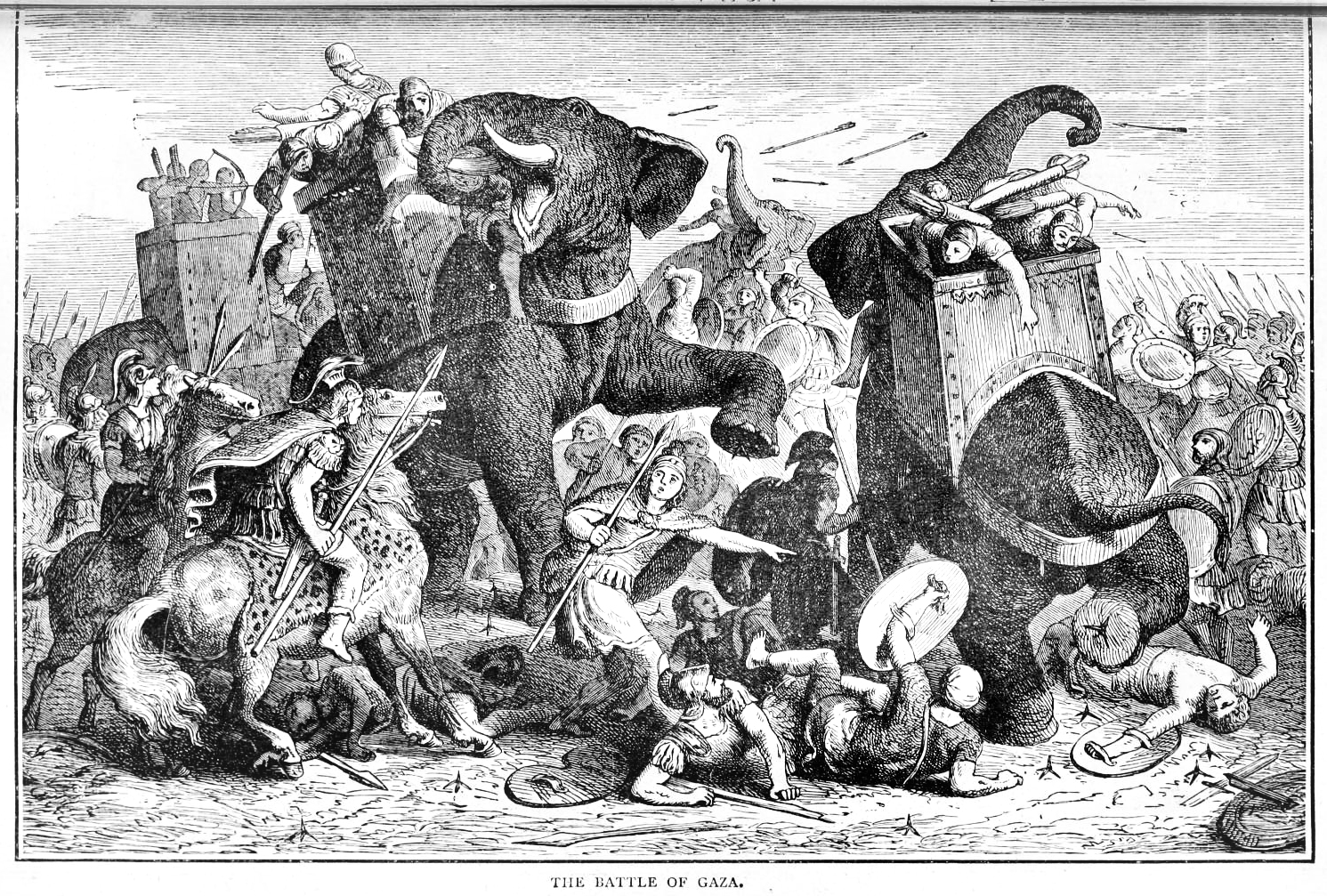
The Battle of Gaza in 312 BC

Under the Seleucid Empire, Seleucus I Nicator or one of his successors renamed Gaza as Seleucia to control the surrounding area against the Ptolemies. Greek culture consequently took root and Gaza earned a reputation as a flourishing center of Hellenistic learning and philosophy. During the Third War of the Diadochi, Ptolemy I Soter defeated Demetrius I Poliorcetes in the Battle of Gaza in 312 BC. In 277 BC, following Ptolemy II's successful campaign against the Nabataeans, the Ptolemaic fortress of Gaza took control of the spice trade with Gerrha and South Arabia.

Gaza experienced another siege in 96 BC by the Hasmonean king Alexander Jannaeus, who "utterly overthrew" the city, killing 500 senators who had fled into the temple of Apollo.

=== Roman period ===
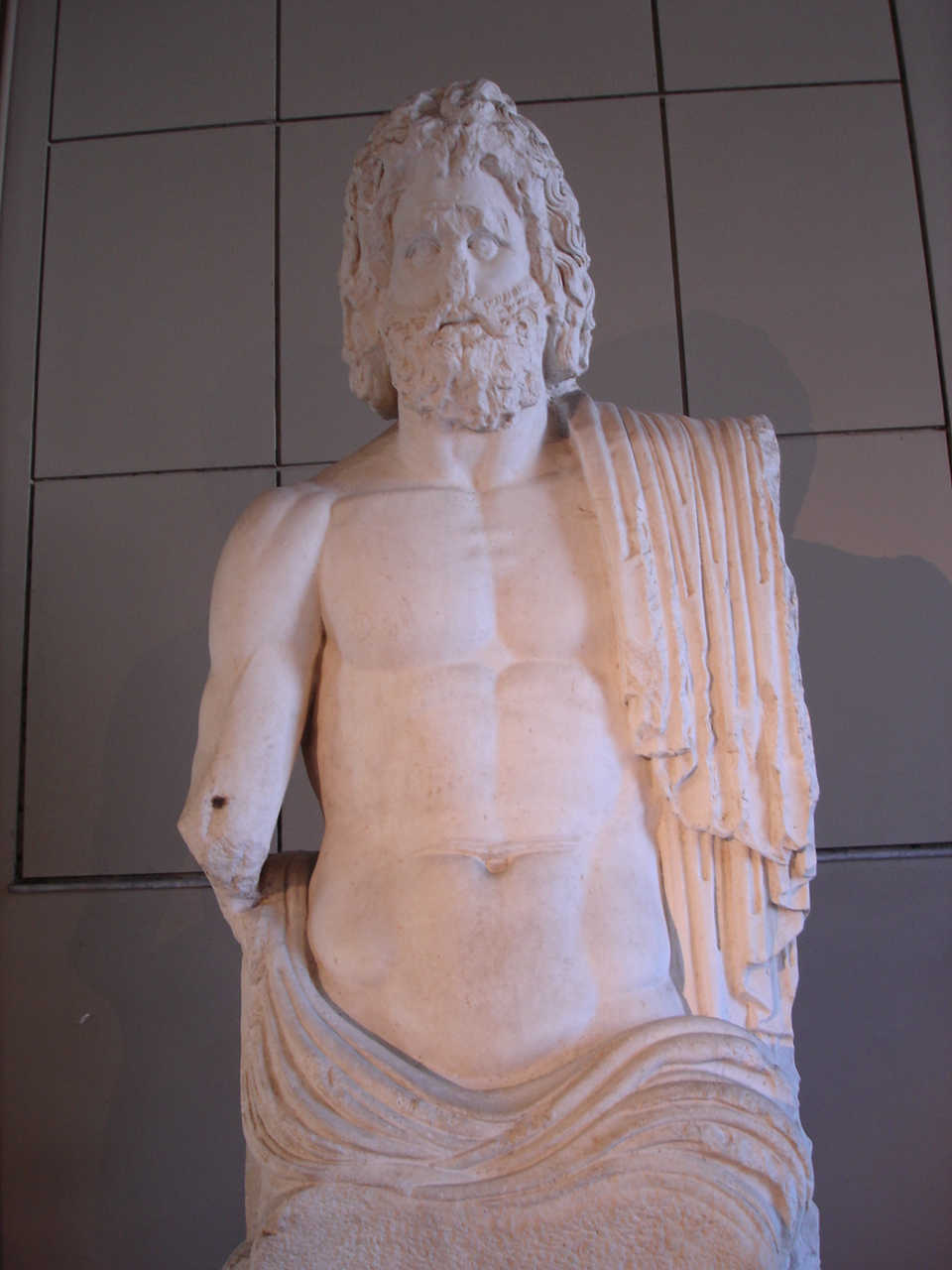
Statue of Zeus that was unearthed in Gaza in the 20th century

Josephus notes that Gaza was resettled under the rule of Antipater, who cultivated friendly relations with Gazans, Ascalonites and neighboring cities after being appointed governor of Idumaea by Jannaeus.

Rebuilt after it was incorporated into the Roman Empire in 63 BC under the command of Pompey Magnus, Gaza then became a part of the Roman province of Judaea. It was targeted by Jewish forces during their rebellion against Roman rule in 66 and was partially destroyed. It nevertheless remained an important city, even more so after the destruction of Jerusalem during the First Jewish–Roman War. Following this, and again at the end of the Bar Kokhba revolt (132–136 CE), captives were sold into slavery in Gaza.

Throughout the Roman period, Gaza was a prosperous city and received grants and attention from several emperors. A 500-member senate governed Gaza, and a diverse variety of Greeks, Romans, Phoenicians, Jews, Egyptians, Persians, and Bedouin populated the city. Gaza's mint issued coins adorned with the busts of gods and emperors. During his visit in 130 AD, Emperor Hadrian personally inaugurated wrestling, boxing, and oratorical competitions in Gaza's new stadium. The city was adorned with many pagan temples; the main cult being that of Marnas. Other temples were dedicated to Zeus, Helios, Aphrodite, Apollo, Athena and the local Tyche. Christianity began to spread throughout Gaza in 250 AD, including in the port of Maiuma. First evidence of a Bishop of Gaza is from early 4th century, when St. Sylvan served in that capacity.

=== Byzantine period ===
Following the division of the Roman Empire in the 3rd century, Gaza remained under the control of the Eastern Roman Empire, which in turn became the Byzantine Empire. The city prospered and was an important center for southern Palestine. A Christian bishopric was established at Gaza. Conversion to Christianity in Gaza was accelerated under Porphyry of Gaza between 396 and 420. In 402, Theodosius II ordered all eight of the city's pagan temples destroyed, and four years later Empress Aelia Eudocia commissioned the construction of a church atop the ruins of the Temple of Marnas. It was during this era that the Christian philosopher Aeneas of Gaza called Gaza, his hometown, "the Athens of Asia." The large Gaza synagogue existed in the 6th century, according to excavations.

=== Early Islamic period ===
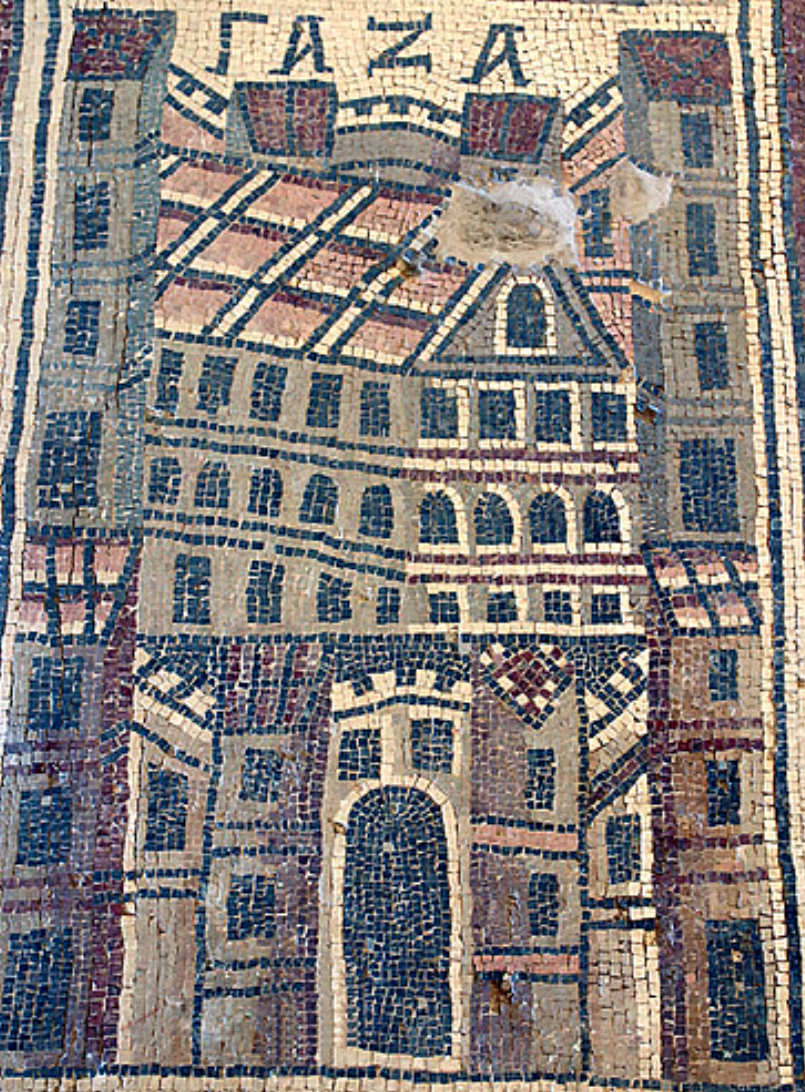
Depiction of a Gaza building in the Byzantine Umm ar-Rasas mosaics, c. 8th century, during the Abbasid Caliphate

In c. 638 Gaza was captured by Arab Muslim forces under Amr ibn al-As, in the years following the Battle of Ajnadayn between the Byzantine Empire and the Rashidun Caliphate in central Palestine. It was captured by Amr's forces about three years later. Believed to be the site where Muhammad's great-grandfather Hashim ibn Abd Manaf was buried, Gaza was not destroyed and its inhabitants were not attacked by Amr's army despite the city's stiff and lengthy resistance, though its Byzantine garrison was massacred.

The arrival of the Muslim Arabs brought significant changes to Gaza; at first, some of its churches were transformed into mosques, including the present Great Mosque of Gaza (the oldest in the city). It was later rebuilt by Sultan Baybars, who endowed it with a huge manuscript library containing over 20,000 manuscripts in the 13th century. A large segment of the population swiftly adopted Islam, and Arabic became the official language. In 767 Muhammad ibn Idris ash-Shafi'i was born in Gaza and lived his early childhood there; he founded the Shafi'i school, one of the four major schools of fiqh (law) in Sunni Islam.

Security, which was well-maintained during the early Muslim rule, was a key factor in Gaza's prosperity. Although alcohol was banned in Islam, the Jewish and Christian communities were allowed to maintain viticulture, and grapes, a major cash crop of the city, were exported, primarily to Egypt.

Because it bordered the Negev, Gaza was vulnerable to warring nomadic groups. It was destroyed at the end of the Qays–Yaman war (793–796) between two powerful tribes of Arabia. However, by the 10th century, the city had been rebuilt by the Abbasid Caliphate; during Abbasid rule, the geographer al-Maqdisi described Gaza as "a large town lying on the highroad to Egypt on the border of the desert." In 978, the Fatimid Caliphate established an agreement with Alptakin, the Turkic ruler of Damascus, whereby the Fatimids would control Gaza and the land south of it, including Egypt, while Alptakin controlled the region north of the city.

=== Crusader and Ayyubid periods ===
The Crusaders conquered Gaza in 1100 and King Baldwin III built a castle in the city for the Knights Templar in 1149. He also had the Great Mosque converted back into a church, the Cathedral of Saint John. In 1154, Arab traveller al-Idrisi wrote that Gaza "is today very populous and in the hands of the Crusaders." In 1187 the Ayyubids, led by Sultan Saladin, captured Gaza and in 1191 destroyed the city's fortifications. Richard the Lionheart apparently refortified the city in 1192, but the walls were dismantled again as a result of the Treaty of Ramla in 1193. Ayyubid rule ended in 1260, after the Mongols under Hulagu Khan completely destroyed Gaza, which became his southernmost conquest.

=== Mamluk period ===
Following Gaza's destruction by the Mongols, Muslim slave-soldiers based in Egypt known as the Mamluks began to administer the area. In 1277, the Mamluks made Gaza the capital of a province that bore its name, Mamlakat Ghazzah (Governorship of Gaza). This district extended along the coastal plain of Palestine from Rafah in the south to just north of Caesarea, and to the east as far as the Samarian highlands and the Hebron Hills. Other major towns in the province included Qaqun, Ludd, and Ramla. Gaza, which entered a period of tranquility under the Mamluks, was used by them as an outpost in their offensives against the Crusaders which ended in 1290. In 1294 an earthquake devastated Gaza, and five years later the Mongols again destroyed all that had been restored by the Mamluks. Syrian geographer al-Dimashqi described Gaza in 1300 as a "city so rich in trees it looks like a cloth of brocade spread out upon the land." Under the governorship of Emir Sanjar al-Jawli, Gaza was transformed into a flourishing city and much of the Mamluk-era architecture dates back to his reign between 1311 and 1320 and again in 1342. In 1348 the bubonic plague spread to the city, killing the majority of its inhabitants and in 1352, Gaza suffered from a destructive flood, which was rare in that arid part of Palestine. However, when Arab writer Ibn Battuta visited the city in 1355, he noted that it was "large and populous, and has many mosques." The Mamluks contributed to Gazan architecture by building mosques, Islamic colleges, hospitals, caravansaries, and public baths.

The Mamluks allowed Jews to return to the city, after being expelled by the Crusaders, and the Jewish community prospered during Mamluk rule. Towards the end of the Mamluk period, the Jewish community in Gaza was the third largest in Palestine, after the communities in Safad and Jerusalem. In 1481, an Italian Jewish traveller, Meshulam of Volterra, wrote of Gaza:

It is a fine and renowned place, and its fruits are very renowned and good. Bread and good wine is to be found there, but only Jews make wine. Gaza has a circumference of four miles and no walls. It is about six miles from the sea and situated in a valley and on a hill. It has a population as numerous as the sands of the sea, and there are about fifty (sixty) Jewish householders, artisans. They have a small but pretty Synagogue, and vineyards and fields and houses.

=== Ottoman period ===
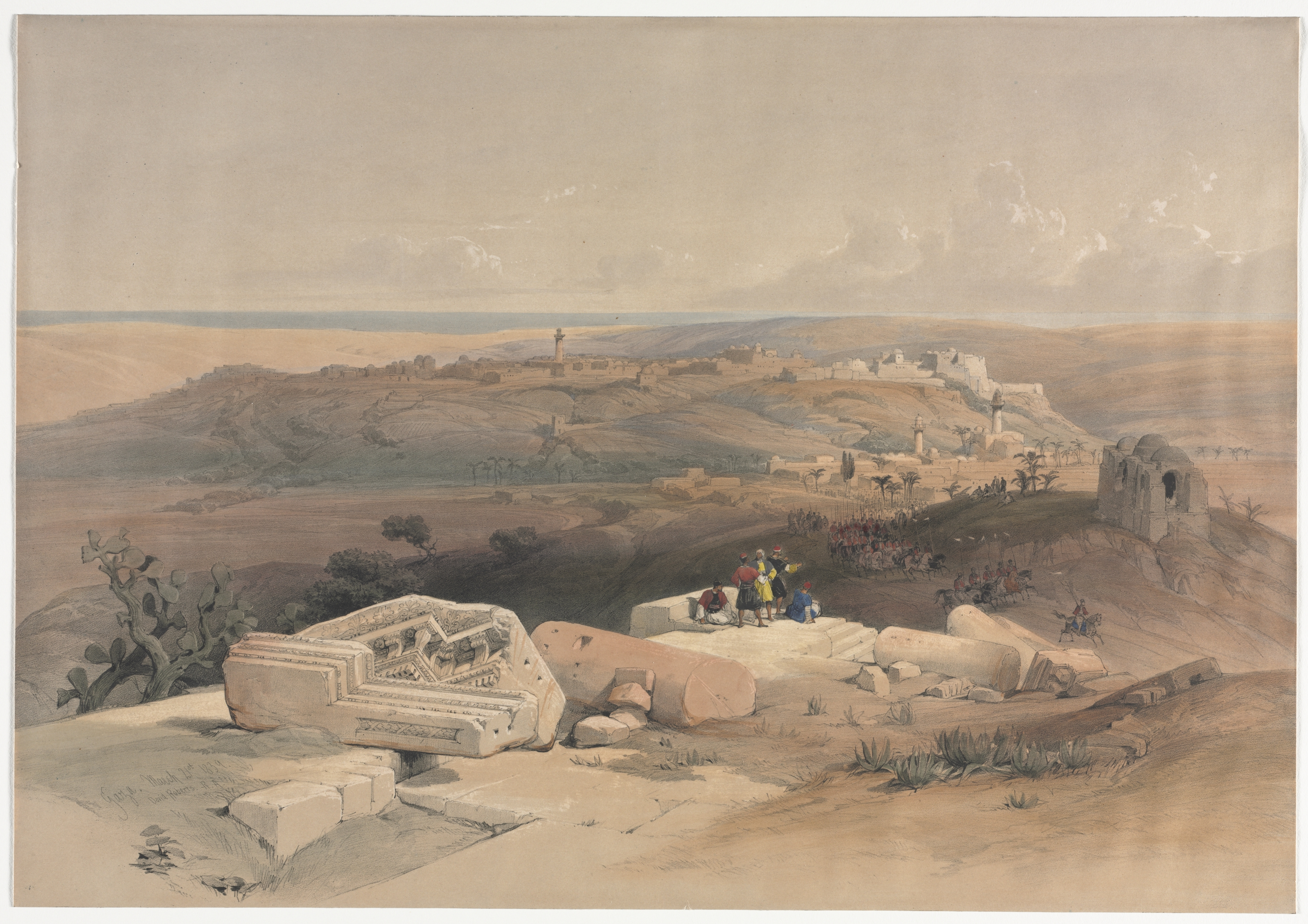
Painting of Gaza by David Roberts, 1839, in The Holy Land, Syria, Idumea, Arabia, Egypt, and Nubia

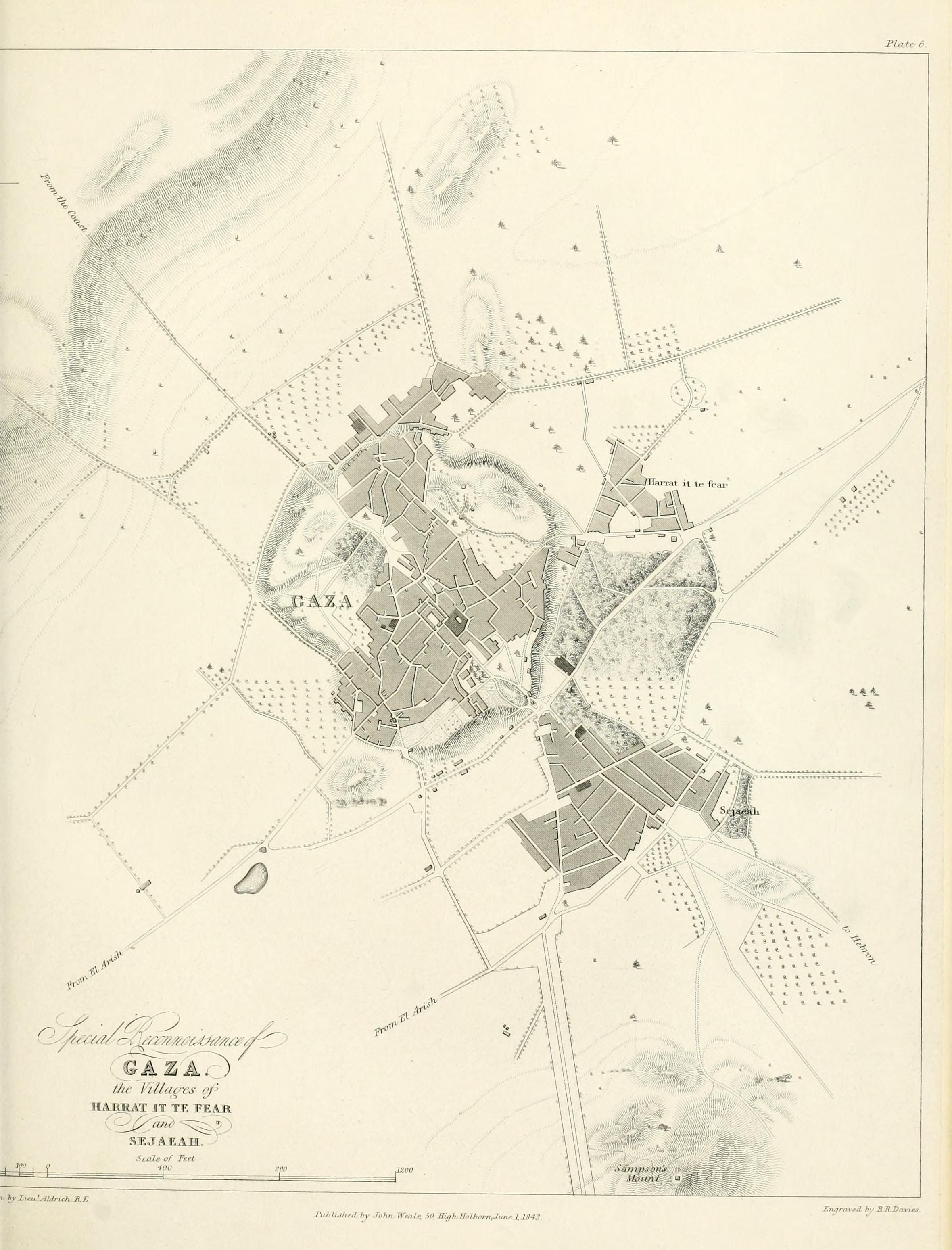
Gaza in 1841, as mapped by the British Royal Engineers after the Oriental Crisis of 1840

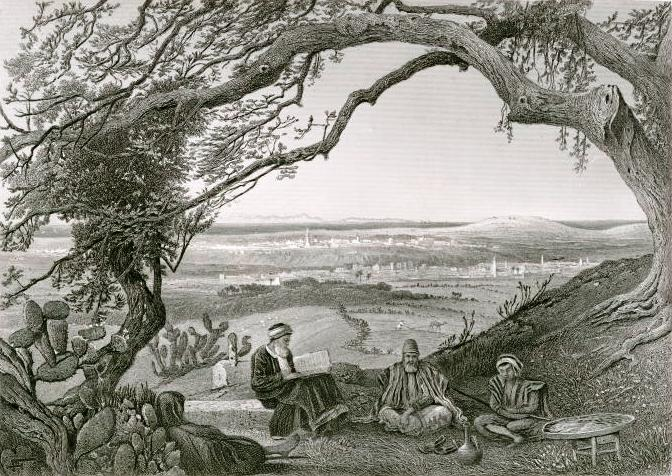
Muslims studying the Qur'an with Gaza in the background, painting by Harry Fenn, circa 1884

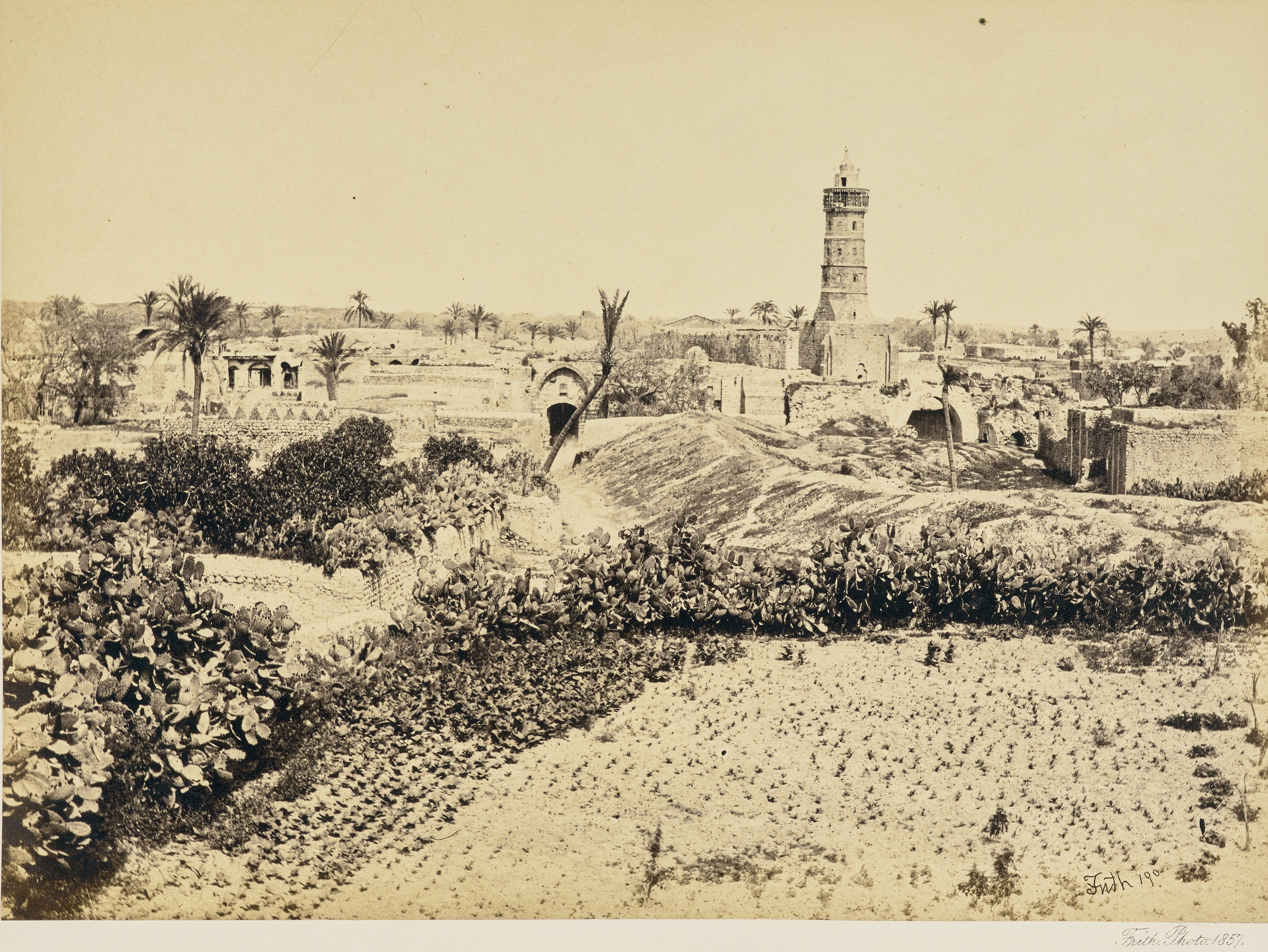
The Old Town, Gaza (1862–1863). Picture by Frances Frith

In 1516 Gaza—at the time, a small town with an inactive port, ruined buildings and reduced trade—was incorporated into the Ottoman Empire. The Ottoman army quickly and efficiently crushed a small-scale uprising, and the local population generally welcomed them as fellow Sunni Muslims. The city was then made the capital of the Gaza Sanjak, part of the larger Province of Damascus. The Ridwan family, named after governor Ridwan Pasha, was the first dynasty to govern Gaza and would continue to rule the city for over a century. Under Ahmad ibn Ridwan, the city became a cultural and religious center as a result of the partnership between the governor and prominent Islamic jurist Khayr al-Din al-Ramli, who was based in the nearby town of al-Ramla.

According to Theodore E. Dowling, writing in 1913, a Samaritan community existed in Gaza in 1584. They possessed a large synagogue and two bathhouses. "One of them still bears the name "the Bath of the Samaritans." It is believed the Samaritans were expelled from the city before the turn of the 16th century.

During the rule of Husayn Pasha, strife between the settled population and the nearby Bedouin tribes was dramatically reduced, allowing Gaza to peacefully prosper. The Ridwan period is described as a golden age for Gaza, a time when it served as the virtual "capital of Palestine." The Great Mosque was restored, and six other mosques constructed, while hammams and market stalls proliferated. After the death of Musa Pasha, Husayn's successor, Ottoman officials were appointed to govern in place of the Ridwans. The Ridwan period was Gaza's last golden age during Ottoman rule. After the family was removed from office, the city gradually declined.

Starting in the early 19th century, Gaza was culturally dominated by neighboring Egypt; Muhammad Ali of Egypt conquered Gaza in 1832. American scholar Edward Robinson visited the city in 1838, describing it as a "thickly populated" town larger than Jerusalem, with its Old City lying upon a hilltop, while its suburbs laid on the nearby plain. The city benefited from trade and commerce because of its strategic position on the caravan route between Egypt and northern Syria as well as from producing soap and cotton for trade with the government, local Arab tribes, and the Bedouin of Wadi Arabah and Ma'an. The bazaars of Gaza were well-supplied and were noted by Robinson as "far better" than those of Jerusalem. Robinson noted that virtually all of Gaza's vestiges of ancient history and antiquity had disappeared due to constant conflict and occupation. By the mid-19th century, Gaza's port was eclipsed by the ports of Jaffa and Haifa, but it retained its fishing fleet.

The bubonic plague struck Gaza again in 1839 and the city, lacking political and economic stability, went into a state of stagnation. In 1840 Egyptian and Ottoman troops battled outside of Gaza. The Ottomans won control of the territory, effectively ending Egyptian rule over Palestine. However, the battles brought about more death and destruction in Gaza.

During the late Ottoman period, British ships docking in Gaza were loaded with barley, which was primarily intended for marketing in Scotland for whisky production. Due to the absence of a British consular agent, precise data on the financial value and quantities of the goods are unavailable.

=== Stages of conflict and occupation ===
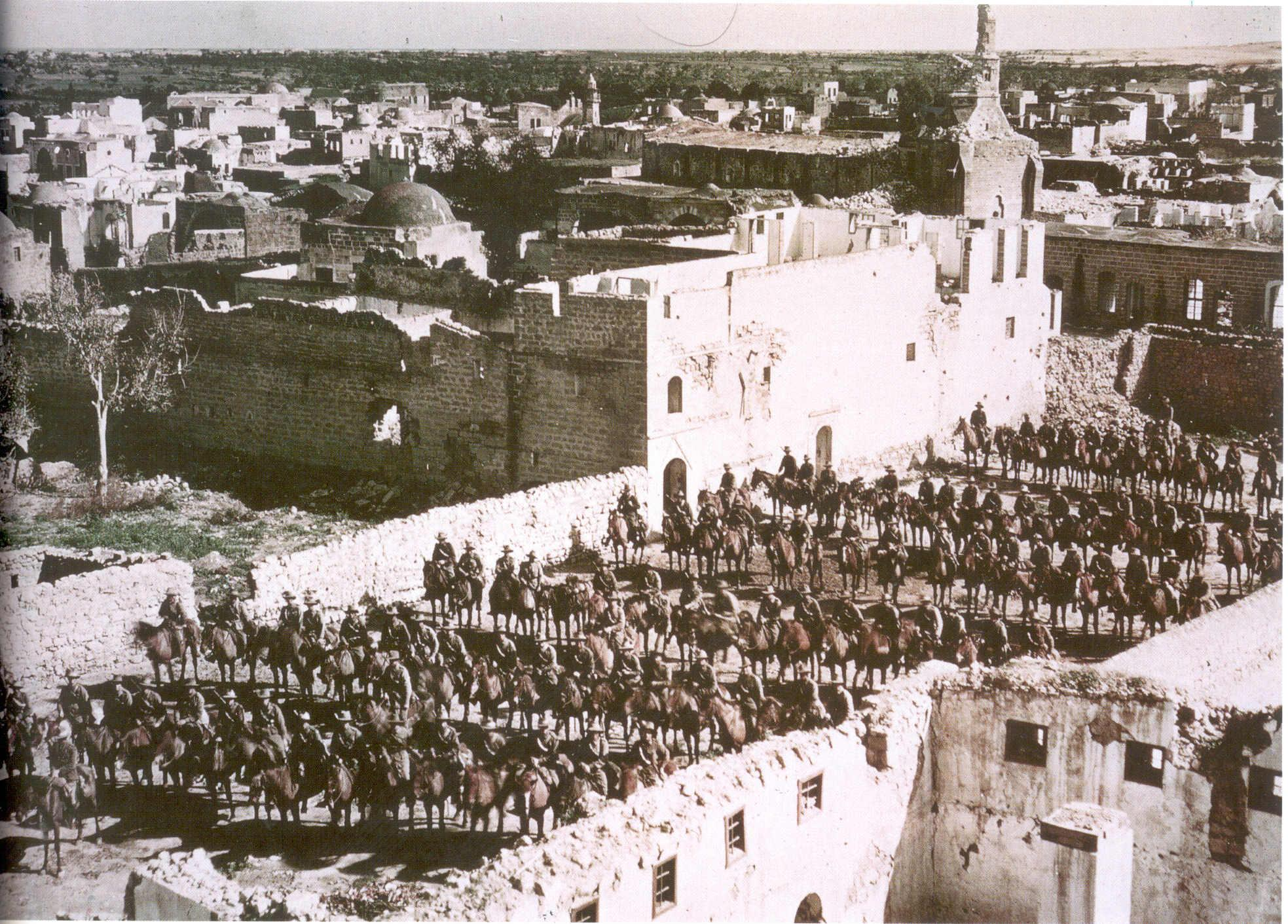
Gaza after surrender to British forces, 1918

While leading the Allied Forces during World War I, the British won control of the city during the Third Battle of Gaza in 1917. After the war, Gaza was included in Mandatory Palestine. In the 1930s and 1940s, Gaza underwent major expansion. New neighborhoods were built along the coast and the southern and eastern plains. International organizations and missionary groups funded most of this construction.

In the 1947 United Nations Partition Plan, Gaza was assigned to be part of an Arab state in Palestine but was occupied by Egypt following the 1948 Arab–Israeli War. Gaza's growing population was augmented by an influx of refugees from nearby cities, towns and villages that were captured by Israel. In 1957, Egyptian president Gamal Abdel Nasser made a number of reforms in Gaza, which included expanding educational opportunities and the civil services, providing housing, and establishing local security forces.

=== Israeli occupation and colonisation ===
Gaza was occupied by Israel during the 1967 Six-Day War following the defeat of the Egyptian Army. Frequent conflicts have erupted between Palestinians and the Israeli authorities in the city since the 1970s. The tensions led to the First Intifada in 1987. Gaza was a center of confrontation during this uprising, and economic conditions in the city worsened.

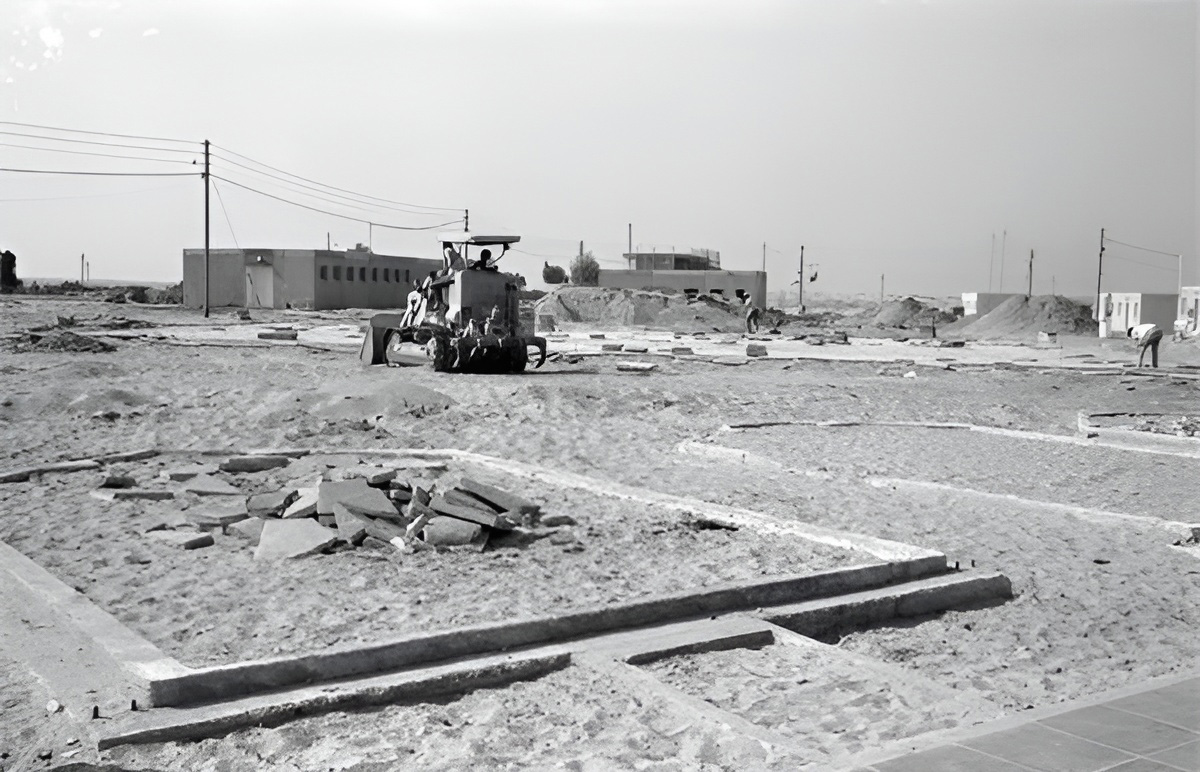
Construction by the Nahal of the Israeli settlement of Netzarim, in the south Gaza-city, November 1972.

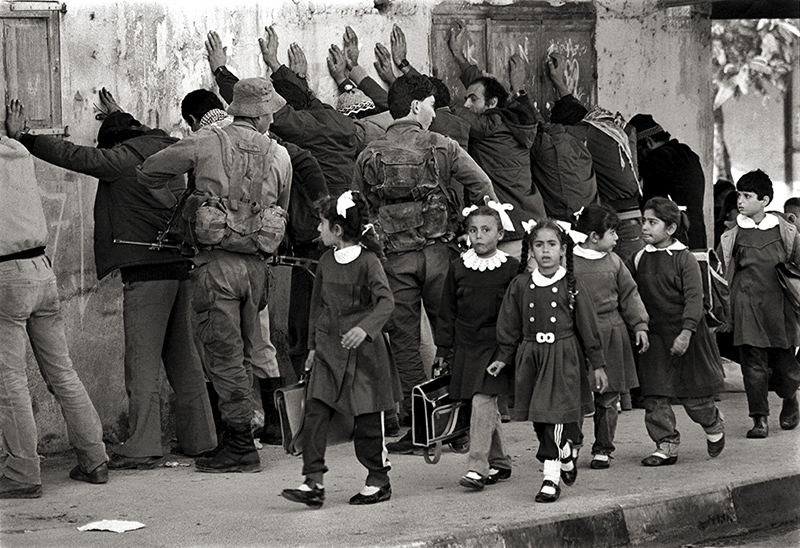
Palestinian schoolgirls returning home come across Israeli soldiers frisking a group of Palestinian men, November 1986

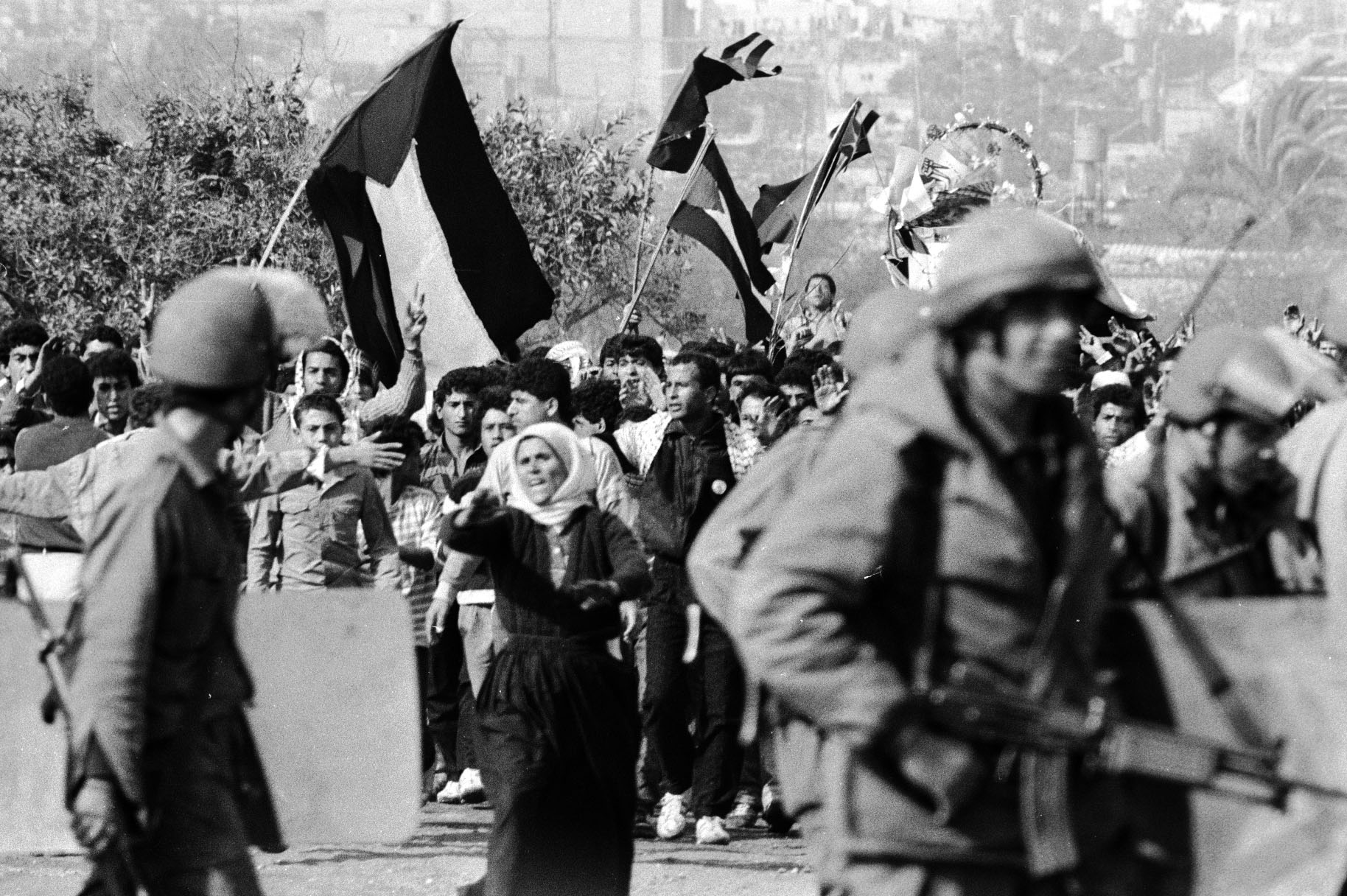
Palestinian demonstration during First Intifada in Gaza Strip, 21 December 1987

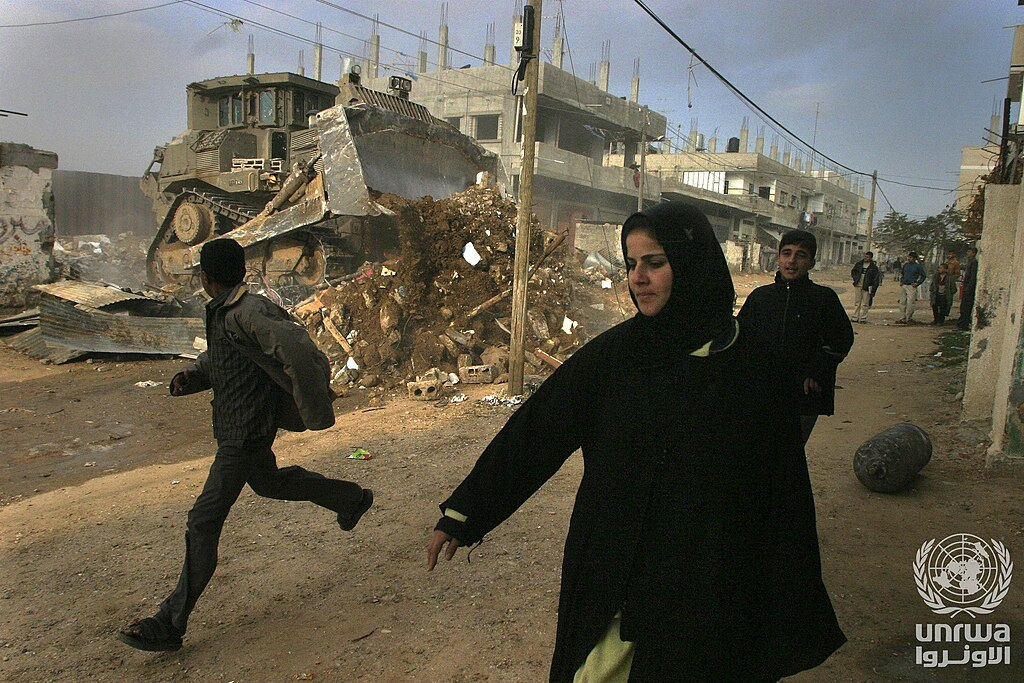
Armed Israeli bulldozer destroying a Palestinian home in Gaza during the Second Intifada, 2001

=== Palestinian control ===
In September 1993, the leaders of Israel and the Palestine Liberation Organization (PLO) signed the Oslo Accords. The agreement called for Palestinian administration of the Gaza Strip and the West Bank town of Jericho, which was implemented in May 1994. Israeli forces withdrew from Gaza, leaving a new Palestinian National Authority (PNA) to administer and police the city. The PNA, led by Yasser Arafat, chose Gaza as its first provincial headquarters. The newly established Palestinian National Council held its inaugural session in Gaza in March 1996.

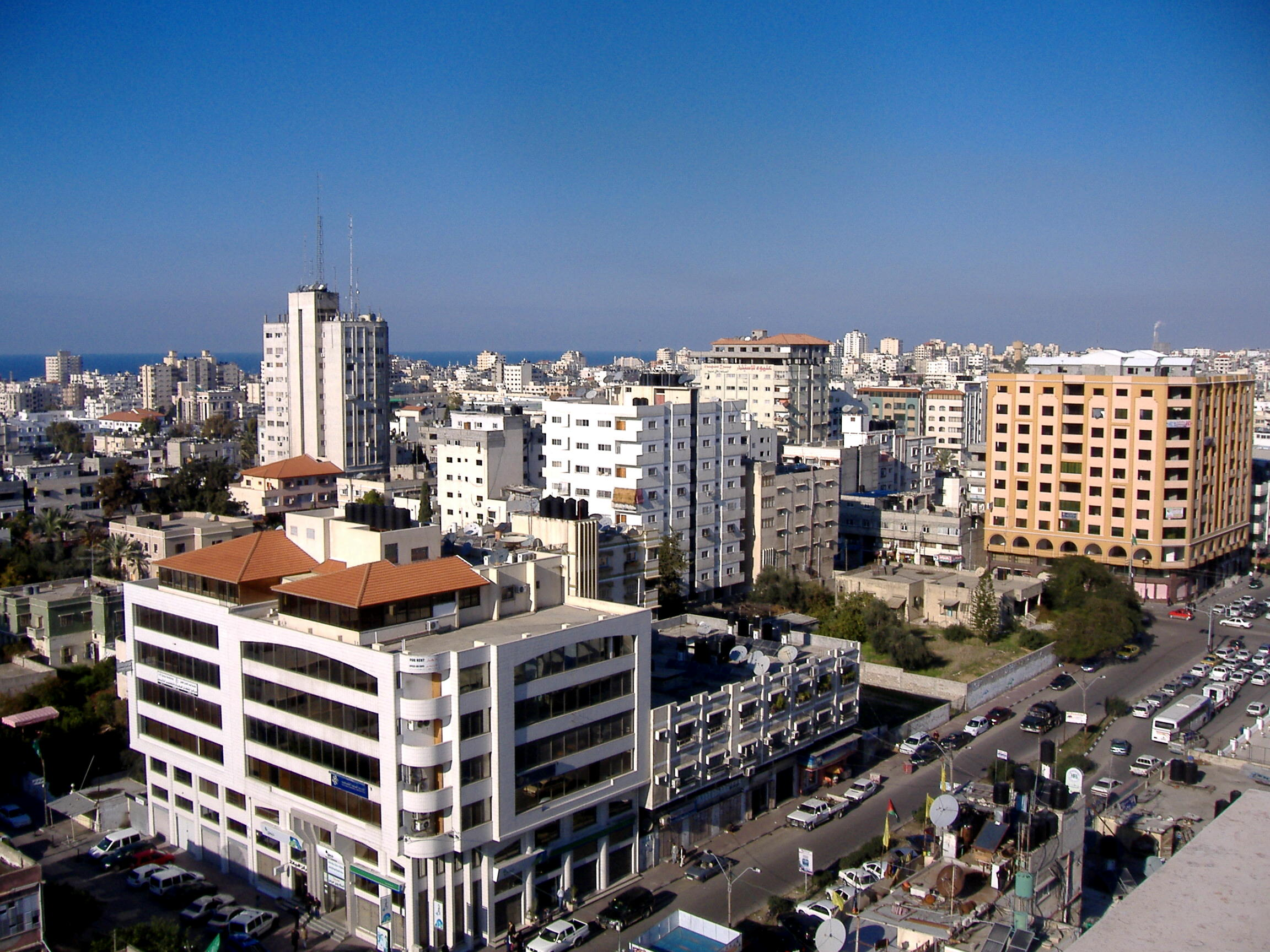
Gaza City in 2007

In 2005, Israel withdrew its troops from the Gaza Strip and removed the thousands of Israelis who had settled in the territory. (See Israel's unilateral disengagement plan of 2004.) Since the Israeli withdrawal, Hamas has been engaged in a sometimes violent power struggle with its rival Palestinian organisation Fatah. On 25 January 2006, Hamas won a surprise victory in the elections for the Palestinian Legislative Council, the legislature of the Palestinian National Authority. In 2007, Hamas overthrew Fatah forces in the Gaza Strip and Hamas members were dismissed from the PNA government in the West Bank in response. Hamas, recognized as a terror organization by most western countries, has de facto control of the city and Strip.

In March 2008, a coalition of human rights groups charged that the Israeli blockade of the city had caused the humanitarian situation in Gaza to have reached its worst point since Israel occupied the territory in the 1967 Six-Day War, and that Israeli air strikes targeting militants in the densely populated areas have often killed bystanders as well. In 2008, Israel commenced an assault against Gaza. Israel stated the strikes were in response to repetitive rocket and mortar attacks from the Gaza Strip into Israel since 2005, while the Palestinians stated that they were responding to Israel's military incursions and blockade of the Gaza Strip. In January 2009, at least 1,300 Palestinians were killed in the conflict.

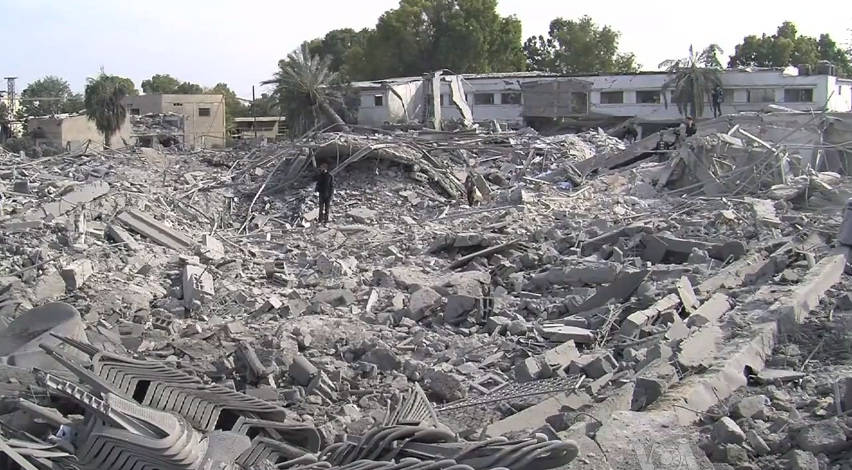
Destruction in Gaza-city after Israeli bombardment, 22 November 2012

In November 2012, after a week of conflict between Israel and Palestinian militant groups, a ceasefire brokered by Egypt was announced on 21 November. In the 2014 Israel–Gaza conflict, 2,205 Palestinians (including at least 1,483 civilians) and 71 Israelis (including 66 soldiers) and one foreign national in Israel were killed, according to UN OCHA. During the 2021 Israel–Palestine crisis, the 13-story Hanadi Tower, which contained a political office of Hamas, was destroyed by an Israeli airstrike.

=== Gaza War ===
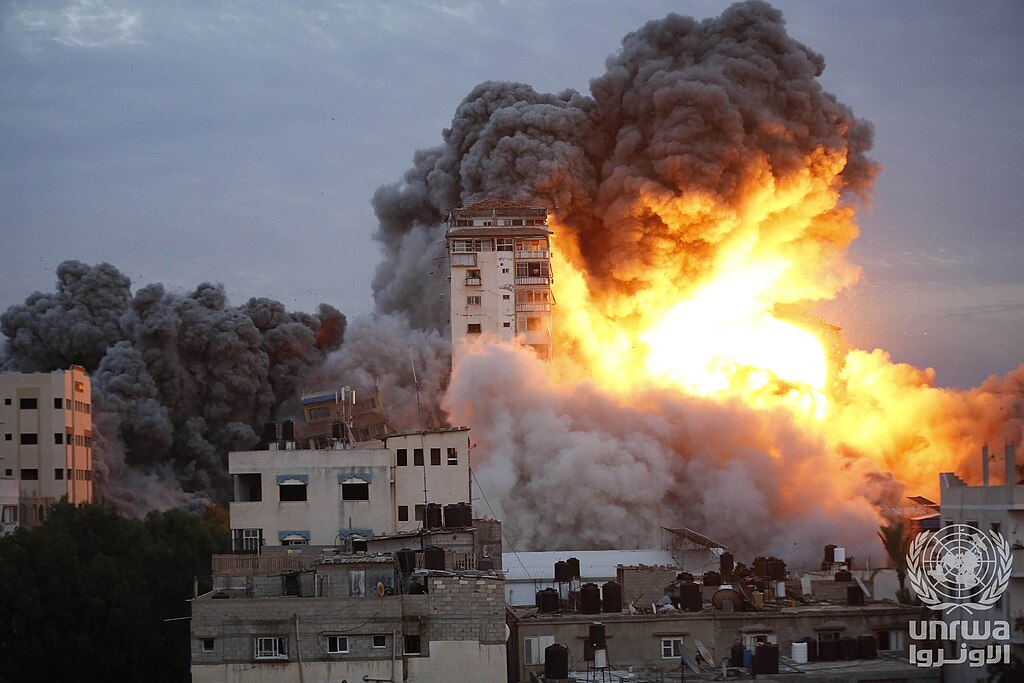
Residential tower in Gaza destroyed by Israeli bombardment on the morning of 8 October 2023

In 2023, the city was again targeted during the Gaza war. On 2 November, the siege of Gaza City started. As of January 2024, Israel’s offensive has either damaged or destroyed 70–80% of all buildings in northern Gaza. Gaza was left largely deserted, with about only 300,000 people staying in the city. The remaining population was subjected to a humanitarian crisis and starvation brought on by the war.

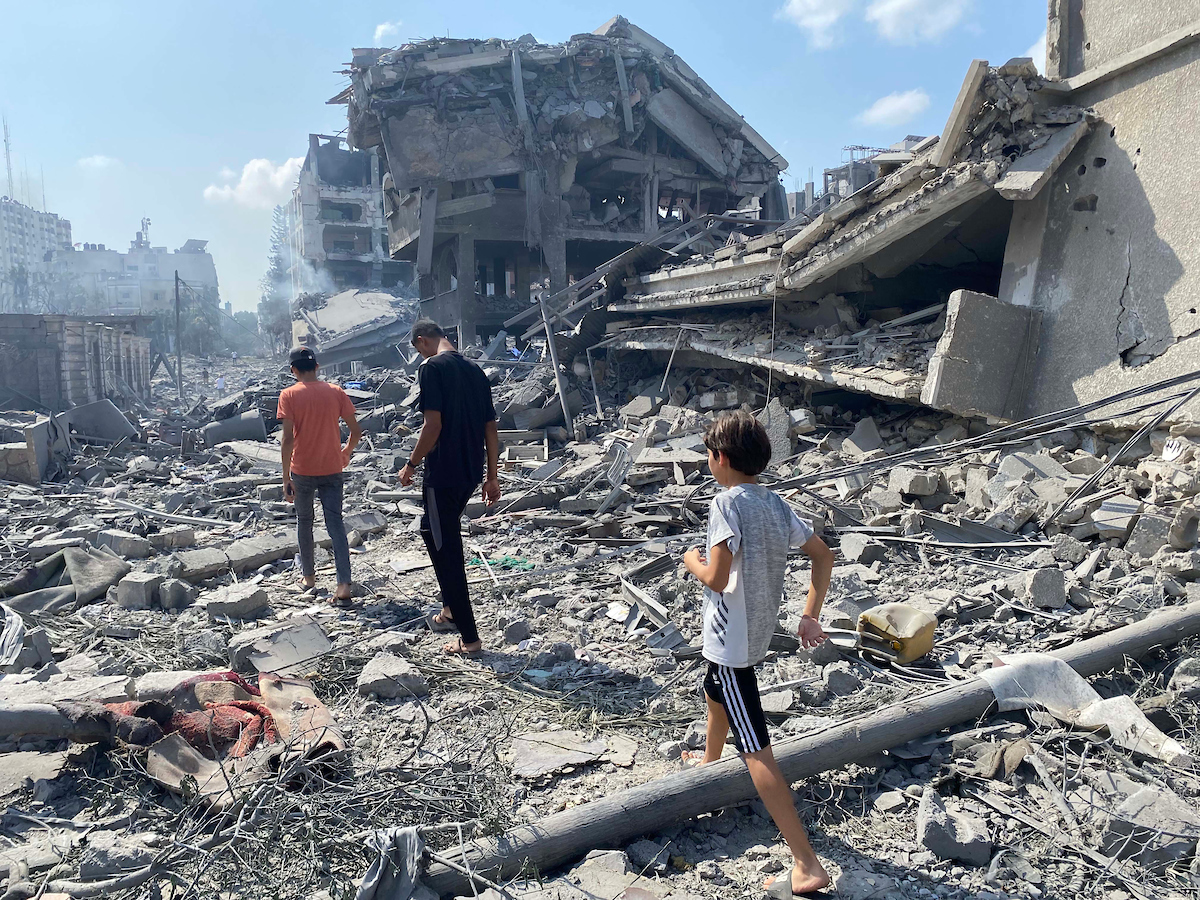
Rimal district in Gaza City on 9 October 2023

Seventy percent of the city was destroyed by airstrikes, and at least 64,964 people were killed in the Strip. Israel has been accused of committing a genocide of Palestinians in Gaza during the war, with South Africa initiating proceedings at the International Court of Justice against Israel.

== Geography ==
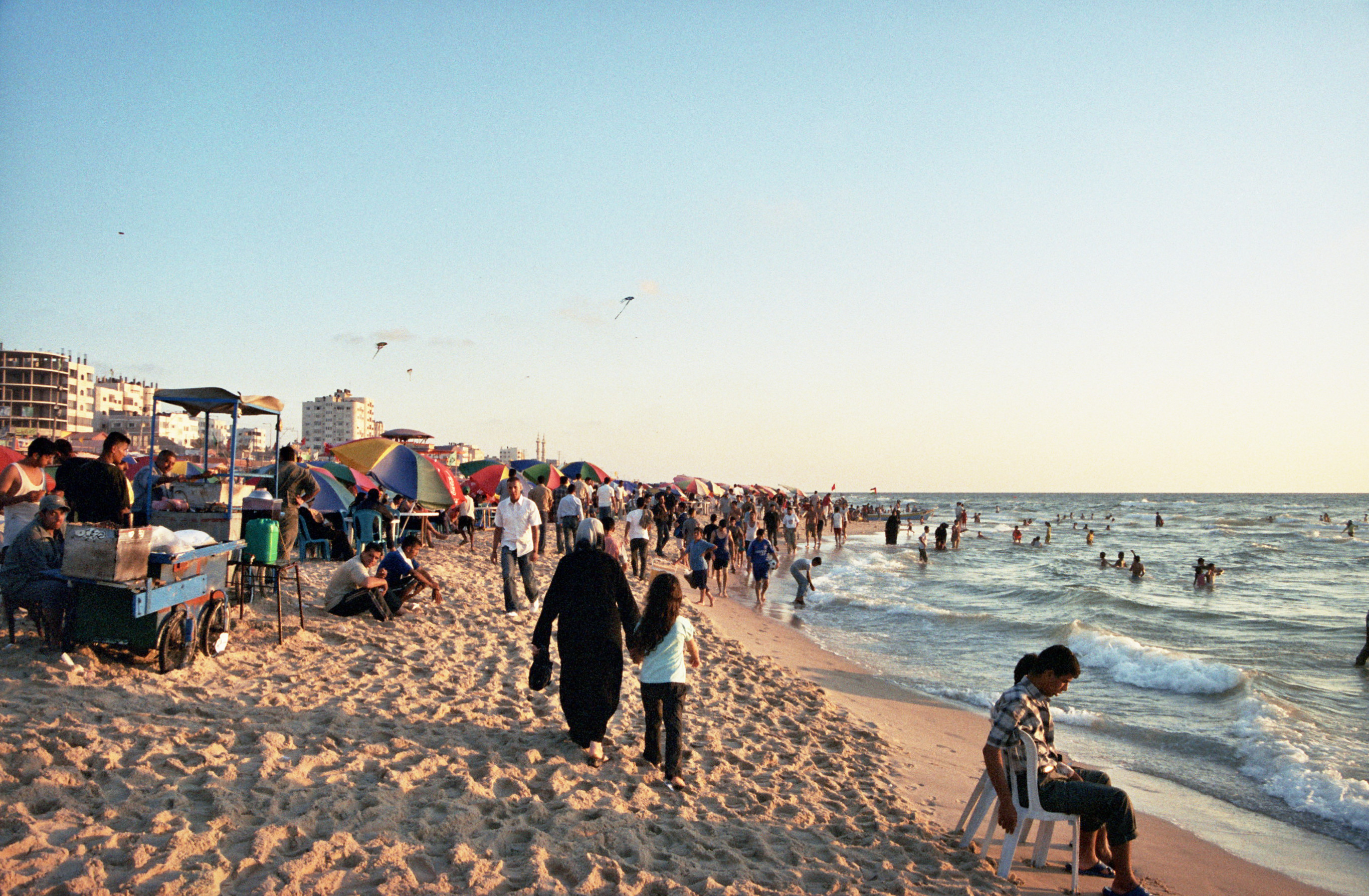
Beach in Gaza City in 2006

Central Gaza is situated on a low-lying and round hill with an elevation of 14 metres (46 ft) above sea level. Much of the modern city is built along the plain below the hill, especially to the north and east, forming Gaza's suburbs. The beach and the port of Gaza are located 3 kilometres (1.9 mi) west of the city's nucleus and the space in between is entirely built up on low-lying hills.

The municipal jurisdiction of the city today constitutes about 45 square kilometres (17 sq mi). Gaza is 78 kilometres (48 mi) southwest of Jerusalem, 71 kilometres (44 mi) south of Tel Aviv, and 30 kilometres (19 mi) north of Rafah. Surrounding localities include Beit Lahia, Beit Hanoun, and Jabalia to the north, and the village of Abu Middein, the refugee camp of Bureij, and the city of Deir al-Balah to the south.

The population of Gaza depends on groundwater as the only source for drinking, agricultural use, and domestic supply. The nearest stream is Wadi Ghazza to the south, sourced from Abu Middein along the coastline. It bears a small amount of water during the winter and virtually no water during the summer. Most of its water supply is diverted into Israel. The Gaza Aquifer along the coast is the main aquifer in the Gaza Strip and it consists mostly of Pleistocene sandstones. Like most of the Gaza Strip, Gaza is covered by quaternary soil; clay minerals in the soil absorb many organic and inorganic chemicals which has partially alleviated the extent of groundwater contamination.

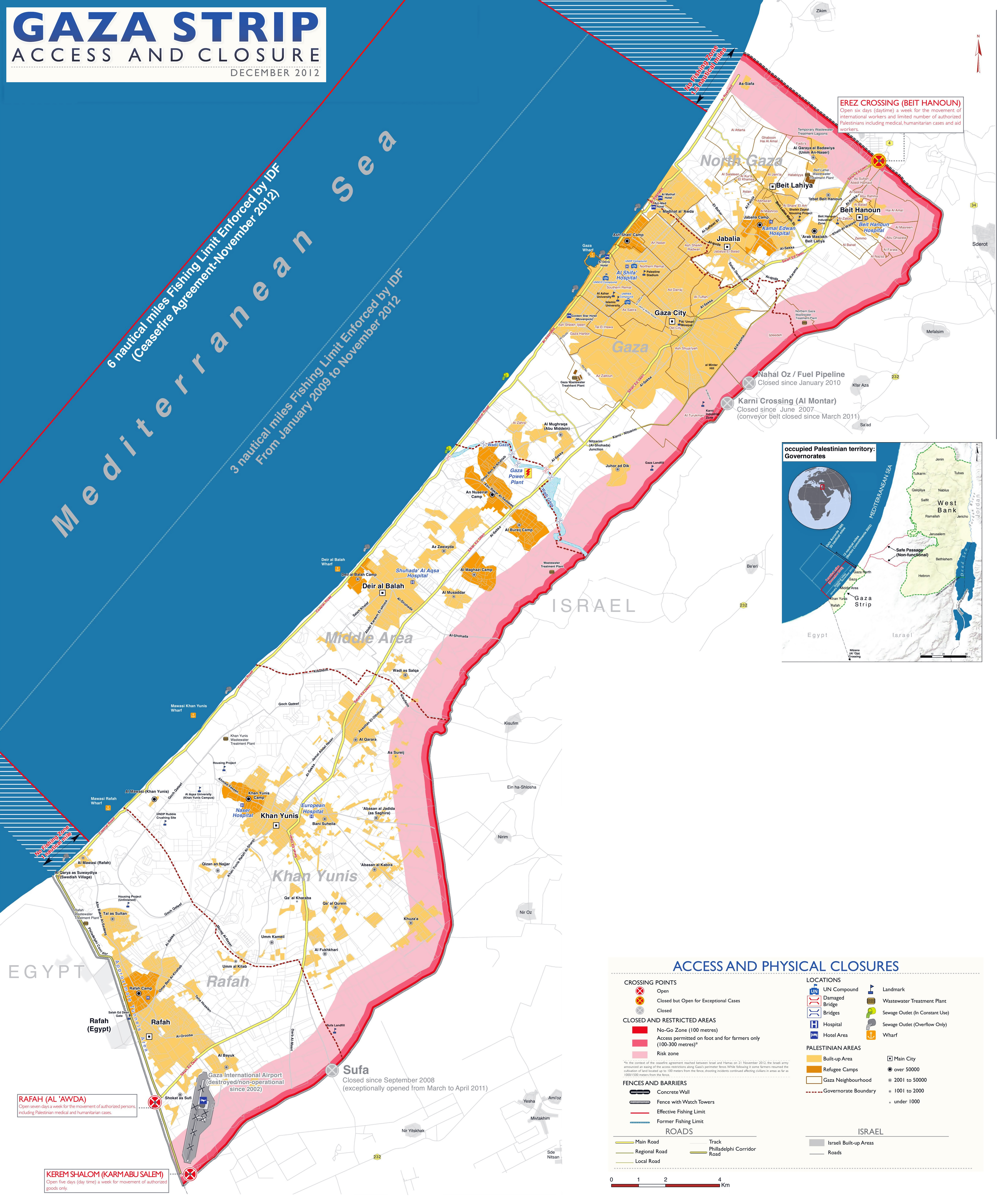
Gaza Strip with Israeli-controlled borders and limited fishing zone, as of December 2012

A prominent hill southeast of Gaza, known as Tell al-Muntar, has an elevation of 270 feet (82 m) above sea level. For centuries it has been claimed as the place to which Samson brought the city gates of the Philistines. The hill is crowned by a Muslim shrine (maqam) dedicated to Ali al-Muntar. There are old Muslim graves around the surrounding trees, and the lintel of the doorway of the maqam has two medieval Arabic scriptures.

=== Old City ===
The Old City forms the main part of Gaza's nucleus. It is roughly divided into two quarters; the northern Daraj Quarter (also known as the Muslim Quarter) and the southern Zaytun Quarter (which contained the Jewish and Christian quarters.) Most structures date from the Mamluk and Ottoman eras, and some were built on top of earlier structures. The ancient part of the Old City is about 1.6 square kilometres (0.62 sq mi).

There were seven historic gates to the Old City: Bab Asqalan (Gate of Ascalon), Bab al-Darum (Gate of Deir al-Balah), Bab al-Bahr (Gate of the Sea), Bab Marnas (Gate of Marnas), Bab al-Baladiyah (Gate of the Town), Bab al-Khalil (Gate of Hebron), and Bab al-Muntar (Gate of Tell al-Muntar).

Some of the older buildings in Gaza's Old City use the ablaq style of decoration, which features alternating layers of red and white masonry, prevalent in the Mamluk era. Daraj contains the Gold (Qissariya) Market as well as the Great Mosque of Gaza (oldest mosque in Gaza) and the Sayed al-Hashim Mosque. In Zaytun lies the Saint Porphryrius Church, the Katib al-Wilaya Mosque, and Hamam as-Sammara ("the Samaritan's Bathhouse").

=== Districts ===
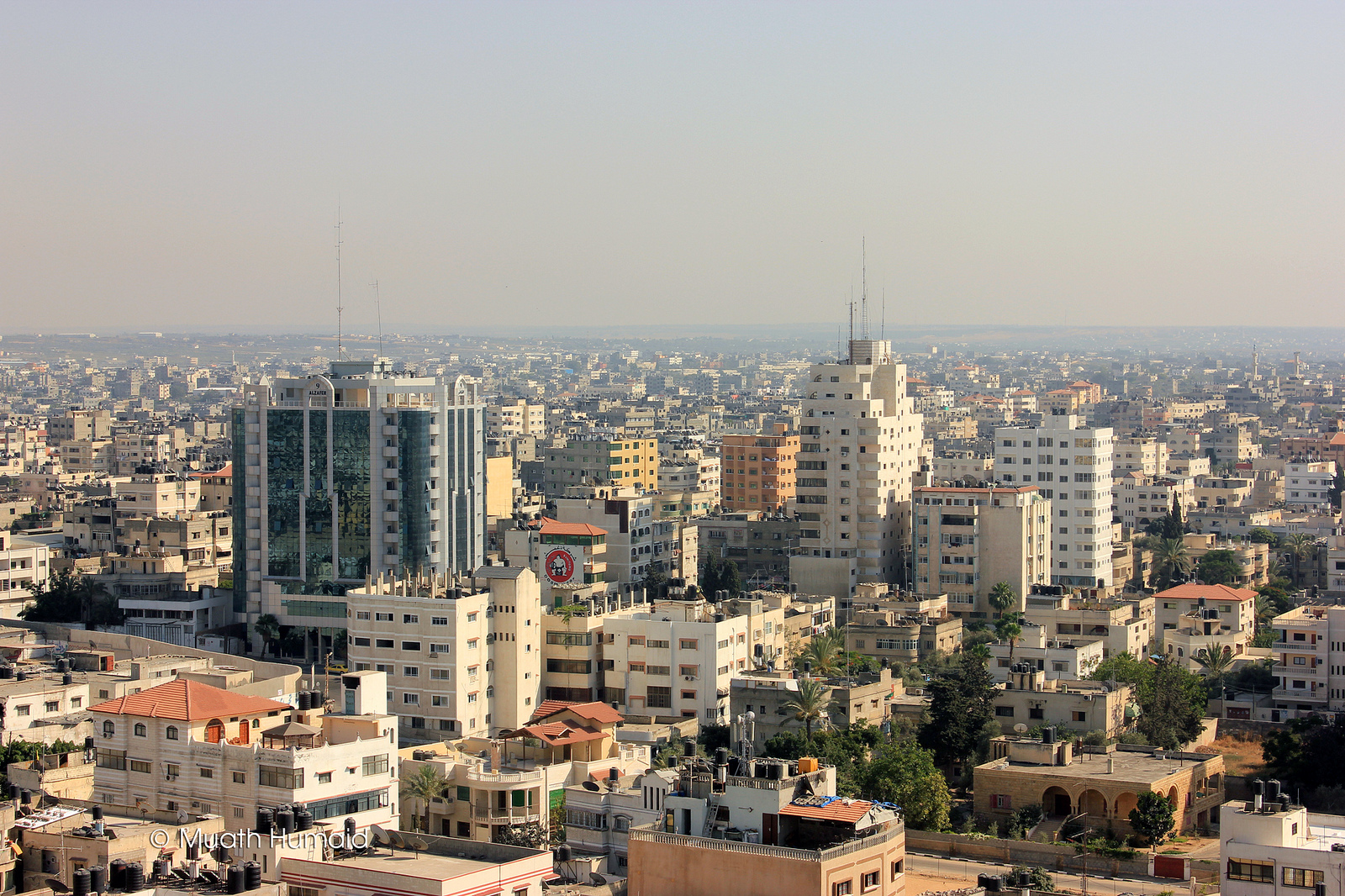
Eastern Gaza City in 2013

Gaza is composed of thirteen districts (hayy) outside of the Old City. The first extension of Gaza beyond its city center was the district of Shuja'iyya, built on a hill just east and southeast of the Old City during the Ayyubid period. In the northeast is the Mamluk-era district of Tuffah, which is roughly divided into eastern and western halves and was originally located within the Old City's walls.

During the 1930s and 1940s, a new residential district, Rimal (currently divided into the districts of Northern Rimal and Southern Rimal), was constructed on the sand dunes west of the city center, and the district of Zeitoun was built along Gaza's southern and southwestern borders, while the Judeide ("the New") and Turukman neighborhoods of Shuja'iyya expanded into separate districts in the northeast and southeast, respectively. Judeide (also known Shuja'iyyat al-Akrad) was named after the Kurdish military units who settled there during the Mamluk era, while Turukman was named after the Turkmen military units who settled there.

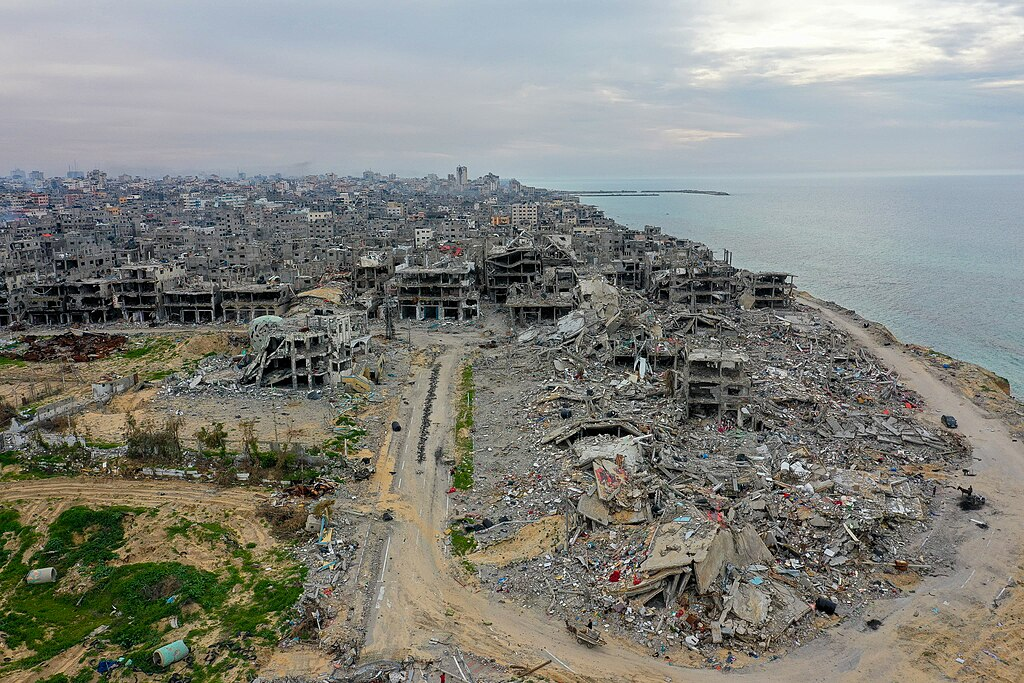
Aerial view of the Al-Shati refugee camp, 3 July 2024, with significant damage caused by Israeli airstrikes.

The areas between Rimal and the Old City became the districts of Sabra and Daraj. In the northwest is the district of Nasser, built in the early 1950s and named in honor of Egyptian president Gamal Abdel Nasser. The district of Sheikh Radwan, developed in the 1970s, is 3 kilometres (1.9 mi) to the north of the Old City and is named after Sheikh Radwan—the tomb of whom is located within the district. Gaza has absorbed the village of al-Qubbah near the border with Israel, as well as the Palestinian refugee camp of al-Shati along the coast, although the latter is not under the city's municipal jurisdiction. In the late 1990s, the PNA built the more affluent neighborhood of Tel al-Hawa along the southern edge of Rimal. Along the southern coast of the city is the neighborhood of Sheikh Ijlin.

=== Climate ===
Gaza has a hot semi-arid climate (Köppen: BSh), with Mediterranean characteristics, featuring mild, rainy winters and hot, humid summers (despite very little precipitation). Spring arrives around March or April and the hottest month is August, with the average high being 31.7 °C (89.1 °F). The coolest month is January with temperatures usually peaking at 18.3 °C (64.9 °F). Rain is scarce and falls almost exclusively between November and March, with annual rainfall totalling approximately 395 millimetres or 15.6 inches.

Climate data for Gaza
Month	Jan	Feb	Mar	Apr	May	Jun	Jul	Aug	Sep	Oct	Nov	Dec	Year
Mean daily maximum °C (°F)	18.3 (64.9)	18.9 (66.0)	21.1 (70.0)	24.4 (75.9)	27.2 (81.0)	29.4 (84.9)	30.6 (87.1)	31.7 (89.1)	30.6 (87.1)	28.9 (84.0)	25.0 (77.0)	20.6 (69.1)	25.6 (78.1)
Daily mean °C (°F)	13.9 (57.0)	14.5 (58.1)	16.4 (61.5)	19.1 (66.4)	21.8 (71.2)	24.5 (76.1)	26.0 (78.8)	27.0 (80.6)	25.6 (78.1)	23.3 (73.9)	19.8 (67.6)	16.1 (61.0)	20.7 (69.2)
Mean daily minimum °C (°F)	9.4 (48.9)	10.0 (50.0)	11.6 (52.9)	13.8 (56.8)	16.4 (61.5)	19.5 (67.1)	21.4 (70.5)	22.2 (72.0)	20.5 (68.9)	17.7 (63.9)	14.5 (58.1)	11.6 (52.9)	15.7 (60.3)
Average rainfall mm (inches)	104 (4.1)	76 (3.0)	30 (1.2)	13 (0.5)	3 (0.1)	1 (0.0)	0 (0)	1 (0.0)	3 (0.1)	18 (0.7)	64 (2.5)	81 (3.2)	394 (15.4)
Average relative humidity (%)	85	84	83	82	84	87	86	87	86	74	78	81	83
Mean monthly sunshine hours	204.6	192.1	241.8	264.0	331.7	339.0	353.4	337.9	306.0	275.9	237.0	204.6	3,288
Mean daily sunshine hours	6.6	6.8	7.8	8.8	10.7	11.3	11.4	10.9	10.2	8.9	7.9	6.6	9.1
Source: Arab Meteorology Book

== Demographics ==
=== Population ===
Year	Population
1596	6,000
1838	15,000–16,000
1882	16,000
1897	36,000
1906	40,000
1914	42,000
1922	17,480
1931	17,046
1945	34,250
1982	100,272
1997	306,113
2007	449,221
2012	590,481

According to Ottoman tax records in 1557, Gaza had 2,477 male taxpayers. The statistics from 1596 show that Gaza's Muslim population consisted of 456 households, 115 bachelors, 59 religious persons, and 19 disabled persons. In addition to the Muslim figure, there were 141 jundiyan or "soldiers" in the Ottoman army. Of the Christians, there were 294 households and seven bachelors, while there were 73 Jewish households and eight Samaritan households. In total, an estimated 6,000 people lived in Gaza, making it the third largest city in Ottoman Palestine after Jerusalem and Safad.

In 1838, there were roughly 4,000 Muslim and 100 Christian tax payers, implying a population of about 15,000 or 16,000—making it larger than Jerusalem at the time. The total number of Christian families was 57. Before the outbreak of World War I, the population of Gaza had reached 42,000; however, the fierce battles between Allied Forces and the Ottomans and their German allies in 1917 in Gaza resulted in a massive population decrease. The following census, which was conducted in 1922 by the British Mandate authorities shows a sharp decrease in population which stood at 17,480 residents (16,722 Muslims, 701 Christians, 54 Jews and three Metawilehs). The 1931 census lists 17,046 inhabitants (16,356 Muslims, 689 Christians, and one Jew) and another 4,597 in the suburbs (4,561 Muslims and 36 Christians).

The village statistics of 1938 list Gaza's population as 20,500 with 5,282 in nearby suburbs. The village statistics of 1945 list the population as 34,250 (33,160 Muslims, 1,010 Christians, and 80 Jews).

According to a 1997 census by the Palestinian Central Bureau of Statistics (PCBS), Gaza and the adjacent al-Shati camp had a population of 353,115, of which 50.9% were males and 49.1% females. Gaza had an overwhelmingly young population with more than half being 19 and under (60.8%). About 28.8% were between the ages of 20 and 44, 7.7% between 45 and 64, and 3.9% were over the age of 64.

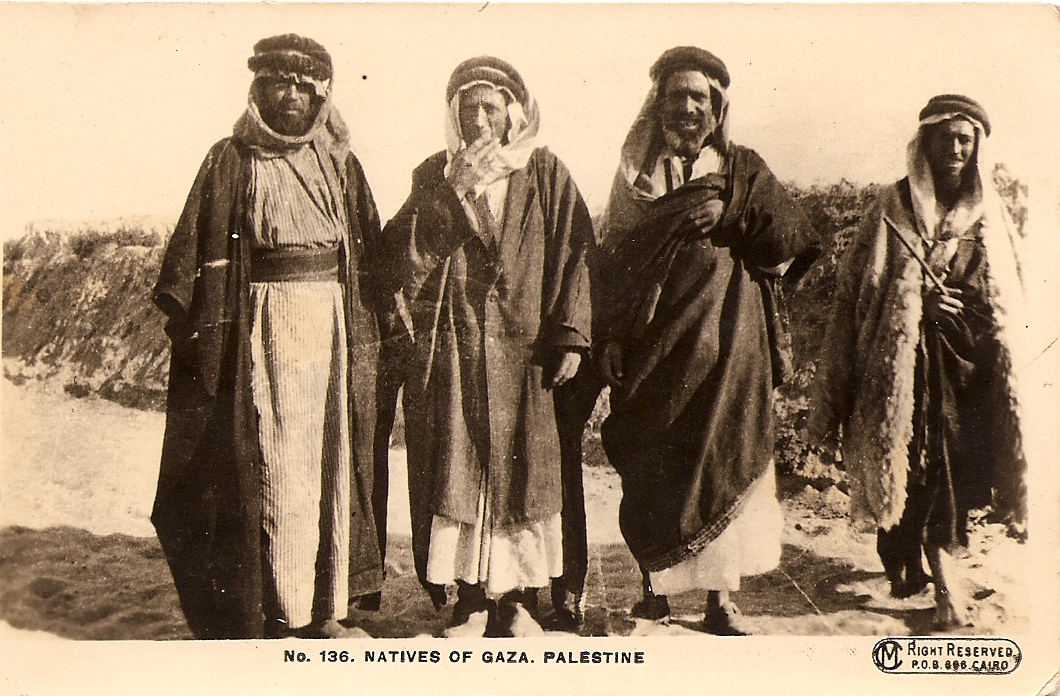
Men from Gaza, 19th century

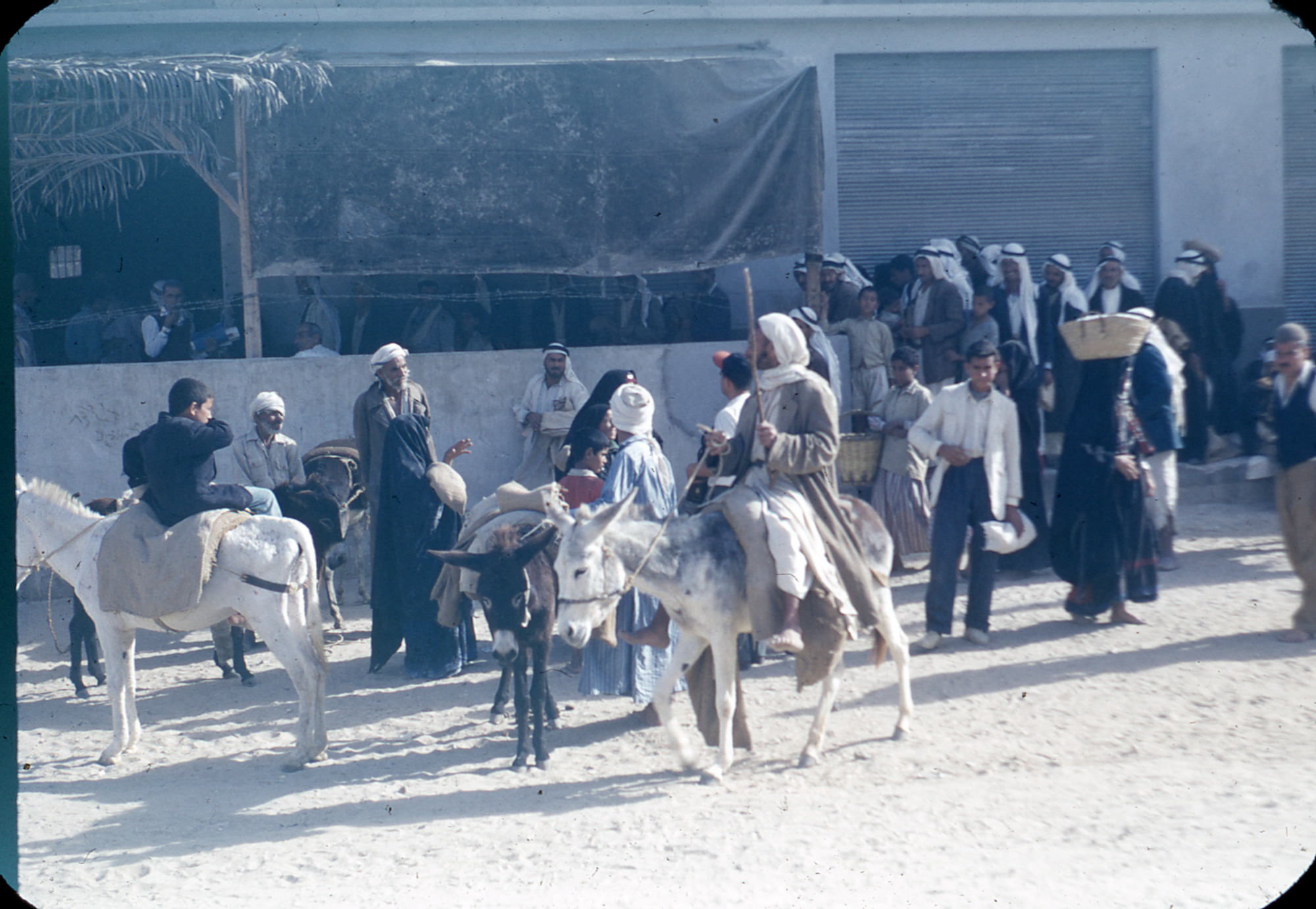
People in Gaza City in 1956

A massive influx of Palestinian refugees swelled Gaza's population after the 1948 Arab–Israeli War. By 1967, the population had grown to about six times its 1948 size. In 1997, 51.8% of Gaza's inhabitants were refugees or their descendants. The city's population has continued to increase since that time to 590,481 in 2017, making it the largest city in the Palestinian territories. Gaza City has one of the highest overall growth rates in the world. Its population density is 9,982.69/km^{2} (26,424.76/sq mi) comparable to New York City (10,725.4/km^{2} – 27,778.7/sq mi), half of Paris density (21,000/km^{2} – 55,000/sq mi). In 2007 poverty, unemployment and poor living conditions were widespread and many residents received United Nations food aid.

=== Religion ===
The population of Gaza is overwhelmingly composed of Muslims, who mostly follow Sunni Islam. During the Fatimid period, Shia Islam was dominant in Gaza, but after Saladin conquered the city in 1187, he promoted a strictly Sunni religious and educational policy, which at the time was instrumental in uniting his Arab and Turkish soldiers.

In 1906, there were about 750 Christians, of which 700 were Orthodox and 50 were Roman Catholic. Gaza remains home to a small Palestinian Christian minority of about 3,500 people. The majority live in the Zaytun Quarter of the Old City and belong to the Greek Orthodox, Roman Catholic, and Baptist denominations. The Latin or Roman Catholic parish church there is dedicated to the Holy Family.

Gaza's Jewish community was roughly 3,000 years old, and in 1481 there were sixty Jewish households. At the time of the 1929 Palestine riots, there were fifty families living in Gaza, most of whom fled after the riots. In Sami Hadawi's land and population survey, Gaza had a population of 34,250, including 80 Jews in 1945. Most of them left the city after the 1948 War, due to mutual distrust between them and the Arab majority. Today, there are no Jews living in Gaza.

== Economy ==
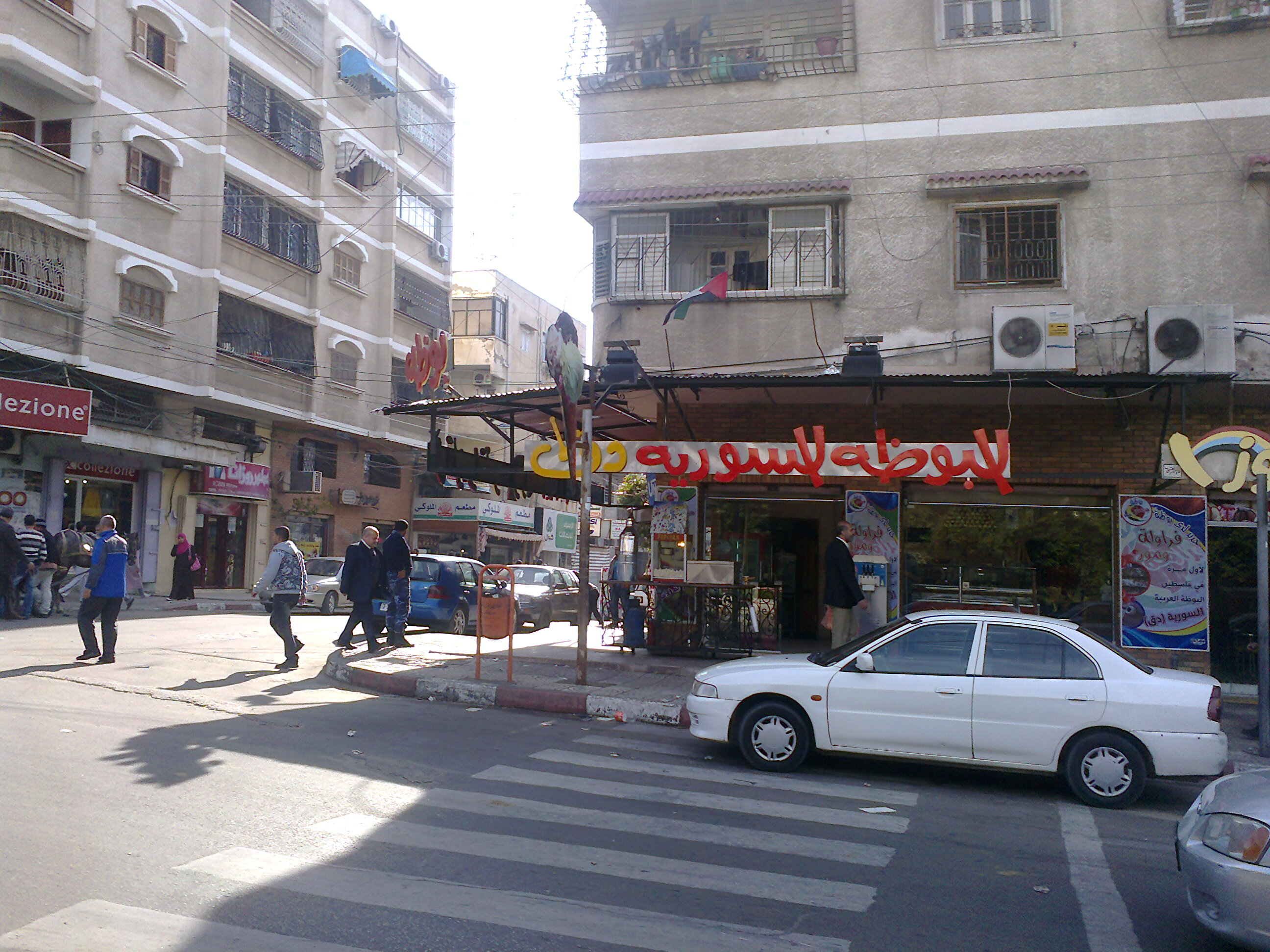
Gaza City in 2012

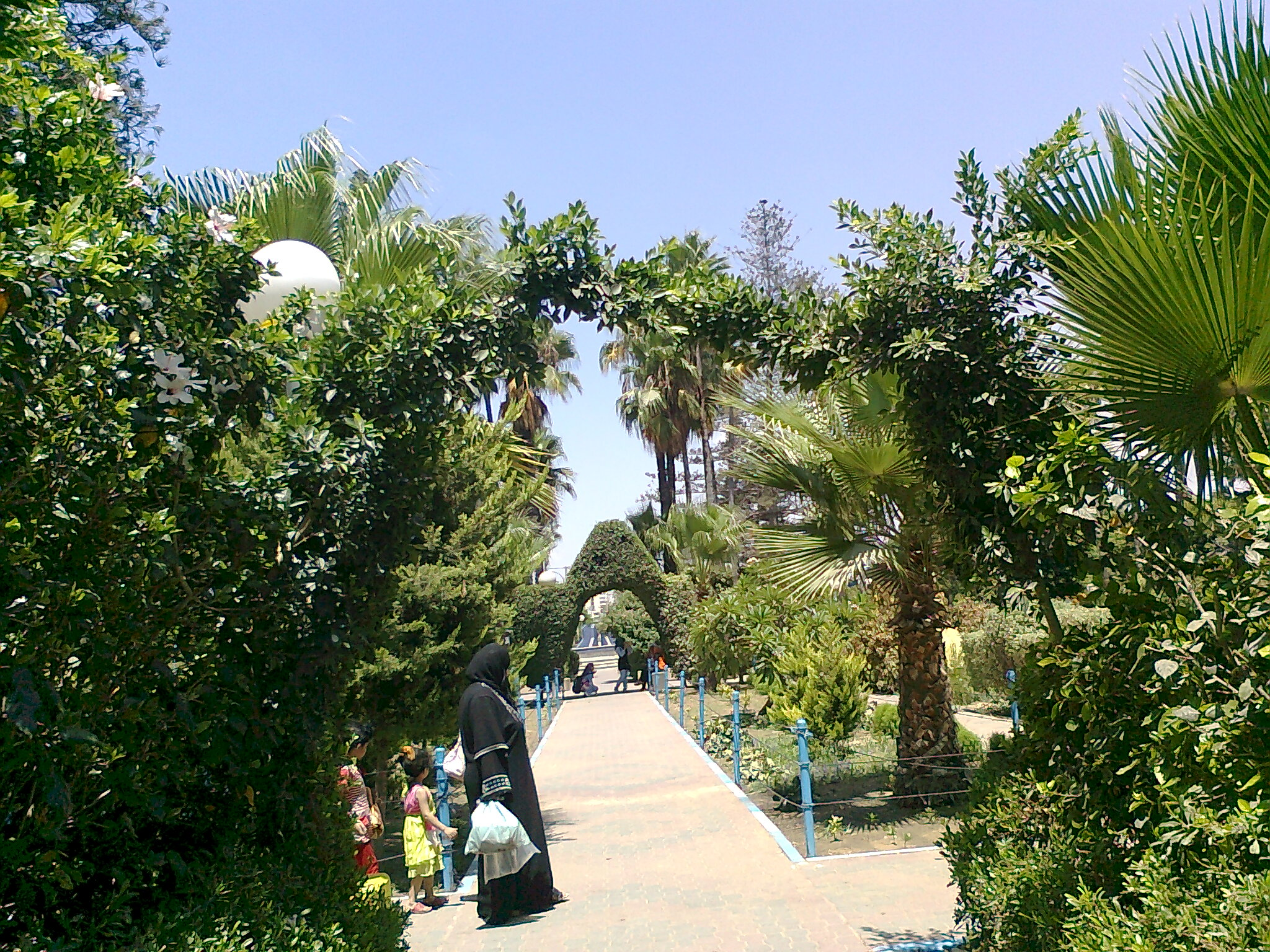
Gaza park, 2012

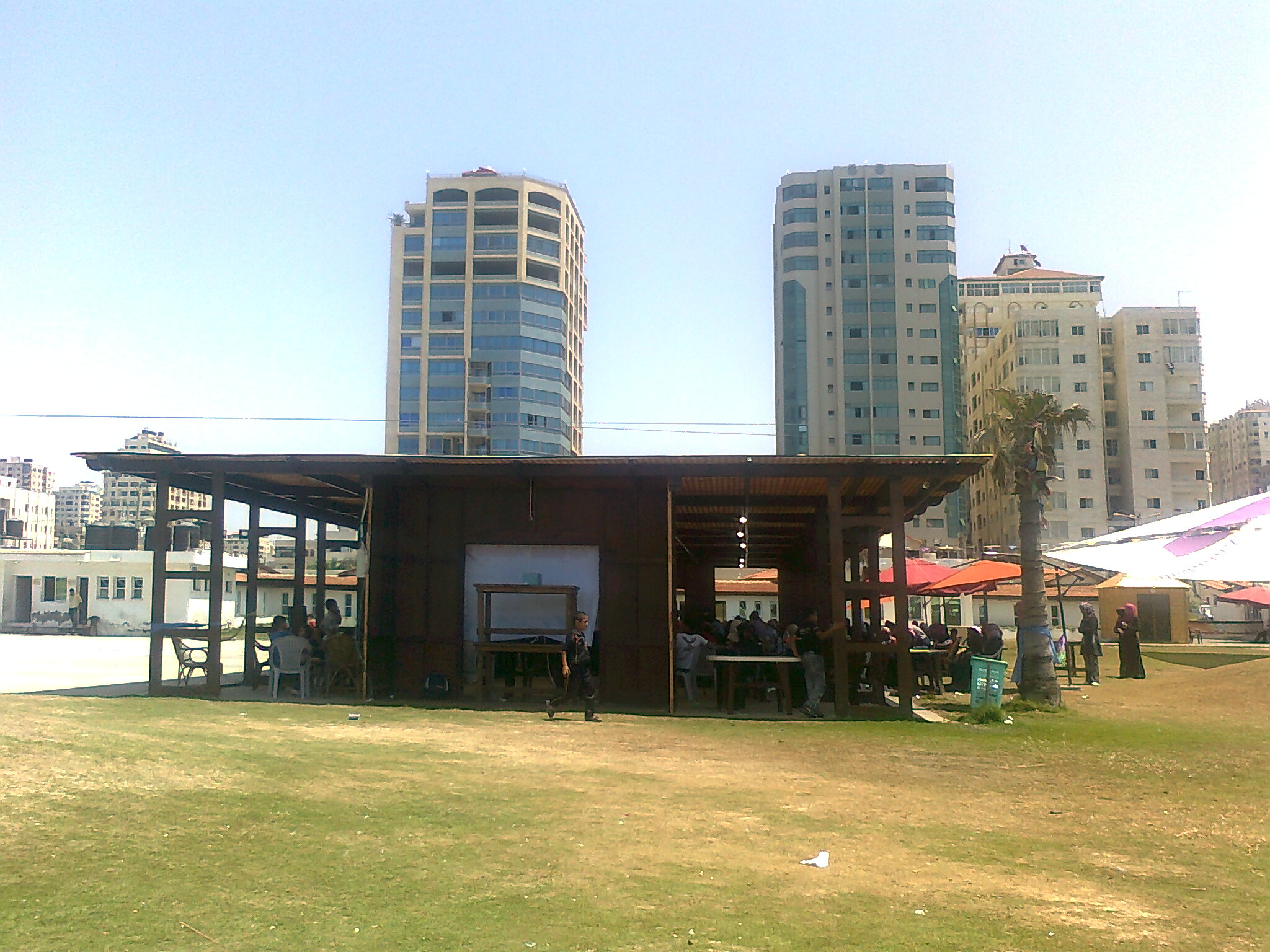
A beach resort in Gaza City in 2010

The major agricultural products are strawberries, citrus, dates, olives, flowers, and various vegetables. Pollution and high demand for water have reduced the productive capacity of farms in the Gaza Strip. Small-scale industries include the production of plastics, construction materials, textiles, furniture, pottery, tiles, copperware, and carpets. Since the Oslo Accords, thousands of residents have been employed in government ministries and security services, UNRWA and international organizations. Minor industries include textiles and food processing. A variety of wares are sold in Gaza's street bazaars, including carpets, pottery, wicker furniture, and cotton clothing. The upscale Gaza Mall opened in July 2010.

A report by human rights and development groups published in 2008 stated that Gaza had suffered a long term pattern of economic stagnation and dire development indicators, the severity which was increased exponentially by the Israeli and Egyptian blockades. The report cited a number of economic indicators to illustrate the point: In 2008, 95% of Gaza's industrial operations were suspended due to lack of access inputs for production and export problems. In 2009, unemployment in Gaza was close to 40%. The private sector which generates 53% of all jobs in Gaza was devastated and businesses went bankrupt. In June 2005, 3,900 factories in Gaza employed 35,000 people, by December 2007, only 1,700 were still employed. The construction industry was paralyzed with tens of thousands of laborers out of work. The agriculture sector was hard hit, affecting nearly 40,000 workers dependent on cash crops.

Gaza's food prices rose during the blockade, with wheat flour going up 34%, rice up 21%, and baby powder up 30%. In 2007, households spent an average of 62% of their total income on food, compared to 37% in 2004. In less than a decade, the number of families depending on UNRWA food aid increased tenfold. In 2008, 80% of the population relied on humanitarian aid in 2008 compared to 63% in 2006. According to a report by OXFAM in 2009, Gaza suffered from a serious shortage of housing, educational facilities, health facilities and infrastructure, along with an inadequate sewage system that contributed to hygiene and public health problems.

Following a significant easing of the closure policy in 2010, the economy of Gaza began to see a substantial recovery from anemic levels during the height of the blockade. The economy of Gaza grew by 8% in the first 11 months of 2010. Economic activity is largely supported by foreign aid donations. There are a number of hotels in Gaza, including the Palestine, Grand Palace, Adam, al-Amal, al-Quds, Cliff, al-Deira and Marna House. All, except the Palestine Hotel, are located along in the coastal Rimal district. The United Nations (UN) has a beach club on the same street. Gaza is not a frequent destination for tourists, and most foreigners who stay in hotels are journalists, aid workers, and UN and Red Cross personnel. Upmarket hotels include the al-Quds and the al-Deira Hotel.

Presence of hydrocarbon reserves around the region gives potential to Gaza, to develop as a leading industrial center. Many of the region’s gas and oil fields are underneath Gaza. In 1999, natural gas reserves were discovered, offshore of the territory, known as Gaza Marine. It holds 1 trillion cubic feet (28 billion cubic metres) of natural gas, as a part of the Levant Basin, which itself holds 122 trillion cubic feet (3.5 trillion cubic metres) of natural gas. The Levant Basin on the Mediterranean Sea, which includes coastal regions of Israel, Egypt, Cyprus, Lebanon, Syria and Palestine, is estimated to have 1.7 billion barrels (270,000,000 m^{3}) of oil. Gaza is the only coastal part of the State of Palestine. In 2000, exploration license were granted by the government to British Gas Group. However, the project was interrupted during the 2000–2005 uprisings, where supportive infrastructure, the seaport and airport was destroyed by Israel. In 2023, the work gain momentum again, until it was crashed in the ongoing war. A large number of people used to believe that, Gaza's oil and gas reserves is the reason for Israel's offensive on the territory, also described as a potential genocidal campaign.

== Culture ==
=== Cultural centers and museums ===
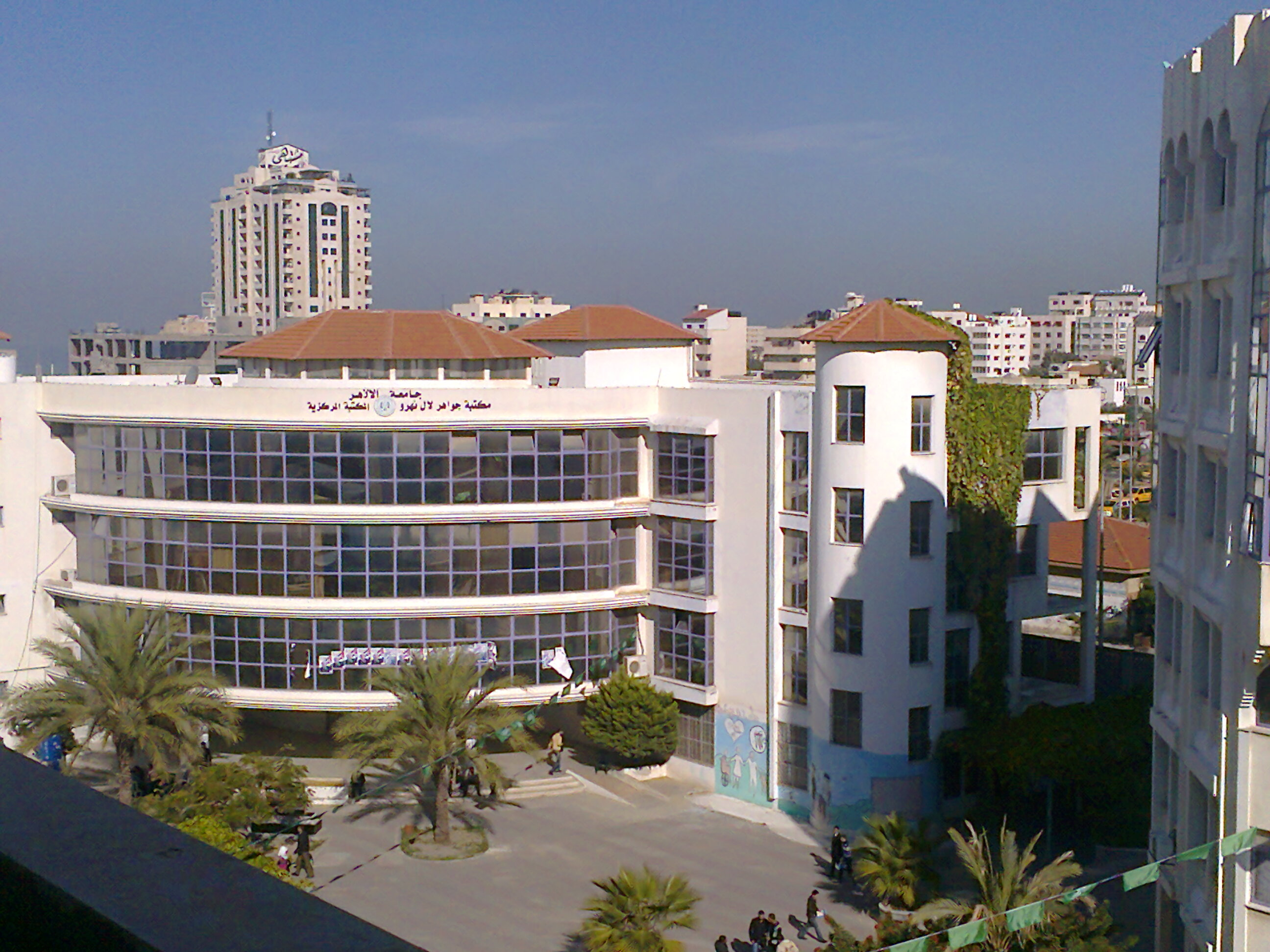
Nehru Library and Cultural Center at Gaza's Al-Azhar University

The Rashad Shawa Cultural Center, located in Rimal, was completed in 1988 and named after its founder, former mayor Rashad al-Shawa. A two-story building with a triangular plan, the cultural center performs three main functions: a meeting place for large gatherings during annual festivals, a place to stage exhibitions, and a library. The French Cultural Center is a symbol of French partnership and cooperation in Gaza. It holds art exhibits, concerts, film screenings, and other activities. Whenever possible, French artists are invited to display their artwork, and more frequently, Palestinian artists from the Gaza Strip and the West Bank are invited to participate in art competitions.

Established in 1998, the Arts and Crafts Village is a children's cultural center with the objectives of promoting comprehensive, regular and periodic documentation of creative art. It interacted on a large scale with a class of artists from different nationalities and organized around 100 exhibitions for creative art, ceramics, graphics, carvings and others. Nearly 10,000 children from throughout the Gaza Strip have benefited from the Arts and Crafts Village.

The Gaza Theater, financed by contributions from Norway, opened in 2004. The theater does not receive much funding from the PNA, depending mostly on donations from foreign aid agencies. The A. M. Qattan Foundation, a Palestinian arts charity, runs several workshops in Gaza to develop young artistic talent and impart drama skills to teachers. The Gaza Theater Festival was inaugurated in 2005.

The Gaza Museum of Archaeology opened in the summer of 2008. The museum collection features thousands of items, including a statue of a full-breasted Aphrodite in a diaphanous gown, images of other ancient deities and oil lamps featuring menorahs.

=== Cuisine ===
Gaza's cuisine is characterized by its generous use of spices and chillies. Other major flavors and ingredients include dill, chard, garlic, cumin, lentils, chickpeas, pomegranates, sour plums and tamarind. Many of the traditional dishes rely on clay pot cooking, which preserves the flavor and texture of the vegetables and results in fork-tender meat. Traditionally, most Gazan dishes are seasonal and rely on ingredients indigenous to the area and its surrounding villages. Poverty has also played a role in many of the city's simple meatless dishes and stews, such as saliq wa adas ("chard and lentils") and bisara (fava beans mashed with dried mulukhiya leaves and chilies).

Seafood is a key aspect of Gaza life and a local staple, Some well-known seafood dishes include zibdiyit gambari, literally, "shrimps in a clay pot", and shatta which are crabs stuffed with red hot chili pepper dip, then baked in the oven. Fish is either fried or grilled after being stuffed with cilantro, garlic, chillies and cumin, and marinated with various spices. It is also a key ingredient in sayyadiya, rice cooked with caramelized onions, a generous amount of whole garlic cloves, large chunks of well-marinated fried fish, and spices such as turmeric, cinnamon, and cumin. Many of the 1948-era refugees were fellahin ("peasants") who ate seasonal foods. Sumaghiyyeh, popular in Gaza not just on Ramadan but all year round, is a mixture of sumac, tahina and water combined with chard, chunks of beef and chickpeas. The dish is topped with crushed dill seeds, chillies and fried garlic and served in bowls. Maftool is a wheat-based dish flavored with dried sour plums that is served like couscous or shaped into little balls and steamed over stew or soup.

Most Gaza restaurants are located in the Rimal district. Al-Andalus, which specializes in fish and seafood, is popular with tourists, as are al-Sammak and the upscale Roots Club. Atfaluna is a stylish restaurant near Gaza port run and staffed by deaf people with the goal of building a society that is more accepting of people with disabilities.

Throughout the Old City there are street stalls that sell cooked beans, hummus, roasted sweet potatoes, falafel, and kebabs. Coffee houses (qahwa) serve Arabic coffee and tea. Gaza's well-known sweet shops, Saqqala and Arafat, sell common Arab sweet products and are located off Wehda Street. Alcohol is a rarity, found only in the United Nations Beach Club.

=== Costumes and embroidery ===
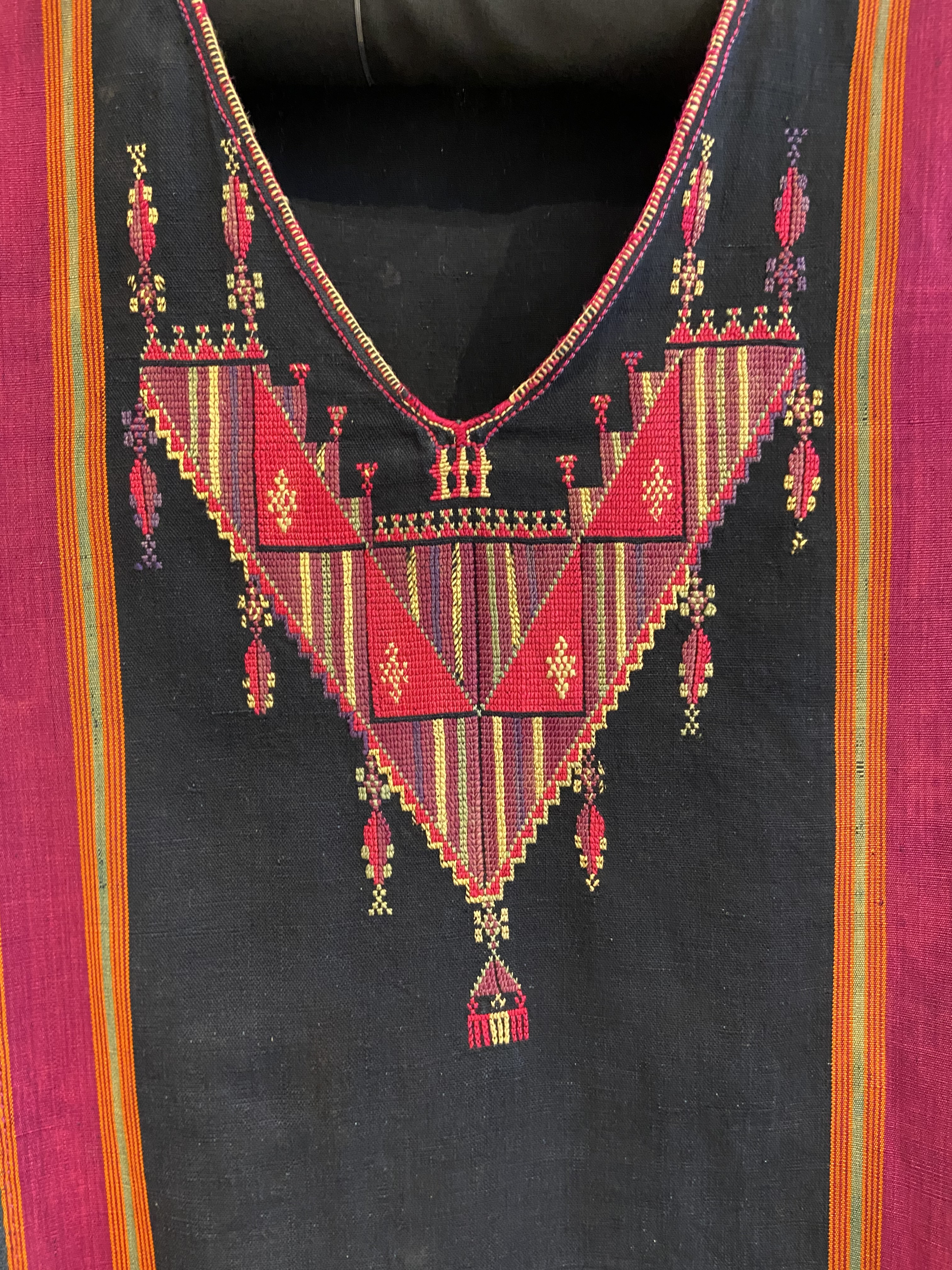
Chest panel from Gaza dress

Gauze is reputed to have originated in Gaza. Cloth for the Gaza thob was often woven at nearby Majdal. Black or blue cottons or striped pink and green fabric that had been made in Majdal continued to be woven throughout the Gaza Strip by refugees from the coastal plain villages until the 1960s. Thobs here had narrow, tight, straight sleeves. Embroidery was much less dense than that applied in Hebron. The most popular motifs included: scissors (muqass), combs (mushut) and triangles (hijab) often arranged in clusters of fives, sevens and threes, as the use of odd numbers is considered in Arab folklore to be effective against the evil eye.

Circa 1990, Hamas and other Islamic movements sought to increase the use of the hijab ("headscarf") among Gazan women, especially urban and educated women, and the hijab styles since introduced have varied according to class and group identity.

=== Sports ===
Palestine Stadium, the Palestinian national stadium, is located in Gaza and has a capacity for 10,000 people. Gaza has several local football teams that participate in the Gaza Strip League. They include Khidmat al-Shatia (al-Shati Camp), Ittihad al-Shuja'iyya (Shuja'iyya neighborhood), Gaza Sports Club, and al-Zeitoun (Zeitoun neighborhood).

== Governance ==
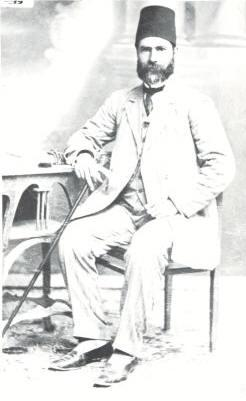
Said al-Shawa, the first mayor of Gaza

Today, Gaza serves as the administrative capital of the Gaza Governorate. It contains the currently defunct Palestinian Legislative Council building.

The first municipal council of Gaza was formed in 1893 under the chairmanship of Ali Khalil Shawa. Modern mayorship, however, began in 1906 with his son Said al-Shawa, who was appointed mayor by the Ottoman authorities. Al-Shawa oversaw the construction of Gaza's first hospital, several new mosques and schools, the restoration of the Great Mosque, and the introduction of the modern plow to the city. In 1922, British colonial secretary Winston Churchill requested that Gaza develop its own constitution under Mandatory Palestine. However, it was rejected by the Palestinians.

On 24 July 1994, the PNA proclaimed Gaza the first city council in the Palestinian territories. The 2005 Palestinian municipal elections were not held in Gaza, nor in Khan Yunis or Rafah. Instead, Fatah party officials selected the smaller cities, towns, and villages to hold elections, assuming they would fare better in less urban areas. The rival Hamas party, however, won the majority of seats in seven of the ten municipalities selected for the first round with voter turnout being around 80%. 2007 saw violent clashes between the two parties that left over 100 dead, ultimately resulting in Hamas taking over the city.

Normally, Palestinian municipalities with populations over 20,000 and that serve as administrative centers have municipal councils consisting of fifteen members, including the mayor. The current municipal council of Gaza, however, consists of fourteen members, including the installed by Hamas mayor, Nizar Hijazi.

== Education ==
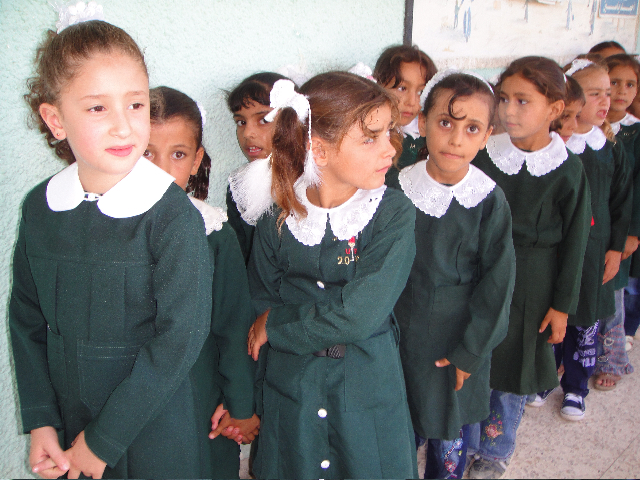
Schoolgirls in Gaza lining up for class, 2009

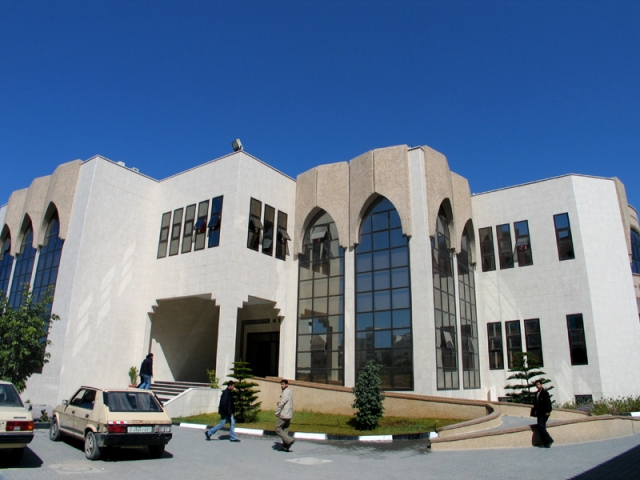
The main conference hall of the Islamic University of Gaza

According to the PCBS, in 1997, approximately over 90% of Gaza's population over the age of 10 was literate. Of the city's population, 140,848 were enrolled in schools (39.8% in elementary school, 33.8% in secondary school, and 26.4% in high school). About 11,134 people received bachelor diplomas or higher diplomas.

In 2006, there were 210 schools in Gaza; 151 were run by the Education Ministry of the Palestinian National Authority, 46 were run by the United Nations Relief and Works Agency, and 13 were private schools. A total of 154,251 students were enrolled and 5,877 teachers were employed. The currently downtrodden economy has affected education in the Gaza Strip severely. In September 2007, a UNRWA survey in the Gaza Strip revealed that there was a nearly 80% failure rate in schools grades four to nine, with up to 90% failure rates in mathematics. In January 2008, the United Nations Children's Fund reported that schools in Gaza had been canceling classes that were high on energy consumption, such as information technology or science labs, and extracurricular activities.

=== Universities ===
Gaza has many universities. The four main universities in the city are al-Azhar University – Gaza, al-Quds Open University, al-Aqsa University and the Islamic University of Gaza. The Islamic University, consisting of ten facilities, was founded by a group of businessmen in 1978, making it the first university in Gaza. It had an enrollment of 20,639 students. Al-Azhar is generally secular and was founded in 1992. Al-Aqsa University was established in 1991. Al-Quds Open University established its Gaza Educational Region campus in 1992 in a rented building in the center of the city originally with 730 students. Because of the rapid increase of the number of students, it constructed the first university owned building in the Nasser District. In 2006–07, it had an enrollment of 3,778 students.

=== Public library ===
The Public Library of Gaza is located off Wehda Street and has a collection of nearly 10,000 books in Arabic, English and French. A total area of about 1,410 square metres (15,200 sq ft), the building consists of two floors and a basement. The library was opened in 1999 after cooperation dating from 1996 by Gaza under mayor Aoun Shawa, the municipality of Dunkirk, and the World Bank. The library's primary objectives are to provide sources of information that meet the needs of beneficiaries, provide necessary facilities for access to available information sources, and organizing various cultural programs such as, cultural events, seminars, lectures, film presentations, videos, art and book exhibitions.

The Public Library was destroyed by an Israeli airstrike on 27 November 2023.

== Landmarks ==
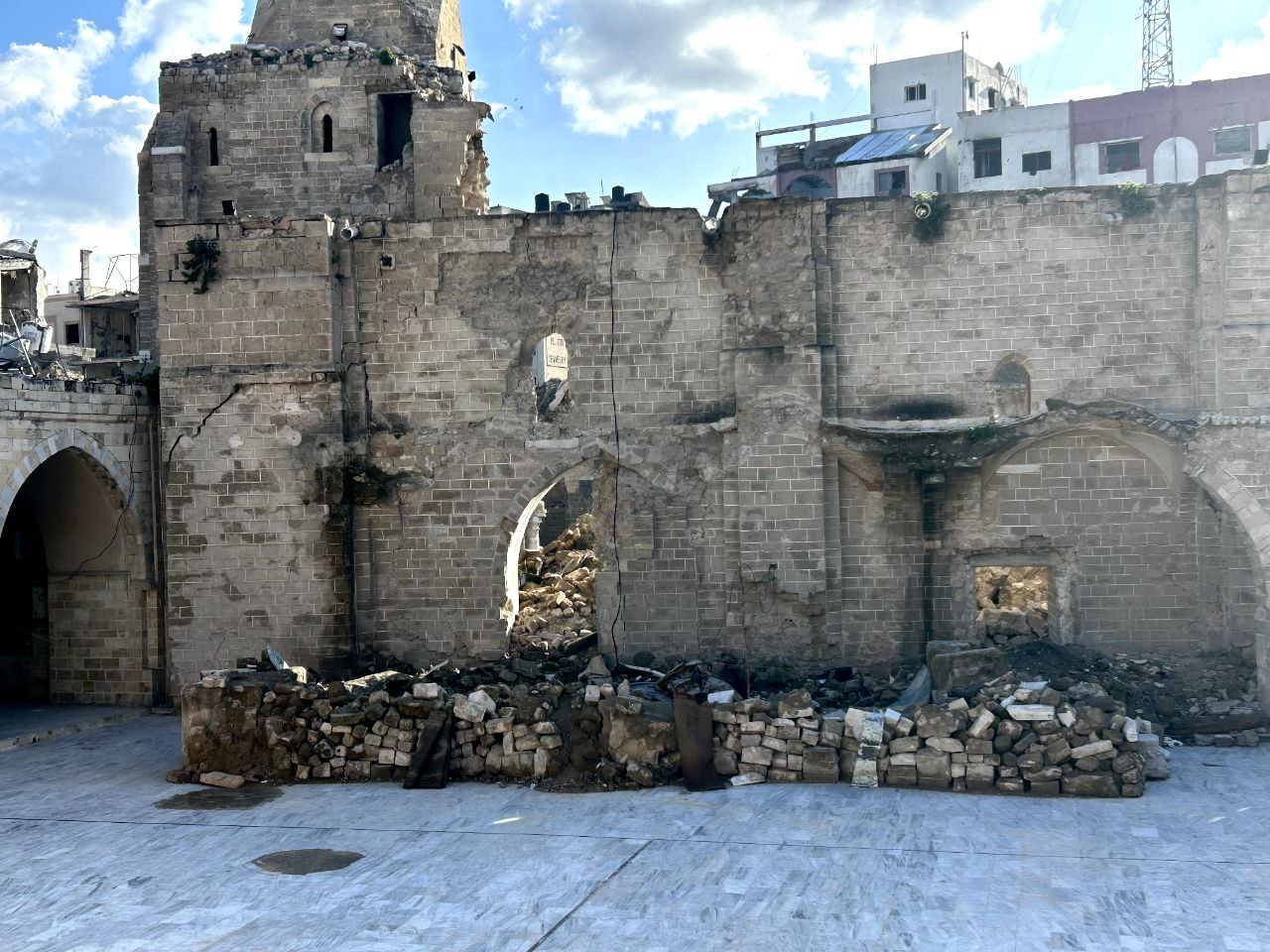
Ruins of the Great Mosque of Gaza, destroyed by Israeli bombing during the Gaza war, photo taken on January 29, 2025.

Landmarks in Gaza include the Great Mosque in the Old City. Originally a pagan temple, it was consecrated a Greek Orthodox church by the Byzantines, then a mosque in the 8th century by the Arabs. The Crusaders transformed it into a church, but it was reestablished as a mosque soon after Gaza's reconquest by the Muslims. It is the oldest and largest in the Gaza Strip. In 2023, at the beginning of the Gaza war, it was destroyed by the Israeli bombing of the Gaza Strip, leaving most of the structure collapsed and the minaret partially destroyed.

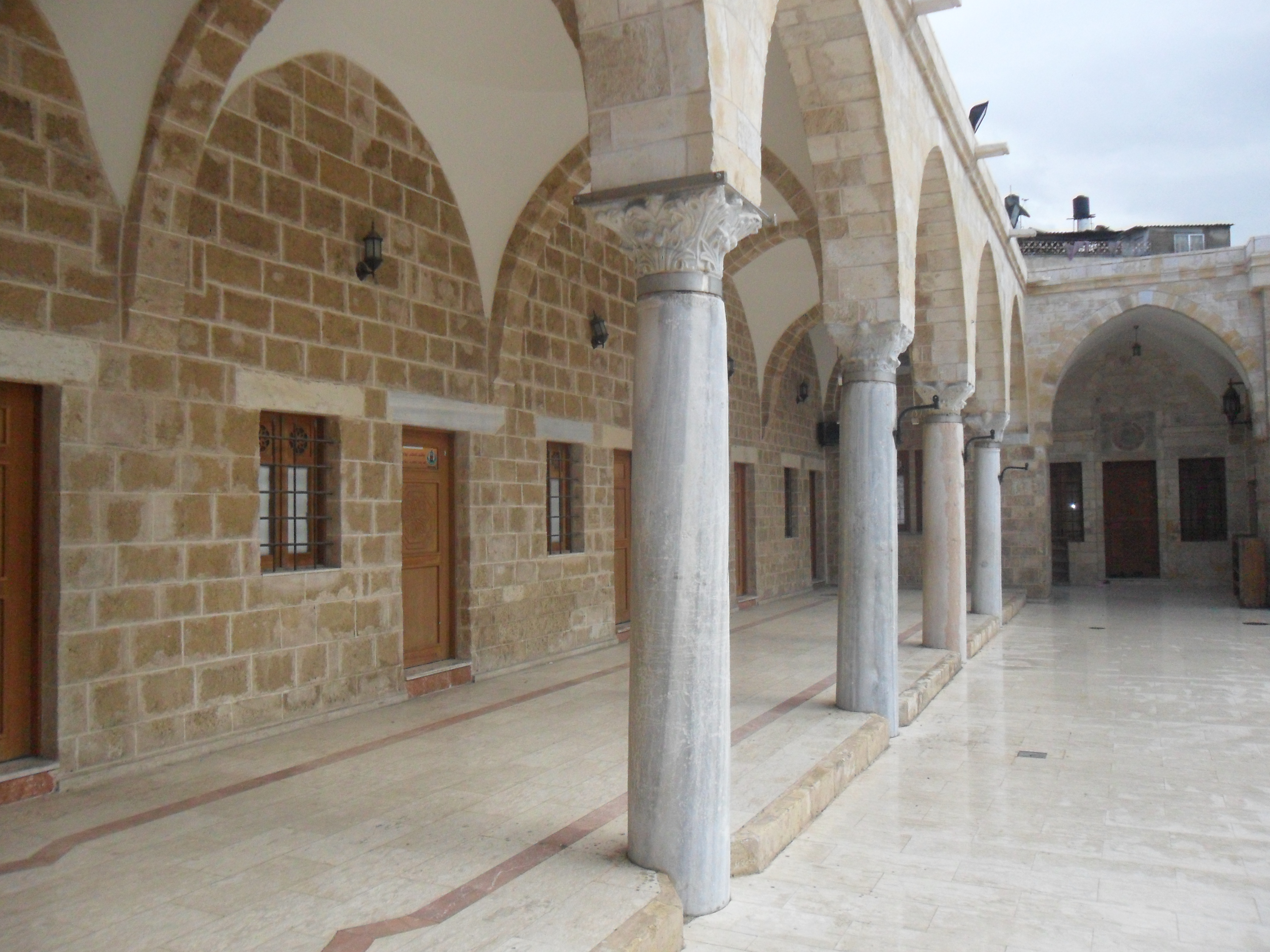
The Sayed al-Hashim Mosque in 2017. It was damaged as a result of an Israeli airstrike in October 2023, during the Israeli bombing of the Gaza Strip.

Other mosques in the Old City include the Mamluk-era Sayed al-Hashim Mosque, believed to house the tomb of the Islamic prophet Mohammed's great-grandfather, Hashim ibn Abd al-Manaf, in its dome. The building was damaged by an Israeli airstrike in October 2023, during the Israeli bombing of the Gaza Strip. There is also the nearby Kateb al-Welaya Mosque that dates back to 1334. In Shuja'iyya is the Ibn Uthman Mosque, which was built by Nablus native Ahmad ibn Uthman in 1402, and the Mahkamah Mosque built by Mamluk majordomo Birdibak al-Ashrafi in 1455. In Tuffah is the Ibn Marwan Mosque, which was built in 1324 and houses the tomb of Ali ibn Marwan, a holy man.

The Unknown Soldier's Square, located in Rimal, is a monument dedicated to an unknown Palestinian fighter who died in the 1948 War. In 1967, the monument was torn down by Israeli forces and remained a patch of sand, until a public garden was built there with funding from Norway.

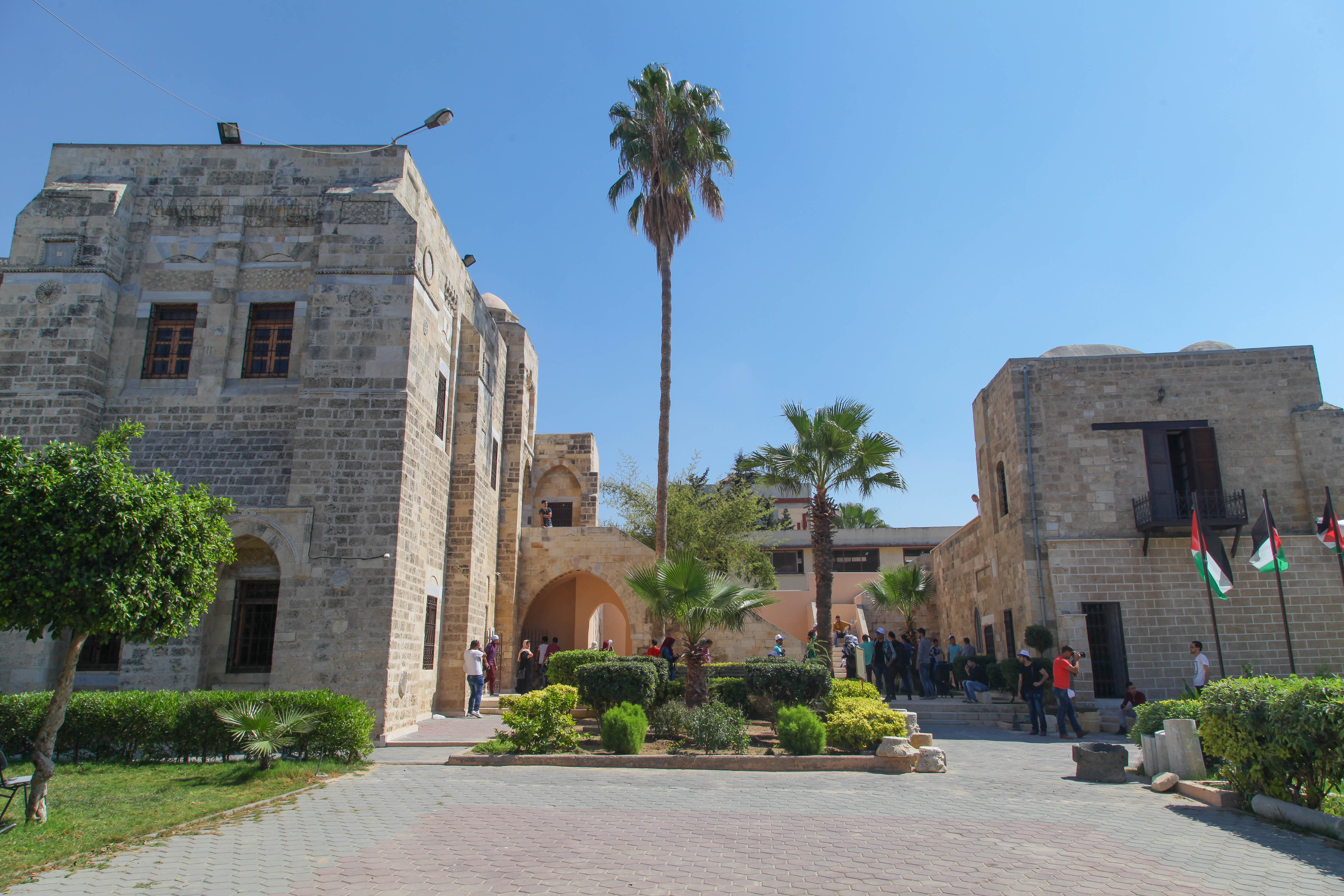
The palace of Qasr al-Basha in 2016, before its destruction in 2024

Qasr al-Basha, originally a Mamluk-era villa that was used by Napoleon during his brief sojourn in Gaza, is located in the Old City and is today a girls' school. It was destroyed in the Israeli invasion of Gaza in 2024.

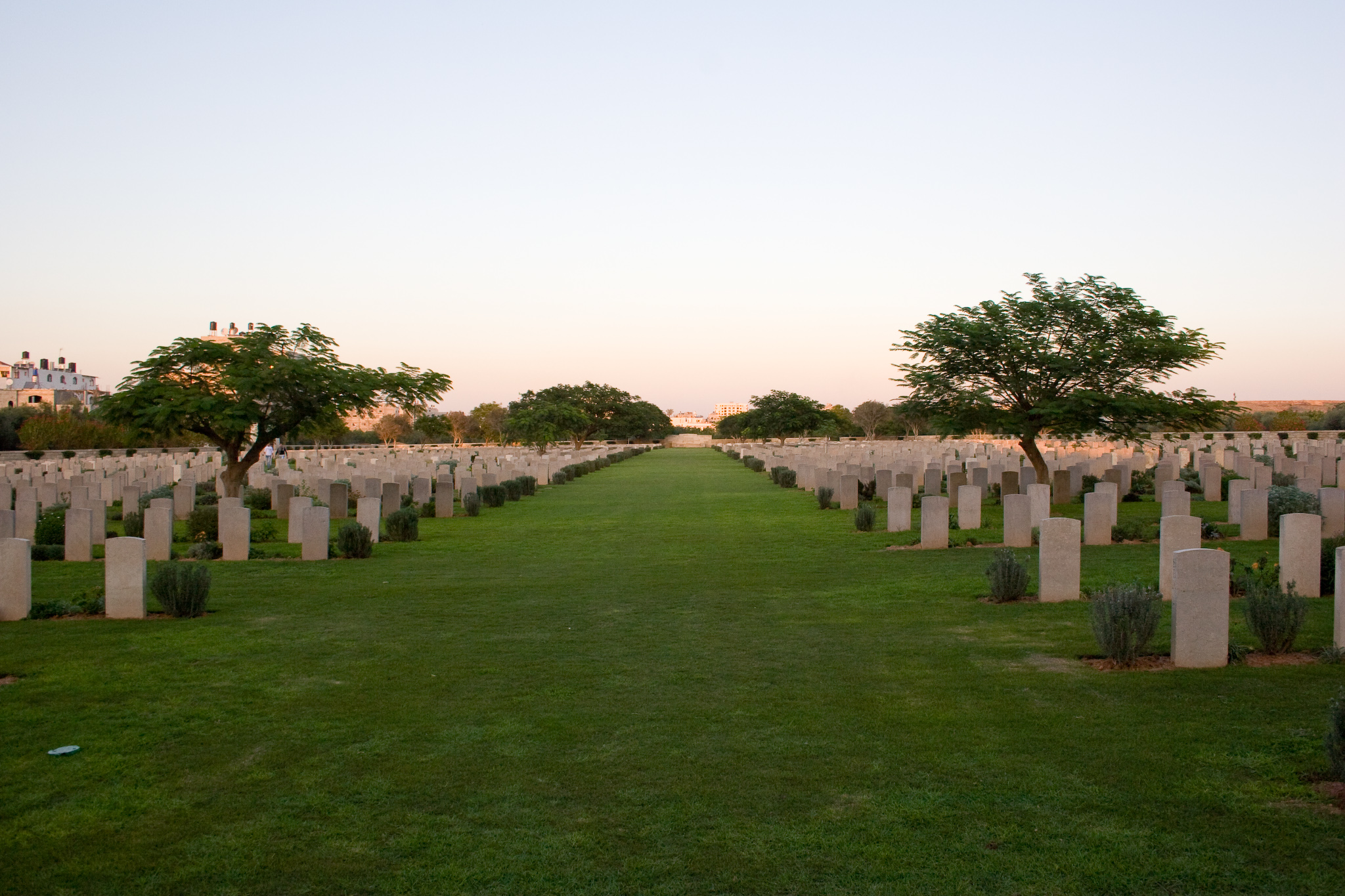
The World War I Cemetery in Gaza in 2009. It was damaged by Israeli army at the start of the Gaza war in 2023.

The Commonwealth Gaza War Cemetery, often referred to as the British War Cemetery, contains the graves of fallen Allied soldiers in World War I; it sits 1.5 km (1 mi) northeast of the city center, in the Tuffah district, near Salah al-Din Road. The cemetery has been damaged by Israeli army in the early stages of the Gaza war in 2023.

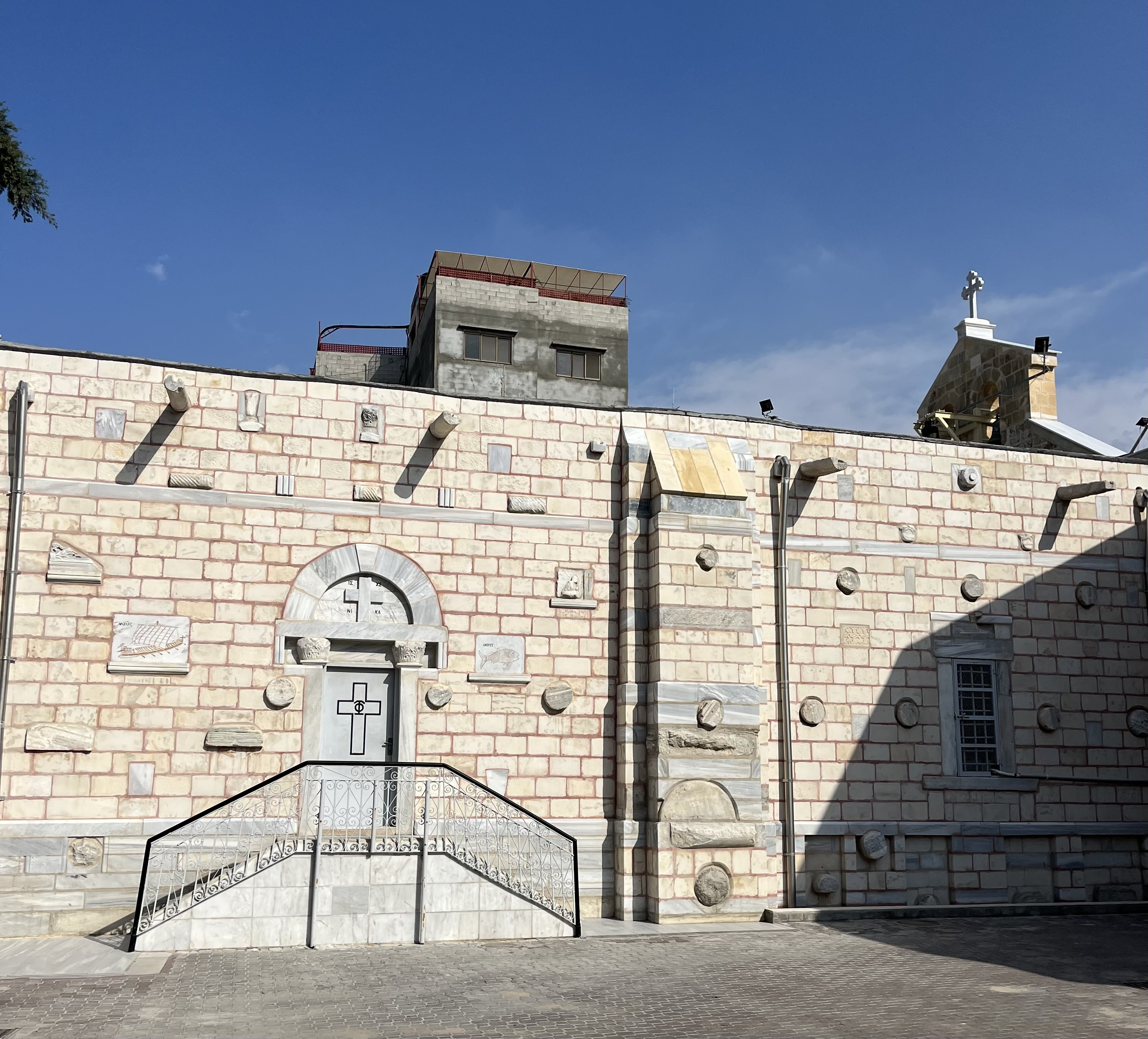
The Church of Saint Porphyrius in 2022

The Church of Saint Porphyrius, a Greek Orthodox church, oldest active church in the city and the third oldest church in the world. On 19 October 2023, part of the church was damaged during an Israeli airstrike, killing at least 18 civilians of the 450 Christian and Muslim Palestinian residents of the Gaza Strip that had been sheltering there.

== Infrastructure ==
=== Water supply and sanitation ===
According to the 1997 census by the Palestinian Central Bureau of Statistics, 98.1% of Gaza's residents were connected to the public water supply while the remainder used a private system. About 87.6% were connected to a public sewage system and 11.8% used a cesspit. The blockade on Gaza severely restricted the city's water supply. The six main wells for drinking water did not function, and roughly 50% of the population had no water on a regular basis. The municipality claimed it was forced to pump water through "salty wells" because of the unavailability of electricity. About 20 million liters of raw sewage and 40 million liters of partially treated water per day flowed into the Mediterranean Sea, and untreated sewage bred insects and mice. As a "water-poor" country, Gaza is highly dependent on water from Wadi Ghazza. The Gaza Aquifer is used as Gaza's main resource for obtaining quality water. However, the majority of water from Wadi Ghazza is transported to Jerusalem.

=== Power grid ===
In 2002 Gaza began operating its own power plant which was built by Enron. However, the power plant was bombed and destroyed by the Israel Defense Forces in 2006. Prior to the power plant's destruction Israel provided additional electricity to Gaza through the Israel Electric Corporation. The plant was partially rebuilt by December 2007, and Israeli electricity continues to be sold to Gaza.

=== Solid waste management ===
Solid waste management is one of the key compelling issues facing Gazans today. These challenges are attributed to several factors; the lack of investment in environmental systems, less attention was given to environmental projects, and the absence of law enforcement and the tendency towards crisis management. One of the main aspects of this problem is the huge quantities of rubble and debris generated as a result of Israeli bombardments.

For instance, the scale of damage resulting from Operation Protective Edge was unprecedented. All governorates in the Gaza Strip witnessed extensive aerial bombardment, naval shelling and artillery fire, resulting in a considerable amount of rubble. According to recent statistics, more than 2 million tonnes of debris was generated. Approximately 10,000 houses were leveled to the ground including two 13-story residential buildings. A tremendous amount of debris remains scattered in Gaza. Serious efforts and a high budget are required to handle this challenge. More importantly, and based on a UNEP study after the 2008 war, the debris is highly likely to be contaminated with PAHs and probably with polychlorinated biphenyls (PCBs), dioxins, and furan compounds. In January 2024, the Israeli army destroyed Gaza City’s main reservoirs, Al-Balad and Al-Rimal.

== Health care ==
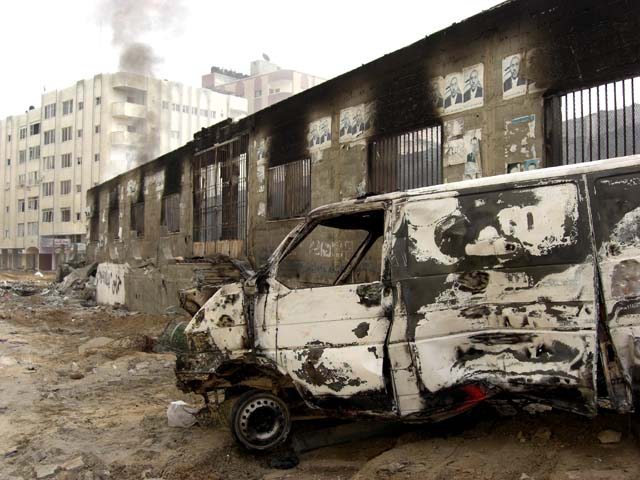
Al-Quds hospital, Gaza City, following Israeli shelling in 2009

Al-Shifa Hospital ("the Cure") was founded in the Rimal District by the British Mandate government in the 1940s. Housed in an army barracks, it originally provided quarantine and treatment for febrile diseases. When Egypt administered Gaza, this original department was relocated and al-Shifa became the city's central hospital. When Israel withdrew from the Gaza Strip after occupying it in the 1956 Suez Crisis, Egyptian president Gamal Abdel Nasser had al-Shifa hospital expanded and improved. He also ordered the establishment of a second hospital in the Nasser District with the same name. In 1957, the quarantine and febrile disease hospital was rebuilt and named Nasser Hospital. Today, al-Shifa remains Gaza's largest medical complex.

Throughout the late 1950s, a new health administration, Bandar Gaza ("Gaza Region"), was established and headed by Haidar Abdel-Shafi. Bandar Gaza rented several rooms throughout the city to set up government clinics that provided essential curative care.

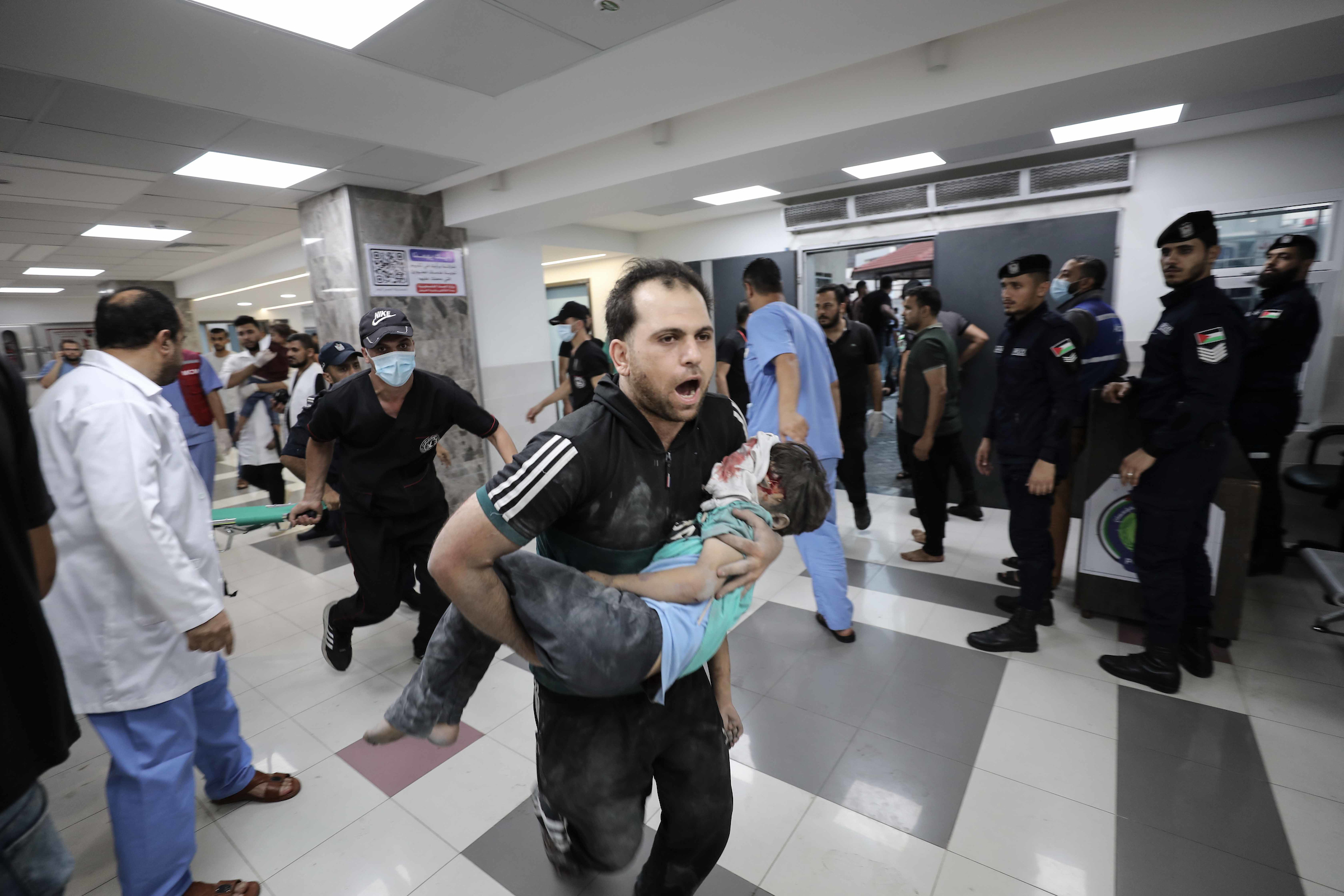
Al-Shifa Hospital in Gaza City during the Gaza war on 11 October 2023

The Ahli Arab Hospital, founded in 1907 by the Church Missionary Society (CMS), was destroyed in World War I. It was rebuilt after the war by the CMS, and in 1955 became the Southern Baptist Hospital. In 1982, the Episcopal Diocese of Jerusalem took leadership and the original name was restored. Al-Quds Hospital, located in the Tel al-Hawa neighborhood and managed by the Palestine Red Crescent Society, is the second largest hospital in Gaza.

In 2007, hospitals experienced power cuts lasting for 8–12 hours daily and diesel required for power generators was in short supply. According to the World Health Organization (WHO), the proportion of patients given permits to exit Gaza for medical care decreased from 89.3% in January 2007 to 64.3% in December 2007.

In 2010, a team of doctors from Al-Durrah Hospital in Gaza spent a year of training at the cystic fibrosis clinic at Hadassah Medical Center in Jerusalem. Upon their return to Gaza, a cystic fibrosis center was established at Al-Durrah, although the most serious cases are referred to Hadassah.

Al-Rantisi Hospital provides care for children.

== Transportation ==
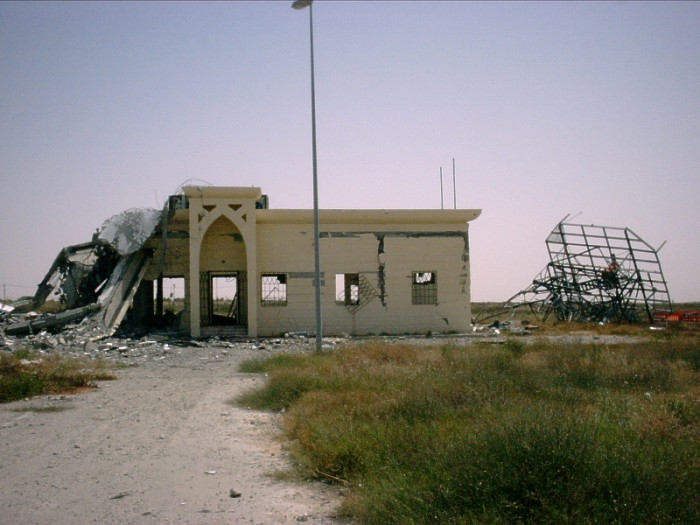
Ruins of Yasser Arafat International Airport in the southern Gaza Strip, 2002

The Rasheed Coastal Road runs along Gaza's coastline and connects it with the rest of the Gaza Strip's coastline north and south. The main highway of the Gaza Strip, Salah al-Din Road (the modern Via Maris) runs through the middle of Gaza City, connecting it with Deir al-Balah, Khan Yunis, and Rafah in the south and Jabalia and Beit Hanoun in the north. The northern crossing of Salah ad-Din Street into Israel is the Erez Crossing and the crossing into Egypt is the Rafah Crossing.

Omar Mukhtar Street is the main road in the city running north–south, branching off Salah ad-Din Street, stretching from the Rimal coastline and the Old City where it ends at the Gold Market. Prior to the Blockade of the Gaza Strip, there existed regular lines of collective taxis to Ramallah and Hebron in the West Bank. Except for private cars, Gaza City is served by taxis and buses.

The Yasser Arafat International Airport near Rafah opened in 1998 40 kilometres (25 mi) south of Gaza. Its runways and facilities were damaged by the Israel Defense Forces in 2001 and 2002, rendering the airport unusable. In 2010, the tarmac ramp was destroyed by Palestinians seeking stones and recycled building materials. The Ben Gurion International Airport in Israel is located roughly 75 kilometres (47 mi) northeast of the city.

== Notable people ==
- Israel ben Moses Najara
- Nathan of Gaza

== International relations ==
=== Twin towns and sister cities ===
Gaza is twinned with:

- Tel Aviv, Israel (1998)
- Dunkirk, France (1996)
- Turin, Italy (1997)
- Tabriz, Iran
- Tromsø, Norway (2001)
- Cascais, Portugal
- Barcelona, Spain (1998)
- Cáceres, Spain (2010)

== See also ==
- Gaza genocide
- List of cities administered by the Palestinian Authority
- List of rulers of Gaza
- Outline of the State of Palestine

== Bibliography ==
- Abu-Lughod, J.; Dumper, Michael (2007). Cities of the Middle East and North Africa: A Historical Encyclopedia. ABC-CLIO. ISBN 978-1-57607-919-5.
- Barron, J.B., ed. (1923). Palestine: Report and General Abstracts of the Census of 1922. Government of Palestine.
- Bitton-Askeloni, Bruria; Kofsky, Arieh (2004). Christian Gaza In Late Antiquity. BRILL. ISBN 978-90-04-13868-1.
- Briggs, Martin Shaw (1918). Through Egypt in War-time. London: T. Fisher Unwin Ltd.
- Butt, Gerald (1995). Life at the crossroads: a history of Gaza. Rimal Publications. ISBN 1-900269-03-1.
- Chilton, John; Hydrogeologists, International Association of (1999). Groundwater in the Urban Environment: Proceedings of the XXVII IAH Congress on Groundwater in the Urban Environment, Nottingham UK, 21–27 September 1997. Taylor and Francis. ISBN 978-90-5410-924-2.
- Cohen, Amnon; Lewis, Bernard (1978). Population and Revenue in the Towns of Palestine in the Sixteenth Century. Princeton University Press. ISBN 978-1-4008-6779-0. JSTOR j.ctt13x196g.
- Department of Statistics (1945). Village Statistics, April, 1945. Government of Palestine.
- Doumani, B. (1995). Rediscovering Palestine: Merchants and Peasants in Jabal Nablus, 1700–1900. University of California Press. ISBN 0-520-20370-4.
- Dowling, Theodore Edward (2015) [1st pub. 1913]. Gaza: A City of Many Battles (from the family of Noah to the Present Day). London: S.P.C.K. ISBN 1514878526.
- Dumper, Michael; Stanley, Bruce E.; Abu-Lughod, J. (2007). Cities of the Middle East and North Africa: A Historical Encyclopedia. ABC-CLIO. ISBN 978-1-57607-919-5.
- Feldman, Ilana (2008). Governing Gaza: Bureaucracy, Authority, and the Work of Rule, 1917–1967. Duke University Press. ISBN 978-0-8223-4240-3.
- Filiu, J.-P. (2014). Gaza: A History. Oxford University Press. ISBN 978-0-19-020189-0.
- Gil, Moshe (1997) [1983]. A History of Palestine, 634–1099. Translated by Ethel Broido. Cambridge: Cambridge University Press. ISBN 0-521-59984-9.
- Hadawi, S. (1970). Village Statistics of 1945: A Classification of Land and Area ownership in Palestine. Palestine Liberation Organization Research Center. Archived from the original on 8 December 2018.
- Husseini, Rafiq; Barnea, Tamara (2002). Separate and Cooperate, Cooperate and Separate: The Disengagement of the Palestine Health Care System from Israel and Its Emergence as an Independent System. Greenwood Publishing Group. ISBN 0-275-97583-5.
- Hütteroth, W.-D.; Abdulfattah, K. (1977). Historical Geography of Palestine, Transjordan and Southern Syria in the Late 16th Century. Erlanger Geographische Arbeiten, Sonderband 5. Erlangen, Germany: Vorstand der Fränkischen Geographischen Gesellschaft. ISBN 3-920405-41-2.
- Makhon le-minhal tsiburi be-Yiśraʼel (1966). Public Administration in Israel and Abroad. Israel Institute of Public Administration.
- Jacobs, Daniel; Eber, Shirley; Silvani, Francesca (1998). Israel and the Palestinian territories. Rough Guides. ISBN 978-1-85828-248-0.
- Kennedy, Hugh (2007). The Great Arab Conquests: How the Spread of Islam Changed the World We Live In. Philadelphia: Da Capo Press. ISBN 978-0-306-81585-0.
- Le Strange, G. (1890). Palestine Under the Moslems: A Description of Syria and the Holy Land from A.D. 650 to 1500. Committee of the Palestine Exploration Fund.
- Lipchin, Clive; Pallant, Eric; Saranga, Danielle (2007). Integrated Water Resources Management and Security in the Middle East. Springer. ISBN 978-1-4020-5984-1.
- Meyer, Martin Abraham (1907). History of the city of Gaza: from the earliest times to the present day. Columbia University Press.
- de Miroschedji, Pierre; Sadeq, Moain (2008). "Sakan, Tell es-". The New Encyclopedia of Archaeological Excavations in the Holy Land. Vol. 5: Supplementary Volume. Israel Exploration Society/Biblical Archaeology Society (BAS). Archived from the original on 23 June 2024 – via BAS Library.
- Patai, R. (1999). The Children of Noah: Jewish Seafaring in Ancient Times (3rd, illustrated ed.). Princeton University Press. ISBN 978-0-691-00968-1.
- Pringle, D. (1993). The Churches of the Crusader Kingdom of Jerusalem: Volume I A-K (excluding Acre and Jerusalem). Cambridge University Press. ISBN 0-521-39036-2.
- Ring, Trudy; Salkin, Robert M.; Schellinger, Paul E. (1994). International Dictionary of Historic Places. Taylor & Francis. ISBN 978-1-884964-03-9.
- Robinson, E.; Smith, E. (1841). Biblical Researches in Palestine, Mount Sinai and Arabia Petraea: A Journal of Travels in the year 1838. Vol. 2. Boston: Crocker & Brewster.
- Sabbagh, K. (2008). Palestine: History of a Lost Nation. Grove Press. ISBN 978-1-900949-48-4.
- Shahin, Mariam (2005). Palestine: A Guide. Interlink Books. ISBN 1-56656-557-X.
- Sharon, M. (2009). Corpus Inscriptionum Arabicarum Palaestinae, G. Vol. 4. BRILL. ISBN 978-90-04-17085-8.
- Shatzman, I. (1991). The armies of the Hasmonaeans and Herod: from Hellenistic to Roman frameworks. Mohr Siebeck. ISBN 978-3-16-145617-6.
- Sheehan, Sean (2000). Israel Handbook: With the Palestinian Authority Areas. Footprint Travel Guides. ISBN 978-1-900949-48-4.
- Ze'evi, Dror (1996). An Ottoman Century: The District of Jerusalem in the 1600s. SUNY Press. ISBN 0-7914-2915-6.
