= 2024 Gaza Strip polio outbreak =

Disease outbreak in the Gaza Strip, Palestine

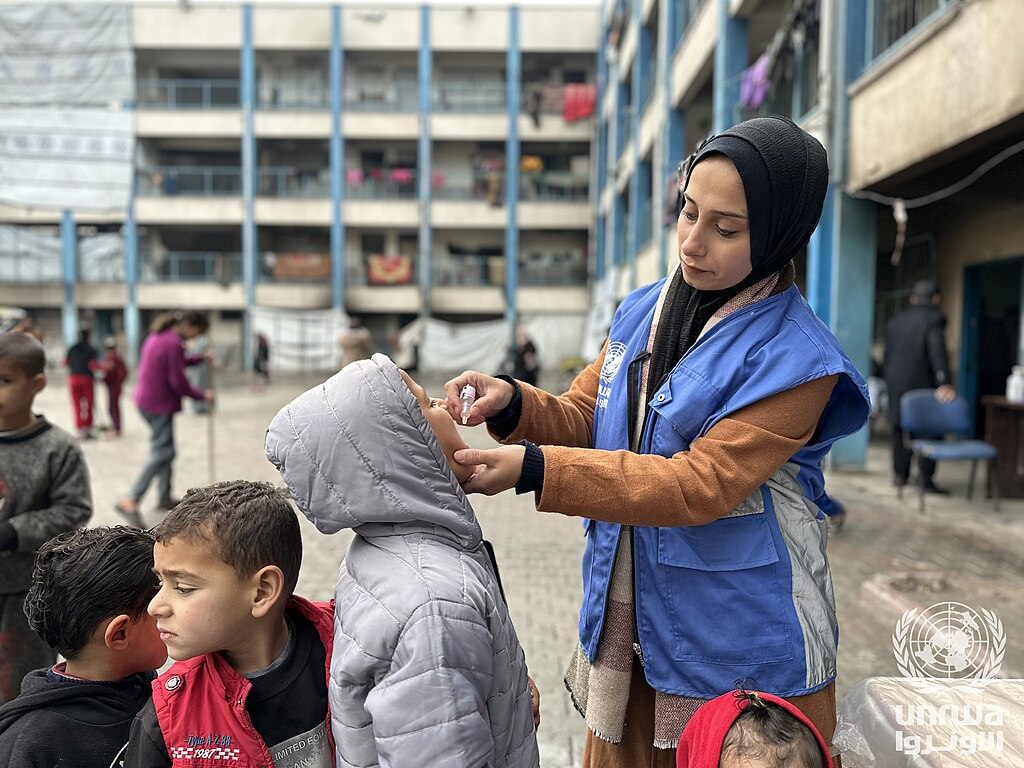
- A displaced child receives a polio vaccination in an UNRWA shelter in Beach camp, Gaza Strip
- Disease: Polio
- Pathogen: Circulating vaccine–derived poliovirus type 2 (cVDPV2)
- Source: Wastewater
- Location: Khan Yunis and Deir al-Balah, Gaza Strip
- First reported: Central Gaza Strip
- Date: 16 July 2024 – present
- Confirmed cases: 1
- Active cases: 1
- Suspected cases: 3

The 2024 Gaza Strip polio outbreak involves circulating vaccine-derived poliovirus type 2 (cVDPV2) in the Gaza Strip, first discovered on 16 July 2024 and officially declared an epidemic by the Gaza health ministry on 29 July. The epidemic marked the first occurrence of poliovirus in the Gaza Strip since the virus was completely eradicated from the region 25 years prior.

The Gaza health ministry stated that the epidemic presented a significant risk to Gaza's citizens and to bordering countries, and called the outbreak "a setback to the global polio eradication program". The World Health Organization reported that it was "very likely" that polio cases infected citizens of Gaza and were spreading among its population, although detecting cases would be very challenging due to the virus being asymptomatic in most cases and due to Israeli medical blockades preventing confirmation of cases.

On 16 August, tests in Jordan confirmed the first polio infection in Gaza, located in the central Gaza strip. So far the United Nations has confirmed one case of paralysis in a 10-month-old baby.

On 29 August 2024, Israel made a "preliminary commitment" to comply to pauses in the fighting to facilitate a vaccination campaign. 14 days later the World Health Organization reported that polio vaccination for children of the Gaza strip was achieved.

== Background ==
The Gaza Strip is experiencing a humanitarian crisis as a result of the Gaza war. The crisis includes both an impending famine and the destruction of its healthcare system. At the start of the war, Israel tightened its blockade on the Gaza Strip, which has resulted in significant shortages of fuel, food, medication, water, and essential medical supplies. This siege resulted in a 90% drop in electricity availability, impacting hospital power supplies, sewage plants, and shutting down the desalination plants that provide drinking water. Widespread disease outbreaks have spread across Gaza as a result.

Public health experts warned of the outbreak and spread of disease in Gaza. According to Oxfam and the United Nations, Gaza's lack of clean water and sanitation would trigger a rise in cholera and other harmful and potentially-deadly infectious diseases. Oxfam stated Gaza's sewage pumping stations and wastewater treatment facilities had ceased operations, so the buildup of solid waste and unburied bodies were likely vectors of disease. Due to the lack of clean drinking water, Gaza residents were drinking water contaminated with sewage, seawater, and farm water, another major source of disease. WHO egional emergency director Richard Brennan stated, "The conditions are ripe for the spread of a number of diarrhoeal and skin diseases".

Raw sewage overflowed in the streets, causing a significant health and environmental disaster. Flooding in Gaza spread sewage water, raising fears of the spread of disease. On 19 January, Yahya Al-Sarraj, the mayor of Gaza City, stated more than 50,000 tons of trash had accumulated in the city, further leading to the spread of disease. Parents reported children falling sick after being exposed to raw sewage. In May 2024, the UN stated, "Mosquitoes, flies and rats are spreading, and so are diseases." Oxfam reported the threat of disease outbreaks due to an accumulation of "human waste and rivers of sewage in the streets".

== Epidemiology ==
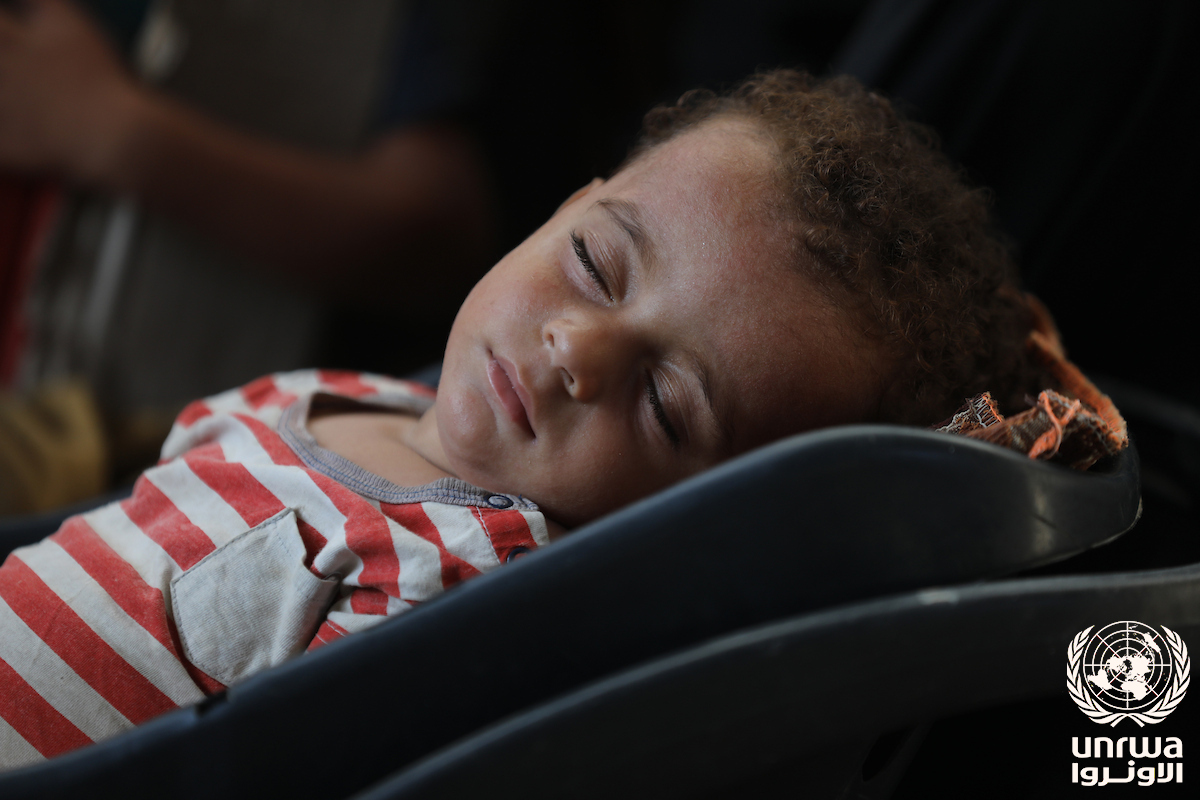
Palestinian child Abdul Rahman Abu Al-Jidyan, 11 months old, is the first child to be infected with polio in 25 years due to the Gaza war

On 16 July 2024, an investigation of sewage sites in the Gaza Strip by the Global Polio Laboratory Network of the World Health Organization (WHO) discovered traces of circulating vaccine-derived poliovirus type 2 in all six test samples among two regions in Khan Yunis and Deir al-Balah. Genomic sequencing of the isolated poliovirus traces by the Centers for Disease Control and Prevention (CDC) found that they had close genetic linkage between each other, and were closely related to cVDPV2 that circulated in Egypt throughout the 2nd half of 2023 and was last detected in December 2023. Research into genetic changes present in the samples indicated that the poliovirus could have spread to Gaza as soon as September 2023.

As of 23 July 2024, no tests had yet been conducted for polio cases or symptoms of paralysis in humans. WHO and UNICEF planned to bring fifty human sample kits to the Gaza Strip on 25 July 2024 and investigate them at a lab in Jordan. In late-July, three cases of acute flaccid paralysis were diagnosed in the Gaza Strip with researchers determining that poliovirus was a potential cause, leading them to take samples of the cases and send them to Jordan for analysis.

The WHO reported that Gaza immunization rates were at 99% in 2022, and fell to 89% in 2023 due to decimation of the Gazan health system in addition to "lack of security, access obstruction, constant population displacement, shortages of medical supplies, poor quality of water and weakened sanitation".

Dr. Lior Nesher, the Israeli Infectious Disease Institute director at the Beersheba Soroka Medical Hospital, claimed that attempts to halt the "ecological movement" of the poliovirus would be "almost impossible", emphasizing that the virus "does not respect borders". He reported that the poliovirus could spread from sewage to underground aquifers as a result of flooding during the rainy season. He stated that even though most Israeli soldiers were immunized against the virus, they could still carry it in their clothes, in mud, and in feces produced with bowel movements, which could cause the virus to spread throughout Israel. He also noted a marked increase in vaccine non-compliance in Israel compared to a few years ago, which could allow the virus to spread easier throughout non-immunized citizens and unvaccinated children. According to his statistics, rates of Israeli measles vaccination were below herd immunity percentages of 92–93%, which could indicate a lack of herd immunity towards polio in the Israeli population were the virus to circulate in Israel.

On 29 July, the Gaza Health Ministry officially declared a polio epidemic in the Gaza Strip, stating that the circulating poliovirus throughout large deposits of wastewater posed a significant health threat to Gaza and countries bordering it. The ministry called the epidemic "a setback to the global polio eradication program" and placed blame on the destruction of hospitals and medical infrastructure by Israel. On 30 July, the WHO reported that it was "very likely" that polio had infected and spread among citizens Gaza.

On 16 August, the Palestinian Ministry of Health recorded the first confirmed case of polio in Gaza in the city of Deir al-Balah. The first polio victim was a ten-month old baby who "stopped crawling, stopped moving, stopped standing up, and stopped sitting."

By March 2025, no further child cases had been confirmed, but environmental surveillance in Gaza confirmed continued transmission of circulating vaccine-derived poliovirus type 2. A third polio vaccination round, held from 22 to 26 February 2025, reached 602,795 children under the age of ten.

== Response ==
=== Humanitarian response ===
Head of WHO's Palestinian team Dr. Ayadil Saparbekov stated that organization workers were conducting risk assessments and distributing information about protection from polio to the Gazan population. He noted that it would be very difficult for citizens to be able to follow the guidelines recommended due to the lack of wastewater and sanitation treatment and the resulting buildup of waste and debris in densely crowded refugee encampments throughout the Gaza Strip.

Efforts to limit the spread of the disease were significantly complicated by difficulties in moving humanitarian aid into Gaza including sanitation equipment and adequate nutrition. In addition, dangerous conditions in the Gaza Strip due to military assaults and airstrikes prevented safe allocation of resources across the territory to isolated regions and populations with the greatest susceptibility.

==== WHO vaccination drive ====
On 12 September 2024 the World Health Organization reported reaching the target of polio vaccination for children of the Gaza strip. One week later, the United Nations stated that its second round of polio vaccinations would include doses of micronutrients and a nutritional screening. The W.H.O. began its second round of polio vaccinations on 14 October 2024. It was delayed due to intense bombardment in northern Gaza, however, where the campaign had sought to vaccinate more than 100,000 children.

In early-November 2024, WHO stated it would resume polio vaccinations in northern Gaza but only in Gaza City. The following day, however, an Israeli drone reportedly bombed the polio vaccination site, the Sheikh Radwan Clinic, wounding three children. The World Health Organization later stated six people, including four children, were injured in the strike. UNICEF condemned the strike, stating, "Health workers and other humanitarian staff cannot do their jobs in the midst of ongoing attacks."

In February 2025, another polio vaccination campaign was held in the Gaza Strip, reaching nearly 603,000 children under age 10 with the novel oral polio vaccine type 2 (nOPV2). A ceasefire allowed health teams to operate simultaneously across all five governorates. The drive was part of an emergency measure to contain the ongoing poliovirus outbreak and limit further transmission.

=== Israeli response ===
The IDF started a voluntary vaccination campaign for its soldiers. It also announced it was cooperating with humanitarian agencies for vaccine delivery in Gaza, with ~300,000 vaccines delivered since the start of the conflict in October 2023. The vaccine drive reportedly came after United States Secretary of State Antony Blinken pushed Israeli Prime Minister Benjamin Netanyahu in a meeting.

Human Rights Watch stated that both Israel's attacks on healthcare and water infrastructure and obstruction of humanitarian aid were worsening the polio epidemic.

== See also ==
- Blockade of Gaza
- Gaza genocide
- Polio in Pakistan
- Polio eradication
- History of polio
