= Rashad al-Shawwa =

Mayor of Gaza

Rashad Al-Shawwa
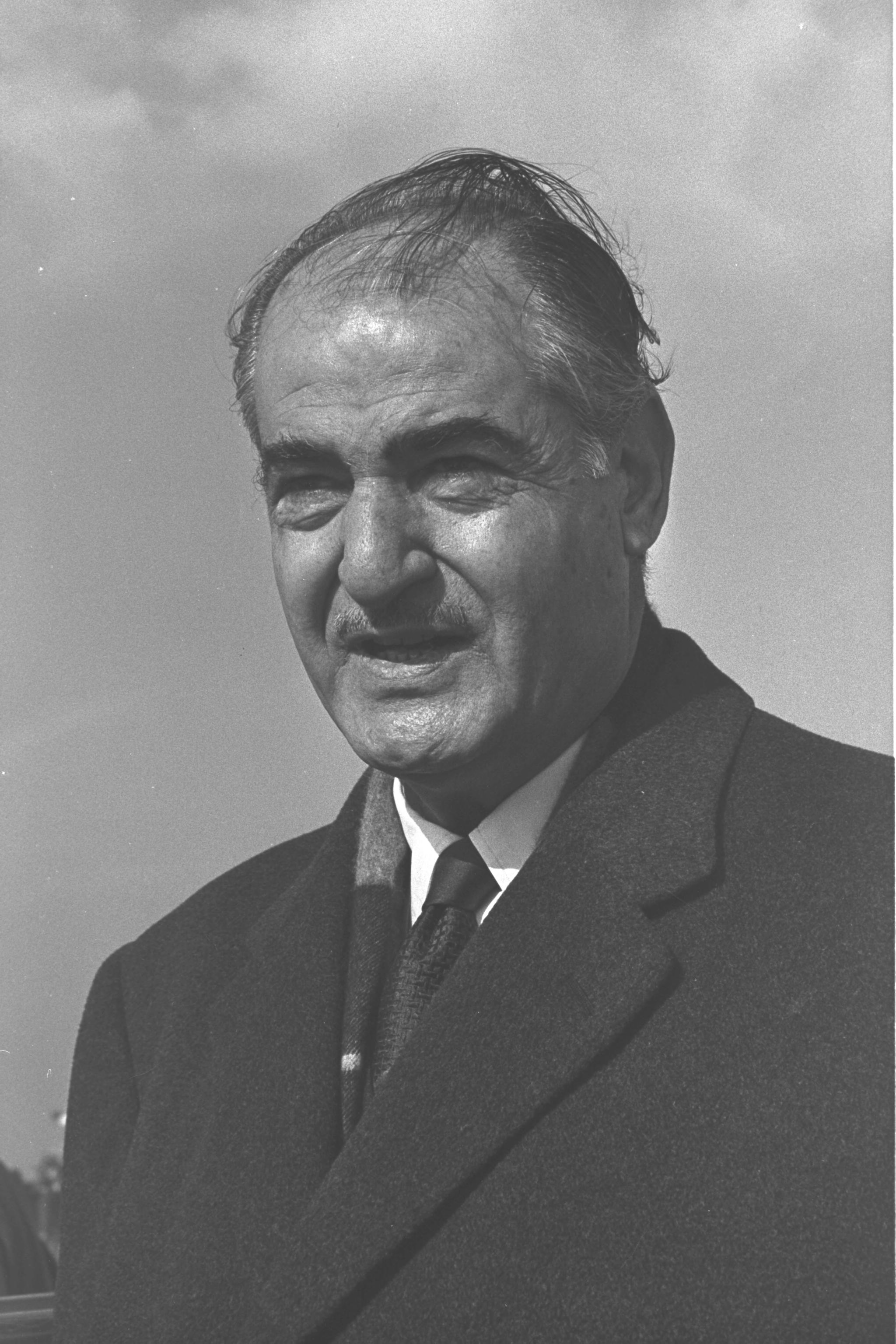
- 1972 photograph of al-Shawwa

Mayor of Gaza City
- In office 1972–1982
- Preceded by: Ragheb Al-Alami
- Succeeded by: Aoun Al-Shawwa

Personal details
- Born: c. 1909 Gaza, Palestine
- Died: 28 September 1988 Gaza, Palestine
- Children: 6, including Laila al-Shawwa and Rawya al-Shawwa

Rashad al-Shawwa (Arabic: رشاد الشوا) (1909 – 28 September 1988) was the Palestinian mayor of Gaza for eleven years from 1971 to 1982. Before becoming mayor he was an outgoing local activist in the city. He was known by Israelis and Palestinians as the pro-Jordanian "father figure" of the Gaza Strip. He is the father of artist Laila Shawwa.

== Early life and education ==
Al-Shawwa was born in 1909 into one of Gaza City's most prominent families. He was the youngest of five sons of Sa'id al-Shawwa, a former mayor of Gaza City and the South Palestine representative to the Supreme Muslim Council, a body that oversaw Muslim community affairs during the British Mandate of Palestine. Rashad's mother was Lebanese. Rashad received his primary and secondary education in public schools in the city. In 1934, he graduated from the American University in Cairo with a degree in politics and economics.

== Political career ==
In 1934 he established the first sports club in Gaza called the Center for Youth Welfare. In 1935, he was assigned the post of caretaker of a Muslim shrine in Haifa, and during his residence there, he came into contact with the Syrian revolutionary Izz ad-Din al-Qassam who was leading an insurgency against British forces in Palestine.

During the 1948 Arab-Israeli War, he helped organize the smuggling of arms from Iraq and Lebanon to the Arab Liberation Army under Fawzi al-Qawuqji. He returned to Gaza during this time period. In 1950, he founded the newspaper Sha'ab al-Arabiya ("The Arab Nation"). It was the mouthpiece of the Palestinians and he presided over the editing, but it ended after an eight-month circulation. Shawwa was appointed by Egyptian president Muhammad Naguib to "cleanse" Gaza of corruption and any remnants of the monarchy of Farouk of Egypt.

== Mayor of Gaza City ==
=== First term (1971–1972) ===
Shawwa was appointed mayor of Gaza by Israel in 1971. He took over responsibility for the management of the municipality and made the decision to not annex adjacent Palestinian refugee camps to the city such as al-Shati and Jabalia. He commenced the development of the economic sector in the Gaza Strip, working on major projects for the export of locally grown citrus to the Arab world, and establishing a juice factory which still exists off Salah al-Din Street.

The Israeli government removed deposed Shawwa from office in 1972 for his pro-Palestinian nationalist stance.

=== Second term (1976–1982) ===
The Israeli government re-appointed Shawwa as Mayor of Gaza City in 1976.

In January 1982, Shawwa joined Mayor of Bethlehem Elias Freij in publicly calling for the PLO to officially recognise the State of Israel, while also calling for the Israeli government to recognise the PLO.

In July 1982, the Israeli government deposed Shawwa from his position as mayor of Gaza, along with the entire Gaza City council, accusing them of failing to cooperate with Israeli military rule of the Gaza Strip. Shawwa and the council had refused to work in the city hall building since the March 1982 Palestinian general strike that had been triggered by the deposal of the Al-Bireh city council by the Israeli government, working from home instead in a symbolic protest. Shawwa and the council had also refused to sign an order from the Israeli military forbidding them from making political statements.

== Later life and death ==
Shawwa's local influence in Gaza remained strong after his deposal as mayor, largely because of his chairmanship of the Gaza Benevolent Society, which dispensed Jordanian funds.

During the First Intifada, Shawwa publicly sympathized with the participants of the uprising, saying "People here have reached a point where they don't see much difference between life and death under the insulting and degrading conditions of military occupation."

On 28 September 1988, Shawwa died of a heart attack in his Gaza home at 79 years of age. Israeli President Chaim Herzog and Minister of Defence Yitzhak Rabin both sent telegrams of condolences to his family. The Israeli military attempted to limit the size of Shawwa's funeral by imposing lockdowns on the suburbs of Gaza City, but the soldiers deployed to the city were ordered to avoid confronting funeral demonstrators, even when the demonstrators raised the Palestinian flag over the mosque where the funeral service was held, in violation of the Israeli occupation laws.

== Political positions ==
According to Gil Sedan of the Jewish Journal, Al-Shawwa was considered one of "more moderate" Palestinian leaders, saying that while Shawwa "deeply resented the humiliation of living under military occupation," he "cautioned against hasty solutions. He always stressed the need to end the Israeli administration of the territories before a Palestinian state could be established," adding that Shawwa "was a key figure of the pro-Jordanian camp in the administered territories and refused to blindly follow the guidelines of the Palestine Liberation Organization."

== Legacy ==
In 1988, the Rashad Shawa Cultural Center in Gaza was completed. The Center was destroyed by Israeli forces in late 2023, during the Gaza war.

== Bibliography ==
- Filiu, Jean-Pierre (2014). Gaza: A History. London: C. Hurst & Co. ISBN 978-1-84904-401-1.
