= History of the Gaza Strip =

The history of the Gaza Strip refers to the history of the Gaza Strip, primarily since the end of Mandatory Palestine.

== Before 1948 ==
Historically part of the Palestine region, the area was controlled since the 16th century by the Ottoman Empire; in 1906, the Ottomans and the British Empire set the region's international border with Egypt. With the defeat of the Central Powers in World War I and the subsequent partition of the Ottoman Empire, the British deferred the governance of the Gaza Strip area to Egypt, which declined the responsibility. Britain itself kept and ruled the territory it occupied in 1917–18, from 1920 until 1948 under the internationally accepted frame of "Mandatory Palestine". During that period, villages along the Gaza coastal plain expanded significantly, with both demographic increase and intensified agricultural production.

== 1948–1959: All-Palestine government ==
During the 1948 Palestine war and more specifically the 1948 Arab–Israeli War, tens of thousands of Palestinian refugees fled or were expelled to the Gaza Strip. By the end of the war, 25% of Mandatory Palestine's Arab population was in Gaza, though the Strip constituted only 1% of the land. The same year, the United Nations Relief and Works Agency for Palestine Refugees in the Near East (UNRWA) was established to administer various refugee programmes.

On 22 September 1948 (near the end of the Arab–Israeli War), in the Egyptian-occupied Gaza City, the Arab League proclaimed the All-Palestine Government, partly to limit Transjordan's influence over Palestine. The All-Palestine Protectorate was quickly recognized by six of the Arab League's then-seven members (excluding Transjordan): Egypt, Syria, Lebanon, Iraq, Saudi Arabia, and Yemen.

After the cessation of hostilities, the Israel–Egypt Armistice Agreement of 24 February 1949 established the line of separation between Egyptian and Israeli forces, as well as the modern boundary between Gaza and Israel, which both signatories declared not to be an international border. The southern border with Egypt was unchanged.

Palestinians living in Gaza or Egypt were issued All-Palestine passports. Egypt did not offer them citizenship. From the end of 1949, they received aid directly from UNRWA. During the Suez Crisis (1956), Gaza and the Sinai Peninsula were occupied by Israeli troops, who withdrew under international pressure. The All-Palestine government was accused of being little more than a façade for Egyptian control, with negligible independent funding or influence. It subsequently moved to Cairo and dissolved in 1959 by decree of Egyptian president Gamal Abdul Nasser.

== 1956–1957: Israeli occupation ==
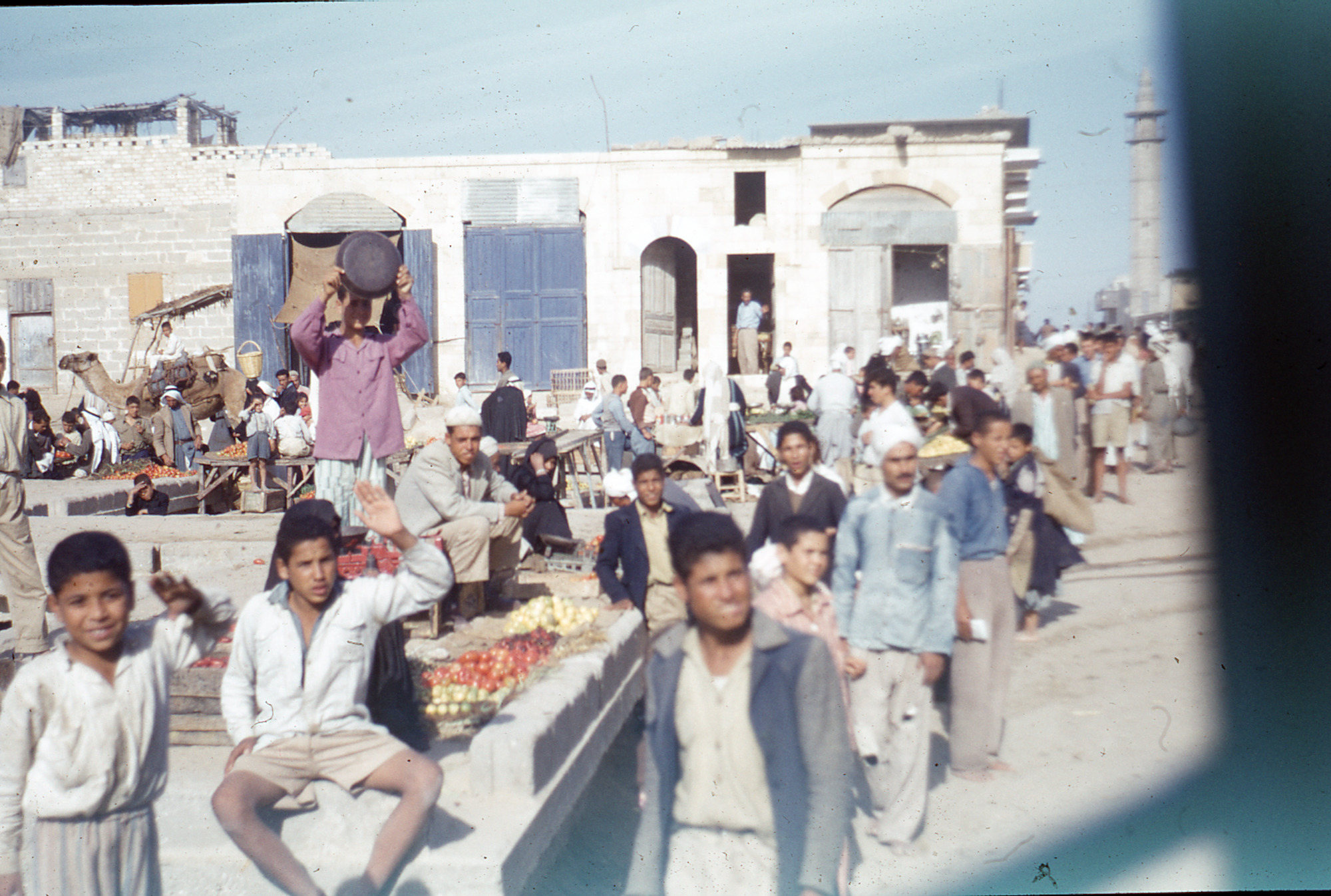
Palestinians in an outdoor market in the Gaza Strip in 1956

During the 1956 Suez Crisis (the Second Arab–Israeli war), Israel invaded Gaza and the Sinai Peninsula. On 3 November, the Israel Defense Forces (IDF) attacked Egyptian and Palestinian forces at Khan Yunis. The city of Khan Yunis resisted being captured, and Israel responded with a heavy bombing campaign that inflicted heavy civilian casualties. After a fierce battle, the Israeli 37th Armored Brigade's Sherman tanks broke through the heavily fortified lines outside of Khan Yunis held by the 86th Palestinian Brigade.

After some street-fighting with Egyptian soldiers and Palestinian fedayeen, Khan Yunis fell to the Israelis. Upon capturing Khan Yunis, the IDF committed an alleged massacre. Israeli troops started executing unarmed Palestinians, mostly civilians; in one instance men were lined up against walls in central square and executed with machine guns. The claims of a massacre were reported to the United Nations General Assembly on 15 December 1956 by UNRWA director Henry Labouisse, who reported from "trustworthy sources" that 275 people were killed in the massacre, of which 140 were refugees and 135 local residents.

On 12 November, days after the hostilities had ended, Israel killed 111 people in the Rafah refugee camp during Israeli operations, provoking international criticism.

Israel ended the occupation in March 1957, amid international pressure. During the four-month Israeli occupation, 900–1,231 people were killed. According to French historian Jean-Pierre Filiu, 1% of the population of Gaza was killed, wounded, imprisoned or tortured during the occupation.

== 1959–1967: Egyptian occupation ==
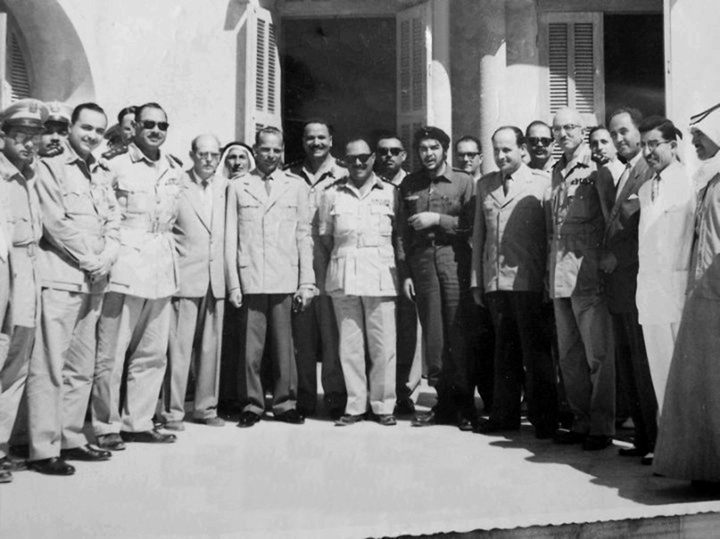
Che Guevara visiting Gaza in 1959

After the dissolution of the All-Palestine Government in 1959, under the excuse of pan-Arabism, Egypt continued to occupy Gaza until 1967. Egypt never annexed the Strip, but instead treated it as a controlled territory and administered it through a military governor. The influx of over 200,000 refugees from former Mandatory Palestine, roughly a quarter of those who fled or were expelled from their homes during, and in the aftermath of, the 1948 Arab–Israeli War into Gaza resulted in a dramatic decrease in the standard of living. Because the Egyptian government restricted movement to and from Gaza, its inhabitants could not look elsewhere for gainful employment.

== 1967: Israeli occupation ==
In June 1967, during the Six-Day War, IDF captured Gaza. Under the then head of Israel's Southern Command Ariel Sharon, dozens of Palestinians, suspected of being members of the resistance, were executed without trial.

Between 1967 and 1968, Israel evicted approximately 75,000 residents of the Gaza Strip who Golda Meir described as a "fifth column". In addition, at least 25,000 Gazan residents were prevented from returning after the 1967 war. Ultimately, the Strip lost 25% (a conservative estimate) of its prewar population between 1967 and 1968. In 1970–1971 Ariel Sharon implemented what became known as a 'five finger' strategy, which consisted in creating military areas and settlements by breaking the Strip into five zones to better enable Israeli occupation, settlement and, by discontinuous fragmentation of the Palestinian zones created, allow an efficient management of the area. Thousands of homes were bulldozed and large numbers of Bedouin families were exiled to the Sinai.

Between 1973 (after the Yom Kippur War) and 1987, official policy on economic development in the Gaza Strip remained the same as in 1969 with limited local investment and economic opportunity coming primarily from employment in Israel.

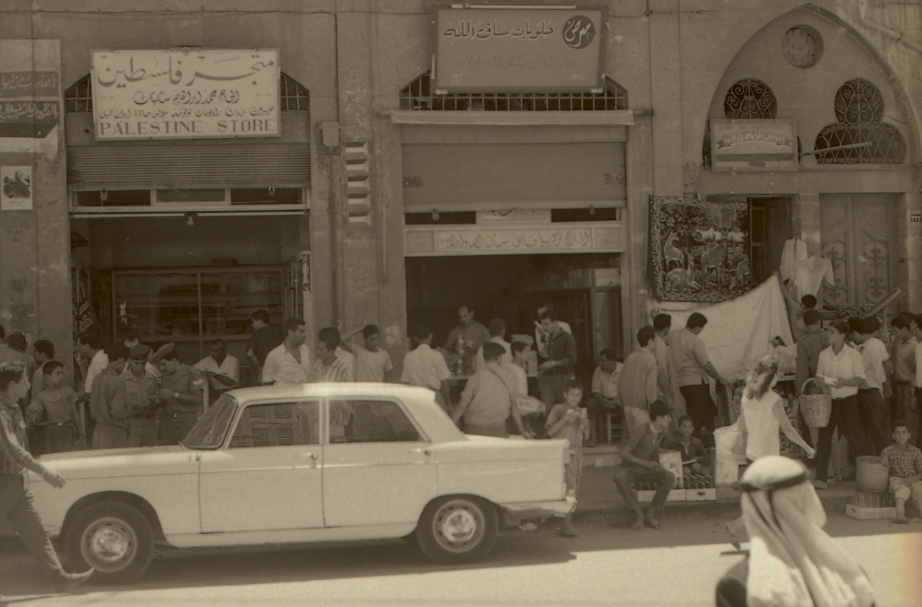
Gaza City in 1967

According to Tom Segev, moving the Palestinians out of the country had been a persistent element of Zionist thinking from early times. In December 1967, during a meeting at which the Security Cabinet brainstormed about what to do with the Arab population of the newly occupied territories, one of the suggestions Prime Minister Levi Eshkol proffered regarding Gaza was that the people might leave if Israel restricted their access to water supplies. A number of measures, including financial incentives, were taken shortly afterwards to begin to encourage Gazans to emigrate elsewhere. Following the 1967 Arab-Israeli War, "various international agencies struggled to respond" and American Near East Refugee Aid was founded to help victims of the conflict by providing immediate emergency relief.

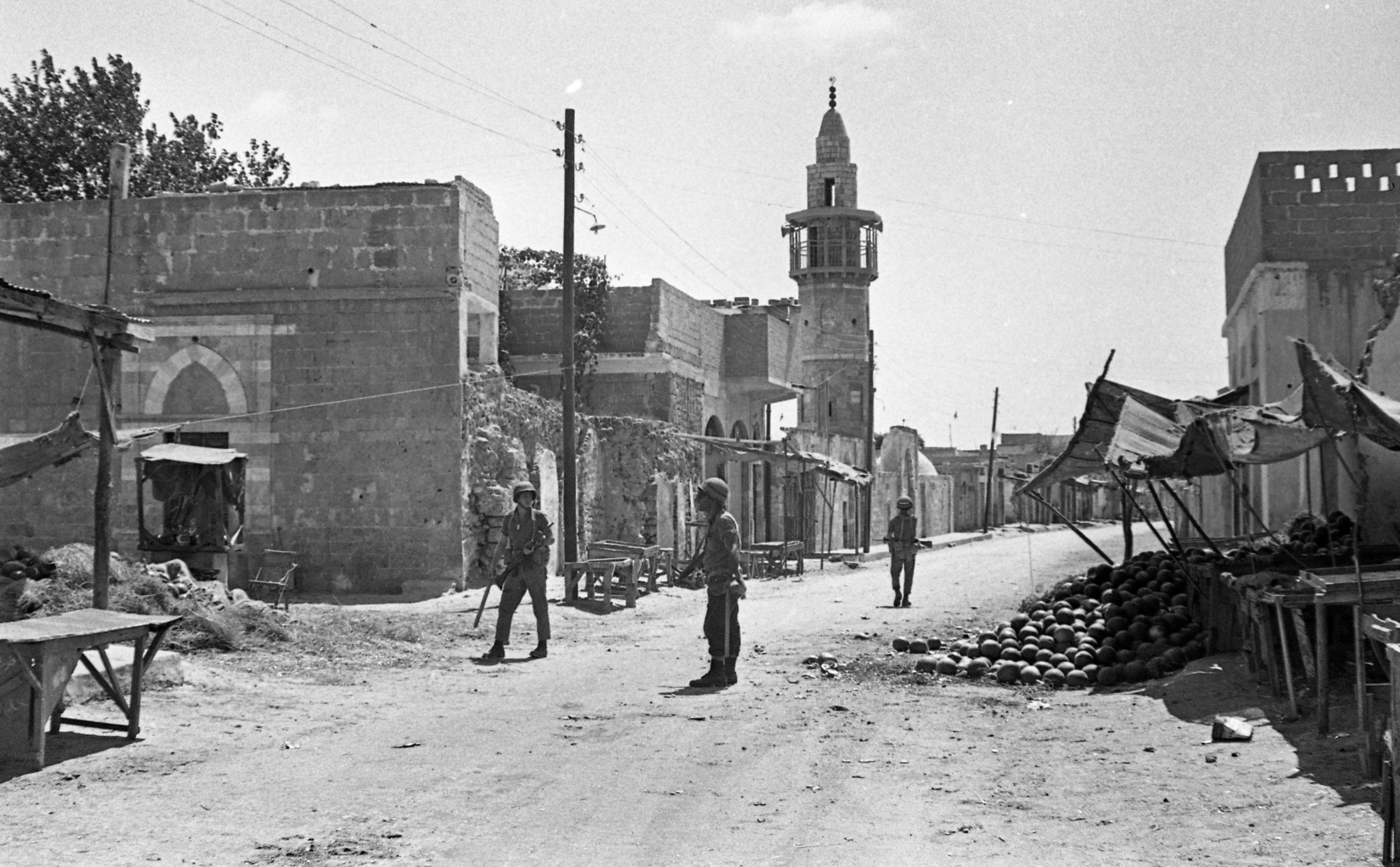
Israeli soldiers in Gaza in 1969

Subsequent to this military victory, Israel created the first Israeli settlement bloc in the Strip, Gush Katif, in a spot where a small kibbutz had previously existed for 18 months between 1946 and 1948. The kibbutz community had been established as part of the Jewish Agency's "11 points in the Negev" plan, in which 11 Jewish villages were built across the Negev in a single night as a response to the Morrison-Grady Plan, which threatened to exclude the Negev from a future Jewish State. In total, between 1967 and 2005, Israel established 21 settlements in Gaza, comprising 20% of the total territory. The economic growth rate from 1967 to 1982 averaged roughly 9.7 percent per annum, due in good part to expanded income from work opportunities inside Israel, which had a major utility for the latter by supplying the country with a large unskilled and semi-skilled workforce. Gaza's agricultural sector was adversely affected as one-third of the Strip was appropriated by Israel, competition for scarce water resources stiffened, and the lucrative cultivation of citrus declined with the advent of Israeli policies, such as prohibitions on planting new trees and taxation that gave breaks to Israeli producers, factors which militated against growth. Gaza's direct exports of these products to Western markets, as opposed to Arab markets, was prohibited except through Israeli marketing vehicles, in order to assist Israeli citrus exports to the same markets. The overall result was that large numbers of farmers were forced out of the agricultural sector. Israel placed quotas on all goods exported from Gaza, while abolishing restrictions on the flow of Israeli goods into the Strip. Sara Roy characterised the pattern as one of structural de-development.

On 26 March 1979, Israel and Egypt signed the Egypt–Israel peace treaty. Among other things, the treaty provided for the withdrawal by Israel of its armed forces and civilians from the Sinai Peninsula, which Israel had captured during the Six-Day War. The Egyptians agreed to keep the Sinai Peninsula demilitarized. The final status of the Gaza Strip, and other relations between Israel and Palestinians, was not dealt with in the treaty. Egypt renounced all territorial claims to territory north of the international border. The Gaza Strip remained under Israeli military administration. The Israeli military became responsible for the maintenance of civil facilities and services.

After the 1979 Egypt–Israel peace treaty, a 100-meter-wide buffer zone between Gaza and Egypt known as the Philadelphi Route was established. The international border along the Philadelphi corridor between Egypt and Gaza is 11 kilometres (7 miles) long.

== 1987: First Intifada ==
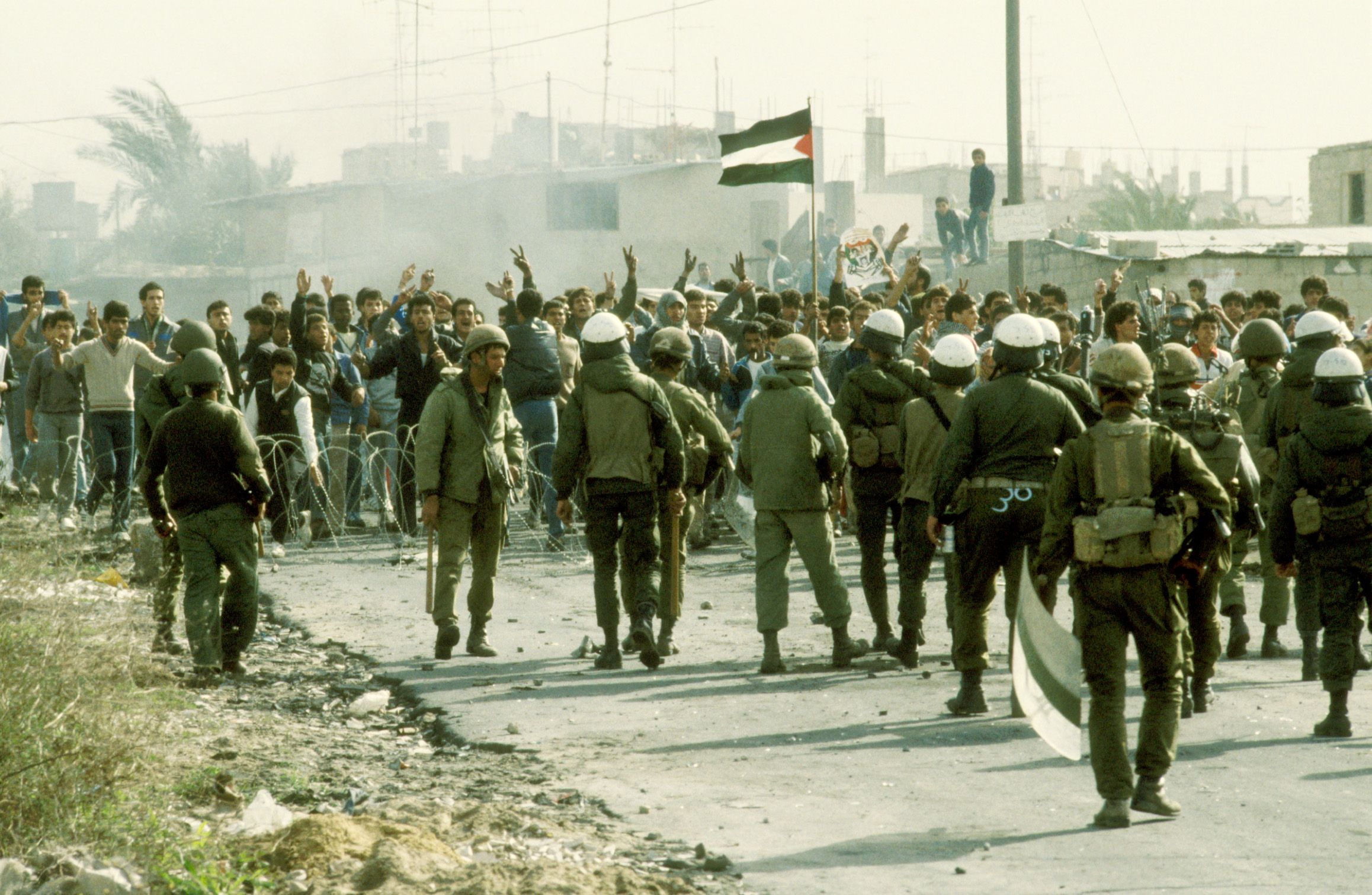
Israeli soldiers opposite Palestinian protesters in the strip during the First Intifada in 1987

The First Intifada was a sustained series of protests and violent riots carried out by Palestinians in the Israeli-occupied Palestinian territories and Israel. It was motivated by collective Palestinian frustration over Israel's military occupation of the West Bank and the Gaza Strip, as it approached a twenty-year mark, having begun after Israel's victory in the 1967 Arab–Israeli War. The uprising lasted from December 1987 until the Madrid Conference of 1991, though some date its conclusion to 1993, with the signing of the Oslo Accords.

The intifada began on 9 December 1987, in the Jabalia refugee camp of the Gaza Strip after an Israeli army truck collided with a civilian car, killing four Palestinian workers. Palestinians charged that the collision was a deliberate response for the killing of an Israeli in Gaza days earlier. Israel denied that the crash, which came at time of heightened tensions, was intentional or coordinated. The Palestinian response was characterized by protests, civil disobedience, and violence. There was graffiti, barricading, and widespread throwing of stones and Molotov cocktails at the IDF and its infrastructure within the West Bank and Gaza Strip. These contrasted with civil efforts including general strikes, boycotts of Israeli Civil Administration institutions in the Gaza Strip and the West Bank, an economic boycott consisting of refusal to work in Israeli settlements on Israeli products, refusal to pay taxes, and refusal to drive Palestinian cars with Israeli licenses.

== 1994: Gaza under Palestinian Authority ==
In May 1994, following the Palestinian-Israeli agreements known as the Oslo Accords, a phased transfer of governmental authority to the Palestinians took place. Much of the Strip came under Palestinian control, except for the settlement blocs and military areas. The Israeli forces left Gaza City and other urban areas, leaving the new Palestinian Authority to administer and police those areas. The Palestinian Authority, led by Yasser Arafat, chose Gaza City as its first provincial headquarters. In September 1995, Israel and the Palestine Liberation Organization (PLO) signed a second agreement, extending the Palestinian Authority to most West Bank towns.

Between 1994 and 1996, Israel built the Gaza–Israel barrier to improve security in Israel. The barrier was largely torn down by Palestinians at the beginning of the Second Intifada in September 2000.

== 2000: Second Intifada ==
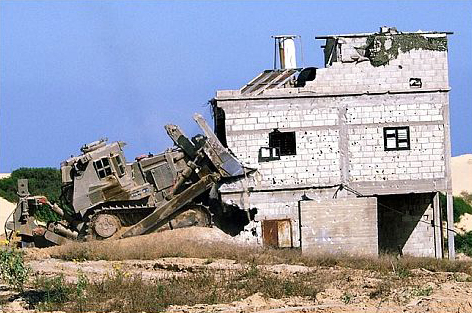
An IDF Caterpillar D9 armored bulldozer demolishing a house in the Gaza Strip during the Second Intifada

The Second Intifada was a major Palestinian uprising in the Israeli-occupied Palestinian territories and Israel. The general triggers for the unrest are speculated to have been centred on the failure of the 2000 Camp David Summit, which was expected to reach a final agreement on the Israeli–Palestinian peace process in July 2000. Outbreaks of violence began in September 2000, after Ariel Sharon, then the Israeli opposition leader, made a provocative visit to the Al-Aqsa compound on the Temple Mount in Jerusalem; the visit itself was peaceful, but, as anticipated, sparked protests and riots that Israeli police put down with rubber bullets and tear gas. The Second Intifada also marked the beginning of rocket attacks and bombings of Israeli border localities by Palestinian guerrillas from the Gaza Strip, especially by the Hamas and Palestinian Islamic Jihad movements.

High numbers of casualties were caused among civilians as well as combatants. Israeli forces engaged in gunfire, targeted killings, and tank and aerial attacks, while Palestinians engaged in suicide bombings, gunfire, stone-throwing, and rocket attacks. Palestinian suicide bombings were a prominent feature of the fighting and mainly targeted Israeli civilians, contrasting with the relatively less violent nature of the First Intifada. With a combined casualty figure for combatants and civilians, the violence is estimated to have resulted in the deaths of approximately 3,000 Palestinians and 1,000 Israelis, as well as 64 foreigners.

Between December 2000 and June 2001, the barrier between Gaza and Israel was reconstructed. A barrier on the Gaza Strip-Egypt border was constructed starting in 2004. The main crossing points are the northern Erez Crossing into Israel and the southern Rafah Crossing into Egypt. The eastern Karni Crossing used for cargo, closed down in 2011. Israel controls the Gaza Strip's northern borders, as well as its territorial waters and airspace. Egypt controls Gaza Strip's southern border, under an agreement between it and Israel. Neither Israel or Egypt permits free travel from Gaza as both borders are heavily militarily fortified. "Egypt maintains a strict blockade on Gaza in order to isolate Hamas from Islamist insurgents in the Sinai."

== 2005: Israel's unilateral disengagement ==
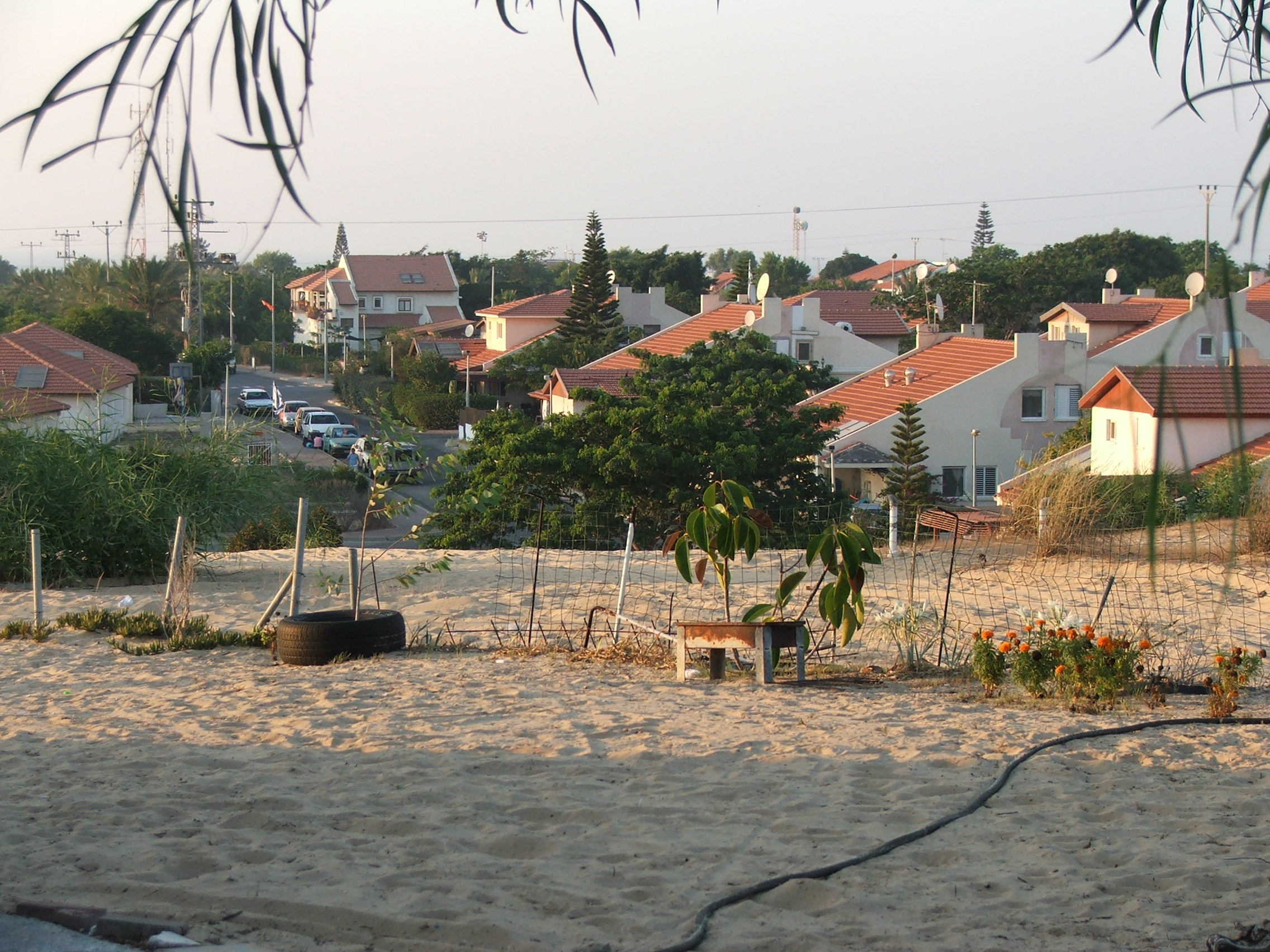
Neve Dekalim was Gush Katif's urban center and its largest community

In 2005, Israel withdrew from the Gaza Strip and dismantled its settlements. Israel also withdrew from the Philadelphi Route, a narrow strip of land adjacent to the border with Egypt, after Egypt agreed to secure its side of the border after the Agreement on Movement and Access, known as the Rafah Agreement. The Gaza Strip was left under the control of the Palestinian Authority.

== 2006: Hamas takeover ==
In the Palestinian parliamentary elections held on 25 January 2006, Hamas won a plurality of 42.9% of the total vote and 74 out of 132 total seats (56%). When Hamas assumed power the next month, Israel, the United States, the EU, Russia and the UN demanded that Hamas accept all previous agreements, recognize Israel's right to exist, and renounce violence; when Hamas refused, they cut off direct aid to the Palestinian Authority, although some aid money was redirected to humanitarian organizations not affiliated with the government. The resulting political disorder and economic stagnation led to many Palestinians emigrating from the Gaza Strip.

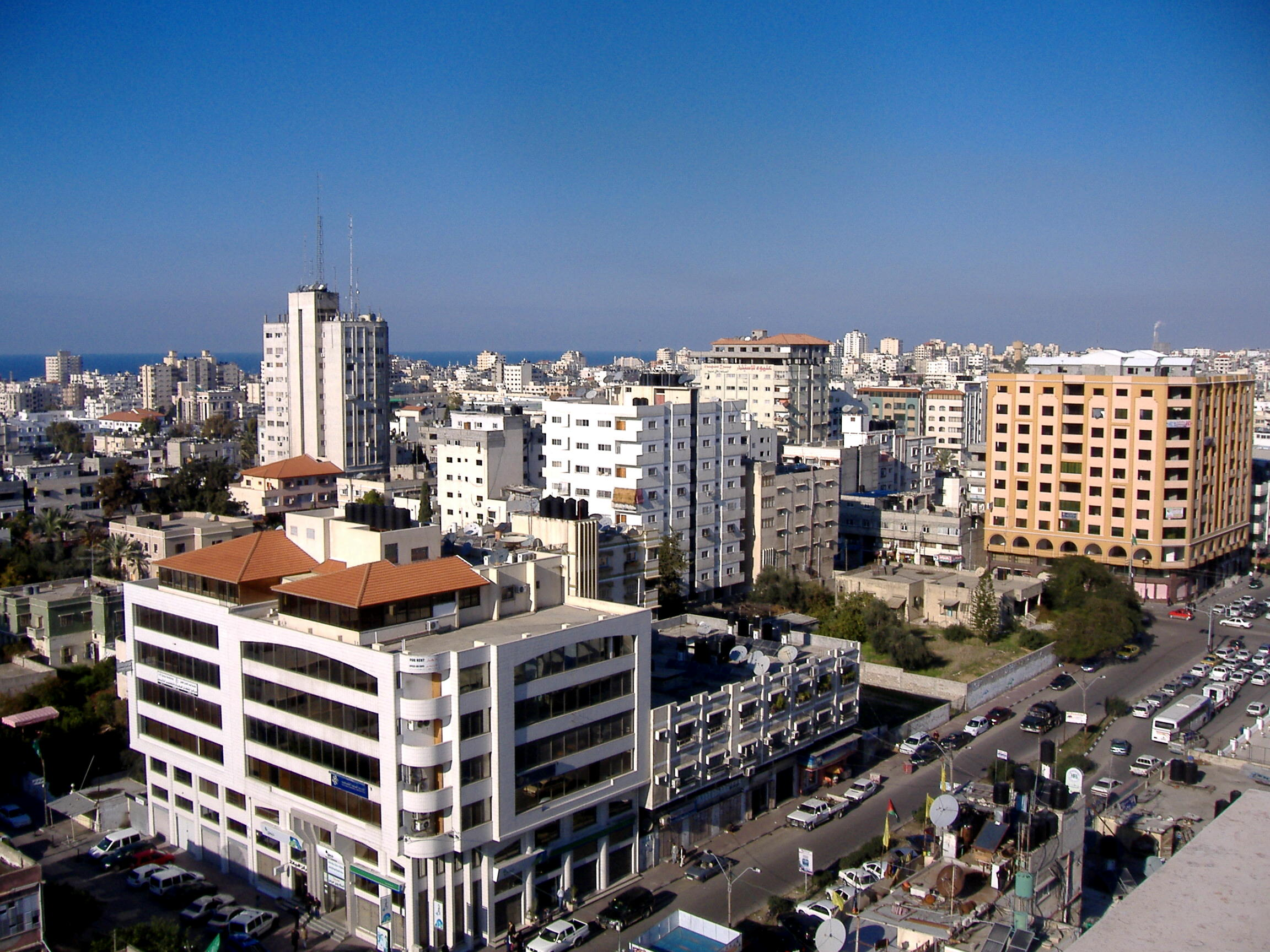
Gaza City skyline, 2007

In January 2007, fighting erupted between Hamas and Fatah. The deadliest clashes occurred in the northern Gaza Strip. On 30 January 2007, a truce was negotiated between Fatah and Hamas. After a few days, new fighting broke out. On 1 February, Hamas killed 6 people in an ambush on a Gaza convoy which delivered equipment for Abbas' Palestinian Presidential Guard. Fatah fighters stormed a Hamas-affiliated university in the Gaza Strip. Officers from Abbas' presidential guard battled Hamas gunmen guarding the Hamas-led Interior Ministry. In May 2007, new fighting broke out between the factions. Interior Minister Hani Qawasmi, who had been considered a moderate civil servant acceptable to both factions, resigned due to what he termed harmful behavior by both sides.

Fighting spread in the Gaza Strip, with both factions attacking vehicles and facilities of the other side. Following a breakdown in an Egyptian-brokered truce, Israel launched an air strike which destroyed a building used by Hamas. Ongoing violence prompted fear that it could bring the end of the Fatah-Hamas coalition government, and possibly the end of the Palestinian authority. Hamas spokesman Mousa Abu Marzook blamed the conflict between Hamas and Fatah on Israel, stating that the constant pressure of economic sanctions resulted in the "real explosion." From 2006 to 2007 more than 600 Palestinians were killed in fighting between Hamas and Fatah. 349 Palestinians were killed in fighting between factions in 2007. 160 Palestinians killed each other in June alone.

== 2007: Fatah–Hamas conflict ==
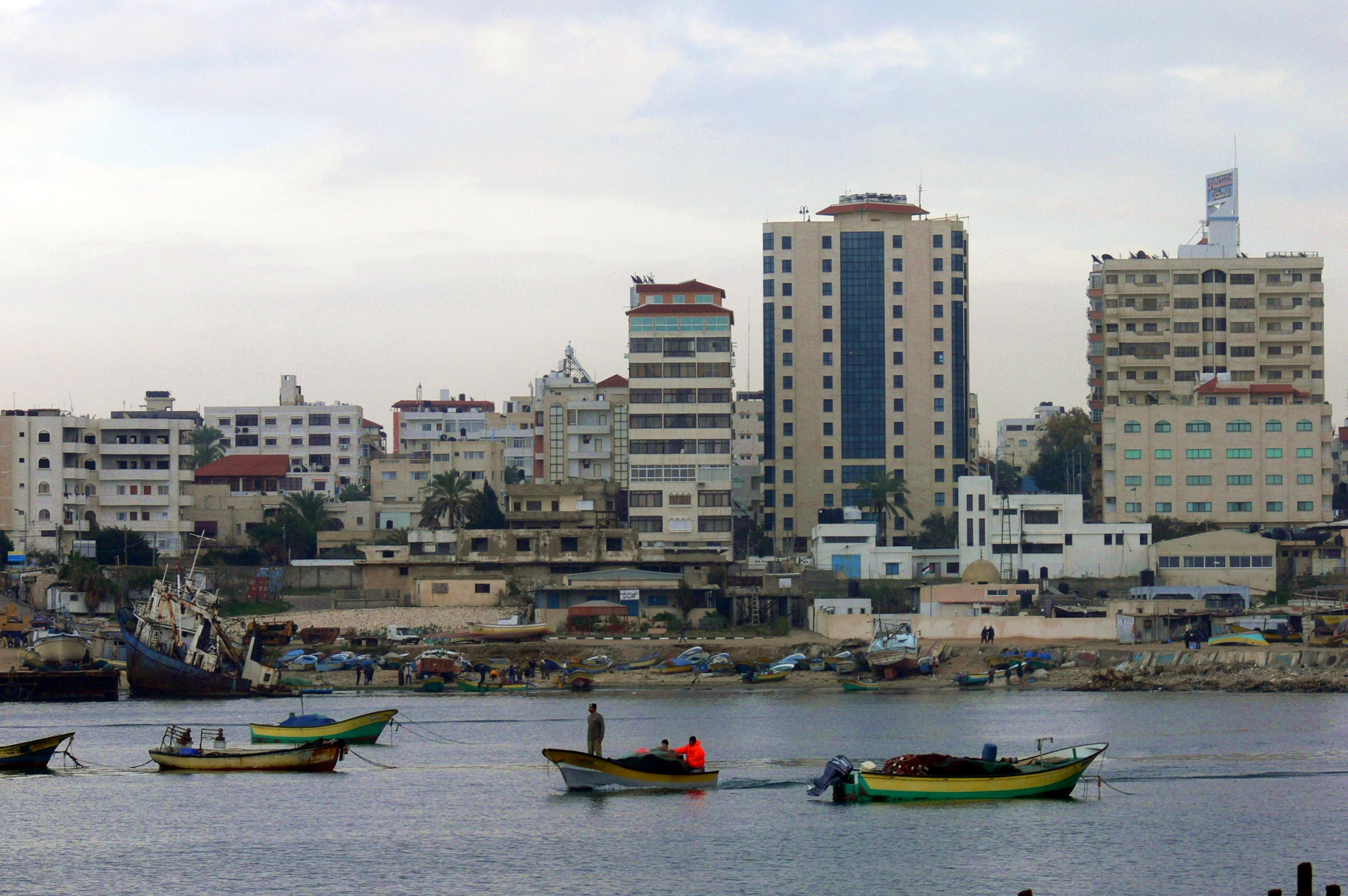
Gaza City in 2007

Following the victory of Hamas in the 2006 Palestinian legislative election, Hamas and Fatah formed the Palestinian authority national unity government headed by Ismail Haniyeh. Shortly after, Hamas took control of the Gaza Strip in the course of the Battle of Gaza (June 2007), seizing government institutions and replacing Fatah and other government officials with its own. By 14 June, Hamas fully controlled the Gaza Strip. Palestinian president Mahmoud Abbas responded by declaring a state of emergency, dissolving the unity government and forming a new government without Hamas participation. PNA security forces in the West Bank arrested a number of Hamas members.

In late June 2008, Egypt, Saudi Arabia and Jordan declared the West Bank-based cabinet formed by Abbas as "the sole legitimate Palestinian government". Egypt moved its embassy from Gaza to the West Bank. Saudi Arabia and Egypt supported reconciliation and a new unity government and pressed Abbas to start talks with Hamas. Abbas had always conditioned this on Hamas returning control of the Gaza Strip to the Palestinian Authority. After the takeover, Israel and Egypt closed their border crossings with Gaza. Palestinian sources reported that European Union monitors fled the Rafah Border Crossing, on the Gaza–Egypt border for fear of being kidnapped or harmed. Arab foreign ministers and Palestinian officials presented a united front against control of the border by Hamas. Meanwhile, Israeli and Egyptian security reports said that Hamas continued smuggling in large quantities of explosives and arms from Egypt through tunnels. Egyptian security forces uncovered 60 tunnels in 2007.

=== Egyptian border barrier breach ===
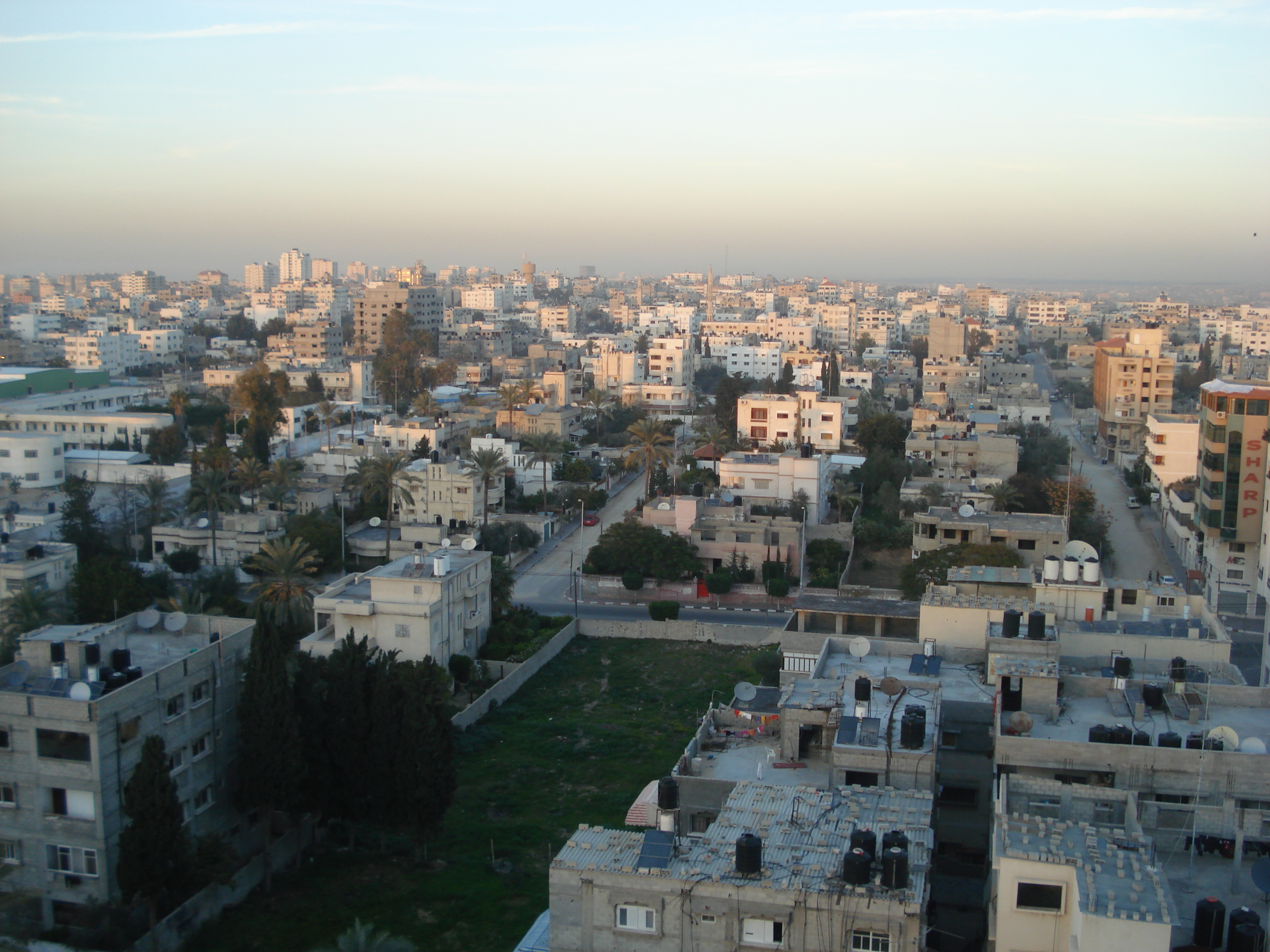
Gaza in January 2009

On 23 January 2008, after months of preparation during which the steel reinforcement of the border barrier was weakened, Hamas destroyed several parts of the wall dividing Gaza and Egypt in the town of Rafah. Hundreds of thousands of Gazans crossed the border into Egypt seeking food and supplies. Due to the crisis, Egyptian president Hosni Mubarak ordered his troops to allow the Palestinians in but to verify that they did not bring weapons back across the border. Egypt arrested and later released several armed Hamas militants in the Sinai who presumably wanted to infiltrate into Israel. At the same time, Israel increased its state of alert along the length of the Israel–Egypt Sinai border, and warned its citizens to leave Sinai "without delay."

In February 2008, the Gaza–Israel conflict intensified, with rockets launched at Israeli cities. Aggression by Hamas led to Israeli military action on 29 February 2008, resulting in over 110 Palestinians being killed according to BBC News, as well as 2 Israeli soldiers. Israeli human rights group B'Tselem estimated that 45 of those killed were not involved in hostilities, and 15 were minors.

== 2008–2009: Gaza War ==
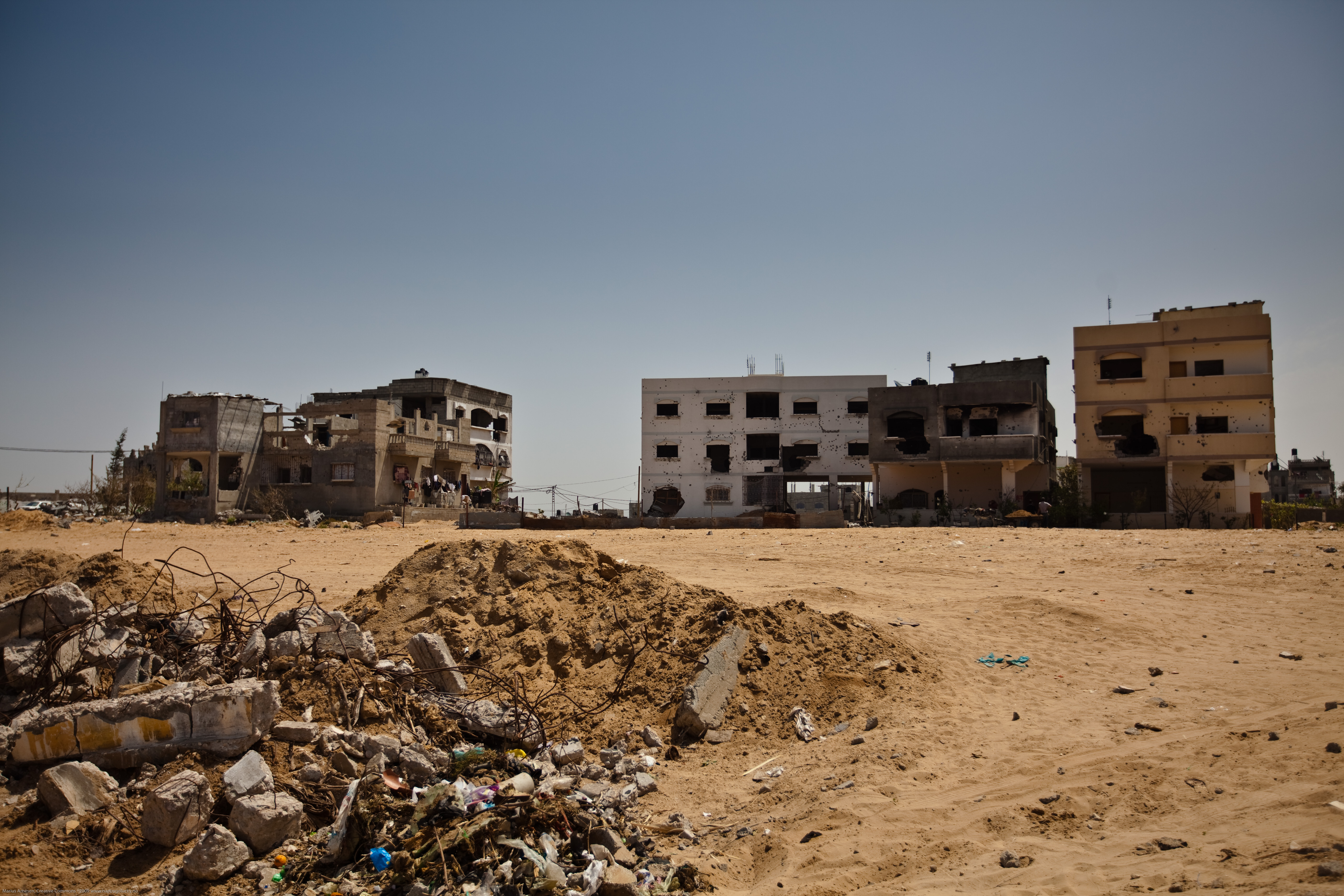
Buildings damaged during the 2008-2009 Gaza war

On 27 December 2008, Israeli F-16 fighters launched a series of air strikes against targets in Gaza, breaking its temporary truce with Hamas, which was attempted to be renewed after Israel earlier violated its ceasefire with Hamas. Israel began a ground invasion of the Gaza Strip on 3 January 2009. Various sites that Israel claimed were being used as weapons depots were struck from the air : police stations, schools, hospitals, UN warehouses, mosques, various Hamas government buildings and other buildings.

Israel said that the attack was a response to Hamas rocket attacks on southern Israel, which totaled over 3,000 in 2008, and which intensified during the few weeks preceding the operation. Israel advised people near military targets to leave before the attacks. Israeli defense sources said that Defense Minister Ehud Barak instructed the IDF to prepare for the operation six months before it began, using long-term planning and intelligence-gathering.

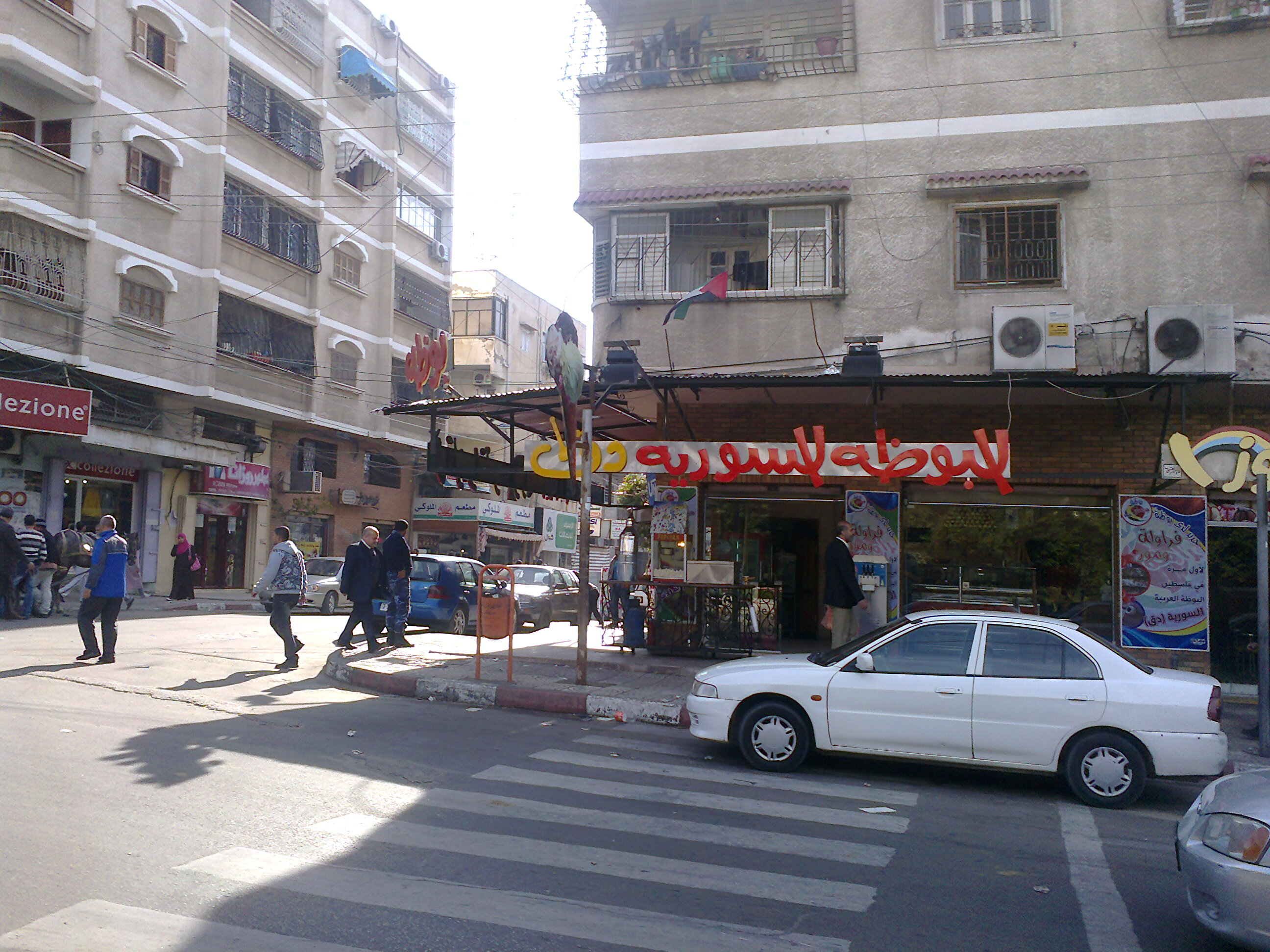
Gaza City in 2012

A total of 1,100–1,400 Palestinians (295–926 civilians) and 13 Israelis were killed in the 22-day war. The conflict damaged or destroyed tens of thousands of homes, 15 of Gaza's 27 hospitals and 43 of its 110 primary health care facilities, 800 water wells, 186 greenhouses, and nearly all of its 10,000 family farms; leaving 50,000 homeless, 400,000–500,000 without running water, one million without electricity, and resulting in acute food shortages. The people of Gaza still suffer from the loss of these facilities and homes, especially since they have great challenges to rebuild them.

== 2014: Gaza War ==
On 5 June 2014, Fatah signed a unity agreement with the Hamas political party.

The 2014 Gaza War, also known as Operation Protective Edge, was a military operation launched by Israel on 8 July 2014 in the Gaza Strip. Following the kidnapping and murder of three Israeli teenagers in the West Bank by Hamas-affiliated Palestinian militants, the IDF initiated Operation Brother's Keeper, in which some 350 Palestinians, including nearly all of the active Hamas militants in the West Bank, were arrested. Hamas subsequently fired a greater number of rockets into Israel from Gaza, triggering a seven-week-long conflict between the two sides. It was one of the deadliest outbreaks of open conflict between Israel and the Palestinians in decades. The combination of Palestinian rocket attacks and Israeli airstrikes resulted in thousands of deaths, the vast majority of which were Gazan Palestinians.

== 2018–2019: Great March of Return ==
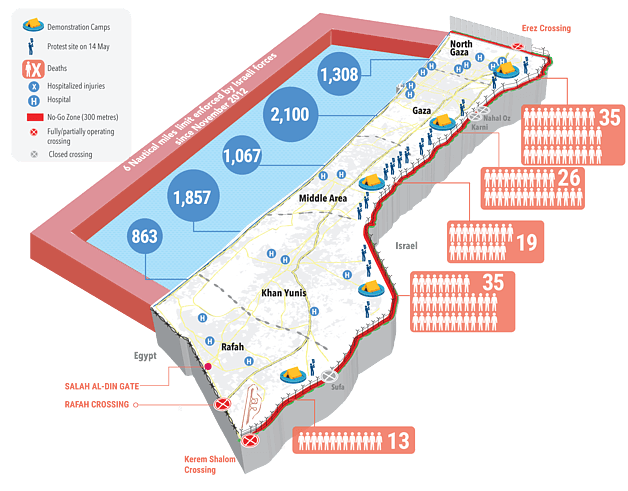
UN OCHA map of the Great March of Return protests, 31 May 2018

In 2018–2019, a series of protests, also known as the Great March of Return, were held each Friday in the Gaza Strip near the Israel–Gaza barrier from 30 March 2018 until 27 December 2019, during which a total of 223 Palestinians were killed by Israeli forces. The demonstrators demanded that the Palestinian refugees must be allowed to return to lands they were displaced from in what is now Israel. They protested against Israel's land, air and sea blockade of the Gaza Strip and the United States recognition of Jerusalem as capital of Israel.

Most of the demonstrators demonstrated peacefully far from the border fence. Peter Cammack, a fellow with the Middle East Program at the Carnegie Endowment for International Peace, argued that the march indicated a new trend in Palestinian society and Hamas, with a shift away from violence towards non-violent forms of protest. Some demonstrators were setting tires on fire and launching Molotov cocktails and rocks toward the troops on the opposite side of the border. Israeli officials said the demonstrations were used by Hamas as cover for launching attacks against Israel.

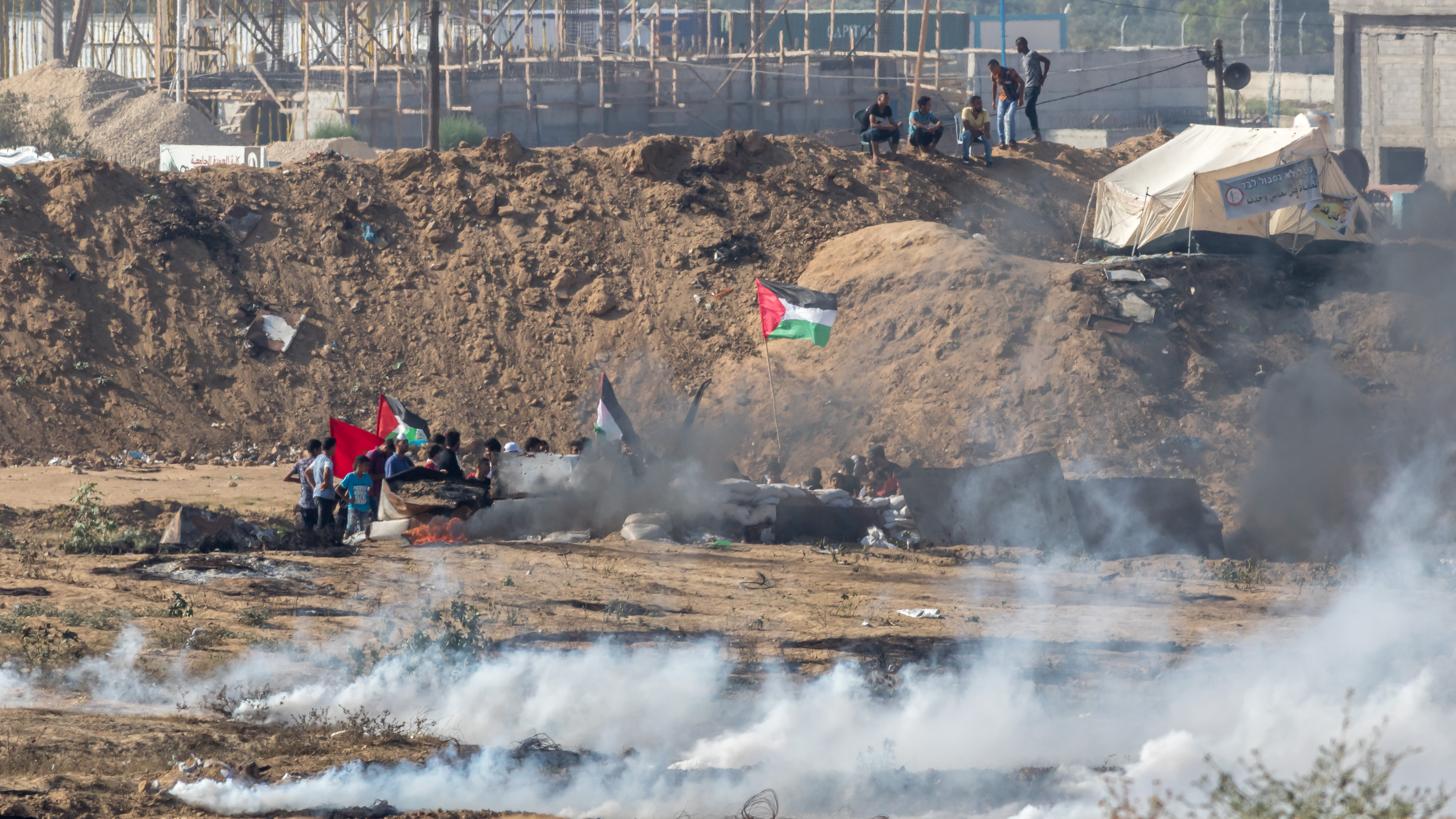
2018 Gaza border protests, Bureij refugee camp in Gaza

In late February 2019, a United Nations Human Rights Council's independent commission found that of the 489 cases of Palestinian deaths or injuries analyzed, only two were possibly justified as responses to danger by Israeli security forces. The commission deemed the rest of the cases illegal, and concluded with a recommendation calling on Israel to examine whether war crimes or crimes against humanity had been committed, and if so, to bring those responsible to trial.

On 28 February 2019, the Commission said it had "'reasonable grounds' to believe Israeli soldiers may have committed war crimes and shot at journalists, health workers and children during protests in Gaza in 2018." Israel refused to take part in the inquiry and rejected the report.

== 2021: Israel–Palestine crisis ==
Before the 2021 Israel–Palestine crisis, Gaza had 48% unemployment and half of the population lived in poverty. During the crisis, 66 children died (551 children in the previous conflict). On 13 June 2021, a high level World Bank delegation visited Gaza to witness the damage. Mobilization with UN and EU partners is ongoing to finalize a needs assessment in support of Gaza's reconstruction and recovery.

Another escalation between 5 and 8 August 2022 resulted in property damage and displacement of people as a result of airstrikes.

== 2023–2025: Gaza war ==
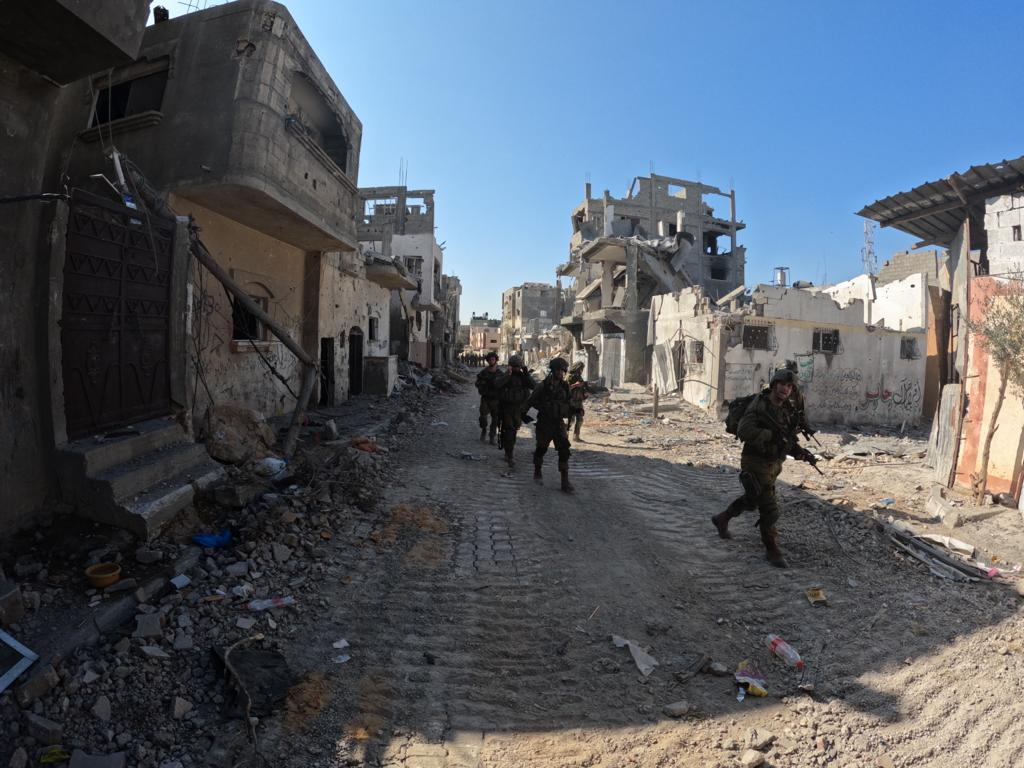
Israeli soldiers in the Gaza Strip on 31 October 2023

On 7 October 2023, the paramilitaries in Gaza, led by the Hamas's Al-Qassam Brigades, invaded southwest Israel, targeting Israeli communities and military bases, killing at least 1,300 people and taking at least 236 hostages. On 9 October 2023, Israel declared war on Hamas and imposed a "total blockade" of the Gaza Strip, with Israeli defense minister Yoav Gallant declaring, "There will be no electricity, no food, no fuel, everything is closed. We are fighting human animals and we are acting accordingly." Gallant changed his position after pressure from US president Joe Biden, and a deal was made on 19 October for Israel and Egypt to allow aid into Gaza.

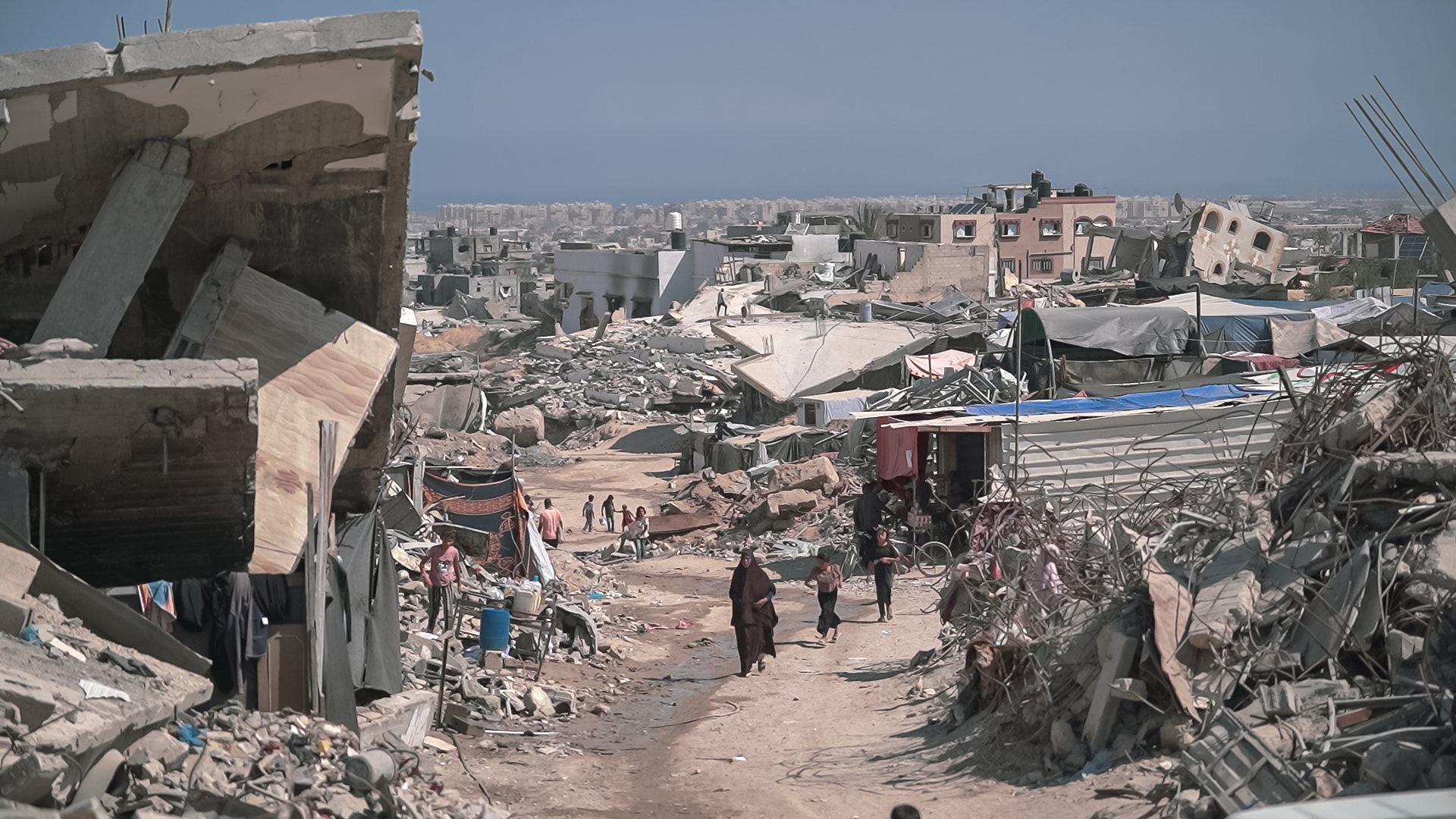
The ruins of Gaza after Israeli airstrikes

After the outbreak of the Gaza war in 2023, there has been a renewed campaign to return Israeli settlers to Gush Katif, including Hanan Ben Ari singing "We return to Gush Katif" to Israeli troops. On 19 January 2025, a ceasefire between Israel and Hamas took effect. It lasted until 18 March, when Israel launched a surprise attack.

On 5 February 2025, in a joint press conference with Benjamin Netanyahu, US president Donald Trump asserted that the US would "take over the Gaza Strip, we'll own it." The remark sparked discussions regarding US policy in the region. The following day, Trump said the proposed transfer of Gaza would happen after the conclusion of the war and the resettlement of population elsewhere.

The Gaza war has caused widespread destruction, a humanitarian crisis, and an ongoing famine in the Gaza Strip. Most of the population was forcibly displaced. Several human rights organizations such as Amnesty International and B'Tselem, various genocide studies and international law scholars, and other experts say that a genocide is taking place in Gaza, although some dispute this. In September 2025 a United Nations commission of inquiry concluded that there are reasonable grounds to conclude that four of the five genocidal acts defined under international law have been carried by Israel against Palestinians in Gaza. Since the start of the war, over 60,000 Palestinians in Gaza have been killed, almost half of them women and children, and more than 148,000 injured. A study in The Lancet estimated 64,260 deaths in Gaza from traumatic injuries by June 2024, while noting a potentially larger death toll when "indirect" deaths are included. As of May 2025, a comparable figure for traumatic injury deaths would be 93,000 (77,000 to 109,000), representing 4–5% of Gaza's pre-war population.

== 2025–present: Gaza peace plan and Resolution 2803 ==
In October 2025, Israel and Hamas accepted the first phase of the Gaza peace plan resulting in the cessation of hostilities in the Gaza War and a partial Israeli withdrawal from the Gaza Strip. In the second phase of the plan it is envisioned that an International Stabilization Force be deployed in the Gaza Strip and a Board of Peace and National Committee for the Administration of Gaza be established to administer the Gaza Strip for a transitional period, before turning over governance to a reformed Palestinian Authority.

== See also ==
- List of archaeological sites in the Gaza Strip

== Sources ==
- Byman, Daniel (2011). A high price: the triumphs and failures of Israeli counterterrorism. New York: Oxford University Press. pp. 114–. ISBN 978-0-19-539182-4. Archived from the original on 18 November 2021.
- Filiu, Jean-Pierre (2014). Gaza: A History. Oxford University Press. ISBN 978-0-190-20191-3. Archived from the original on 28 February 2023.
- Pressman, Jeremy (2003). "The Second Intifada: Background and Causes of the Israeli-Palestinian Conflict". Journal of Conflict Studies. 23 (2). ISSN 1715-5673. Archived from the original on 1 November 2020.
- Varble, Derek (2003). The Suez crisis, 1956. Essential histories. Oxford: Osprey Publishing. ISBN 978-1-84176-418-4.
