= Raghib al-Alami =

Mayor of Gaza City, 1965–1970

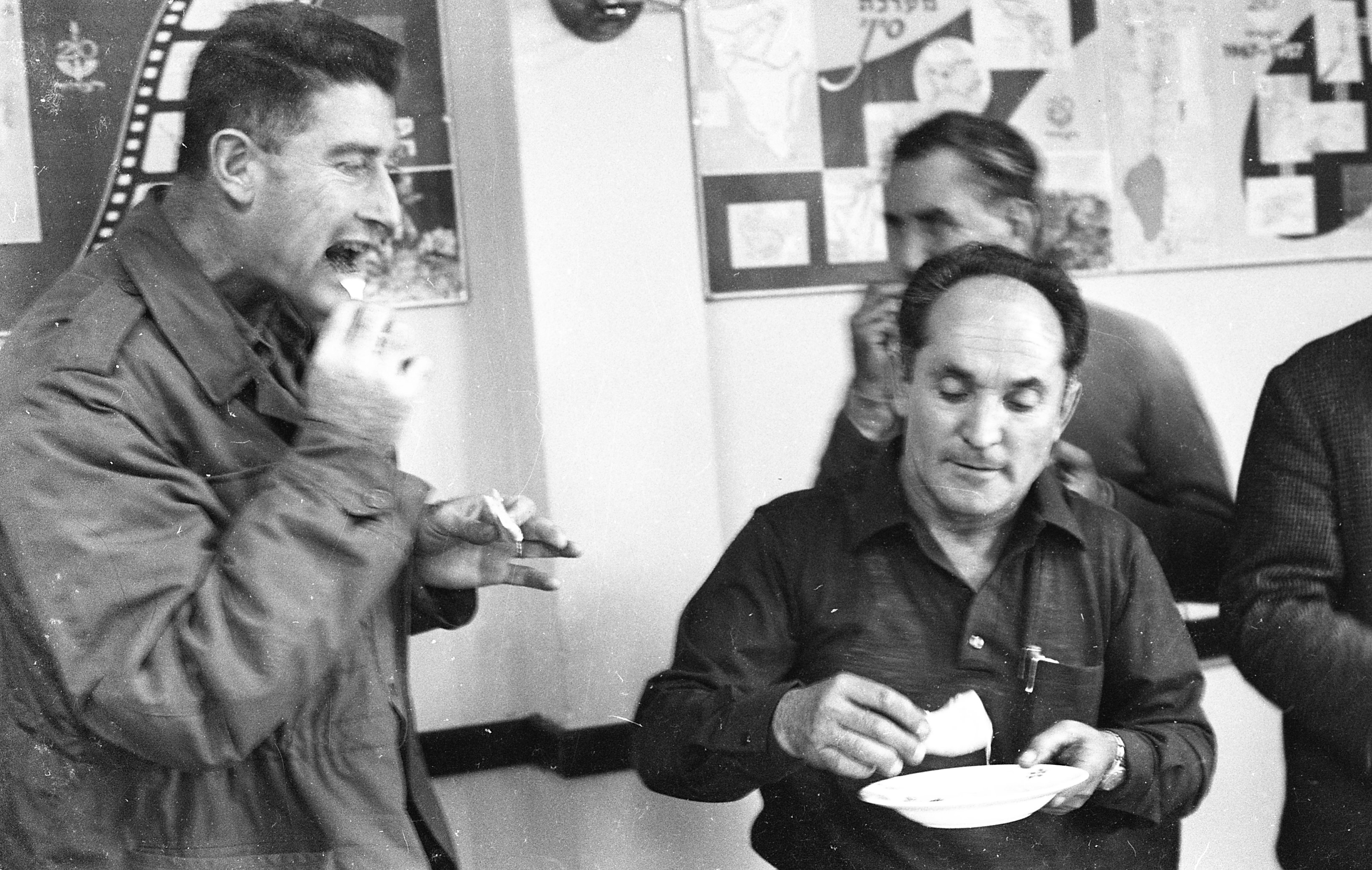

Mayor of Gaza City
- In office 1965–1970
- Appointed by: Egyptian government
- Succeeded by: Rashad al-Shawa

Raghib al-Alami was the mayor of Gaza City between 1965 and 1970. He was appointed by the Egyptian government while the Gaza Strip was under Egyptian control. He served office when Israel occupied Gaza during the 1967 Six-Day War with Egypt.

Alami maintained a policy of not entering Israel proper after Gaza was occupied, but entered on 11 January 1970 to petition the Israeli authorities to discontinue the practice of destroying Palestinian houses in retaliation for Palestinian fedayeen attacks. During his time in office, his son was imprisoned by the Israeli authorities and his car, truck, factory and citrus trees had been confiscated because he refused to make a deal with Israel on Gaza's electricity. After Alami challenged Israel's move to connect the Gaza Strip to Israel's electricity grid, he was dismissed from the municipality. He was replaced by an Israeli military officer until Israel appointed Rashad al-Shawa mayor of Gaza.

== Bibliography ==
- Gordon, Neve (2008), Israel's Occupation, University of California Press, ISBN 9780520942363
- Institute for Palestine Studies (1970), The Arabs Under Israeli Occupation, Institute for Palestine Studies
- Nakhleh, Emile A. (1979), The West Bank and Gaza: Toward the Making of a Palestinian State, American Enterprise Institute for Public Policy Research, ISBN 9780844733357
