= Mayor of Gaza City =

Head of the government of Gaza City

- رئيس بلدية غزة (Arabic)
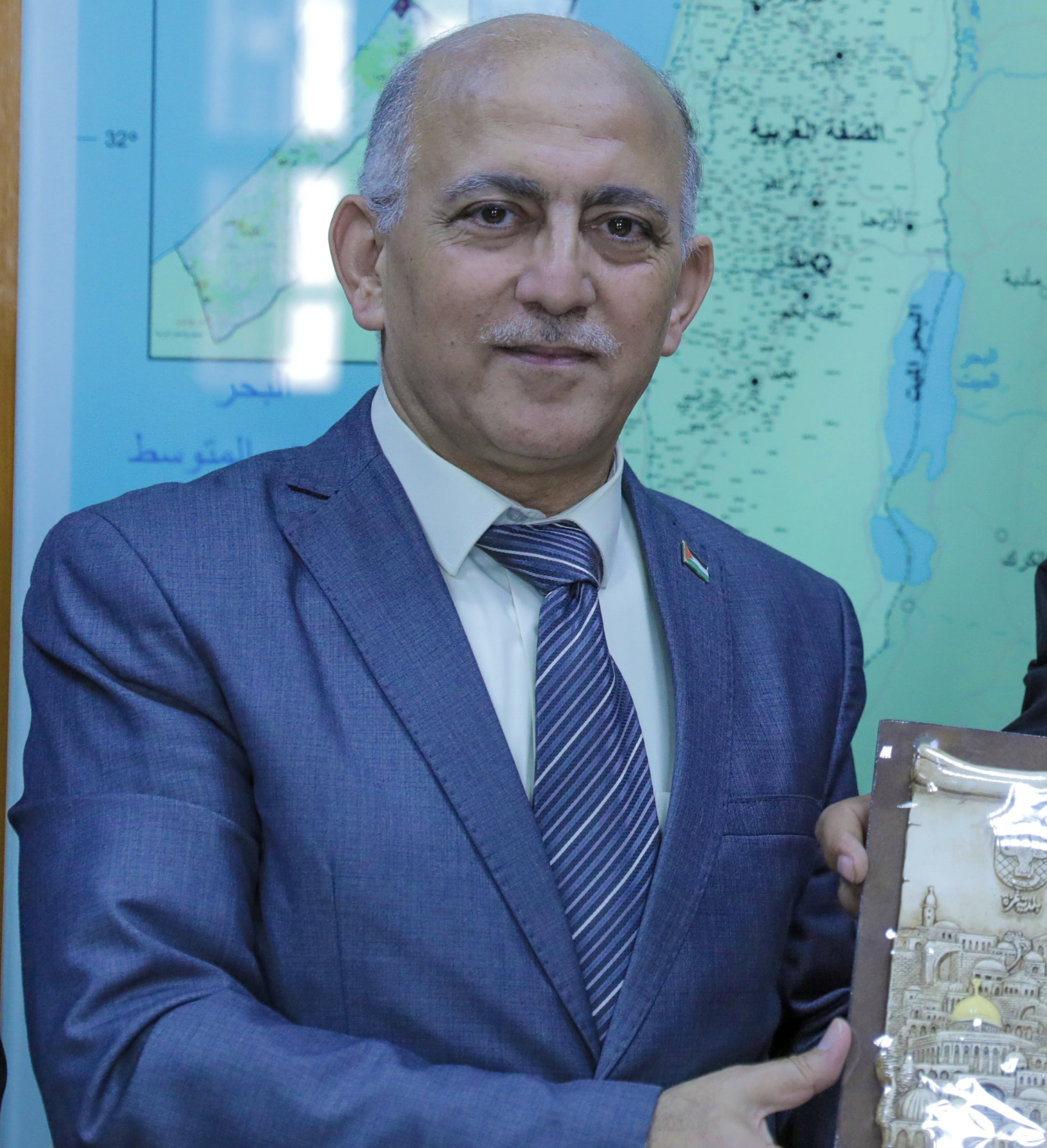
- Incumbent; Yahya Al-Sarraj since 2019
- Type: Head of government
- Formation: 1906
- First holder: Sa'id al-Shawwa
- Website: www.mogaza.org

The mayor of Gaza City (Arabic: رئيس بلدية غزة, romanized: rayiys baladiat ghaza) is the head of government of Gaza City.

== History ==
=== Ottoman Palestine ===
Although the first municipal council of Gaza was formed in 1893 under the chairmanship of Ali Khalil Shawa, modern mayorship began in 1906 with his son Said al-Shawa, who was appointed mayor by Ottoman authorities. During his reign as mayor, he built a hospital, several mosques and schools in Gaza, and is credited with introducing the modern plow to the city in 1911. Al-Shawa developed close relationships with the Ottoman Army during World War I and was awarded honorary decorations by the Ottoman authorities. His sympathy with the Ottomans during the war caused the victorious British Army to depose him in 1917.

=== British Mandate ===
In 1927, Fahmi al-Husseini, a political ally of the Nashashibi family, was elected mayor of Gaza on May 5, 1928. In 1930, a number of Gaza notables, mostly members of the city's municipal council, complained to the high commissioner of Palestine about al-Husseini. They were angered at the decision to allow al-Husseini to maintain his legal practice while he served as Gaza's mayor, stating he was occupied with his own private business "to an extent as to neglect the interests of the town [Gaza] which is more needy of organization than any in this country." However, during his tenure, Gaza was extended to the coast (Rimal district), the local hospital and market were completed, the streets were widened, and the city received electricity in 1938 in cooperation with the Palestinian Electricity Company. Al-Husseini also oversaw the establishment of the municipal hall of Gaza along Omar Mukhtar Street. In addition to the latter street—which he named after the Libyan revolutionary Omar Mukhtar—he also named several other new streets in Gaza including Imam Shafi'i Street, Firas Street, and Jamal Fahmi Pasha Street. In 1938, during the Arab revolt in Palestine, British authorities arrested al-Husseini on being part of anti-British leadership and stripped him of his post as mayor.

Rushdi al-Shawwa then replaced al-Husseini as mayor, and started to rebuild city infrastructure during his term. He started building asphalt roads, dug Bir as-Safa (as-Safa water well)—the first water well equipped with a pump and engine in Gaza—and started distributing water to houses through a water pipe system. He also started the first sewage draining system and provided electricity as well as many other services for the citizens of Gaza. He built the as-Shuja'iyya School, az-Zaytoon School, Salahuddin School, and was the head of the founding committee that built the Palestine High School. He also participated in formal networks with other Arab mayors across Palestine, such as at the Fourth Conference of the Arab Mayors of Palestine hosted in Gaza in 1945.

=== Arab control ===
When the British Mandate over Palestine ended on 15 May 1948, Rushdi and along with other Arab mayors in Palestine were awarded the Order of the British Empire Medallion (OBE) by King George VI. As British troops left that day, Rushdi flew the flag of Palestine over the municipal headquarters (as-Saraya) in Gaza upon the departure of the last British soldier from the city that same day. Rushdi was elected mayor of Gaza more than once, serving for four terms, and was the last mayor elected for Gaza. Since 1946, no elections have been held for the municipality of Gaza.

=== Israeli military government ===
In 1971, Israel appointed Rashad al-Shawwa as mayor of Gaza. He took over responsibility for the management of the municipality and made the decision to not annex adjacent Palestinian refugee camps to the city such as al-Shati and Jabalia. He commenced the development of the economic sector in the Gaza Strip, working on major projects for the export of locally grown citrus to the Arab world, and establishing a juice factory off Salah al-Din Street.

In 1972, Gaza's Israeli military governor dismissed the city's mayor for refusing to annex al-Shati camp to the municipality of Gaza. After a period of military rule, the Israeli government re-appointed Shawwa as Mayor of Gaza City in 1976.

In 1982, Israeli deposal of the Al-Bireh city council triggered the March 1982 Palestinian general strike across the region. Shawwa and the council then worked from home instead of working in the city hall building as a form of symbolic protest. Shawwa and the council had also refused to sign an order from the Israeli military forbidding them from making political statements. In July 1982, the Israeli government deposed Shawwa from his position as mayor of Gaza, along with the entire Gaza City council, accusing them of failing to cooperate with Israeli military rule of the Gaza Strip.

=== Palestinian Authority ===
In 1994, the Palestinian Authority was created under the Gaza–Jericho Agreement and given authority in the Gaza Strip. On 26 July 1994, Yasser Arafat appointed Aoun al-Shawwa to be mayor of Gaza based on his experience working in administration and economics in the Gulf States. He died on 30 November 2001, after serving for over 7 years.

=== Hamas rule ===
Following Hamas victory in the 2006 Palestinian legislative election and the subsequent Battle of Gaza, the Gaza Strip came under Hamas governance in June 2007.

On 22 March 2008, the Gaza Municipality Council appointed Rafiq al-Makki to be mayor amidst the Gaza Strip blockade. On 8 April 2014, the municipality council accepted al-Makki's resignation from his post as mayor.

In 2019, Yahya Al-Sarraj assumed the office of Mayor of Gaza after being selected by the city's Hamas-led administration. Fatah—the political party that dominates the Palestinian Authority in the West Bank—denounced the selection process, although it eventually reconciled with Al-Sarraj. At the handover ceremony, he listed internal affairs, service development, activating cultural centres, and focusing on development and investment as the four priorities of the city council under his leadership. He later announced that he was working on a campaign to get Gaza residents to sort their garbage, and was hoping that a private company could be found to recycle it.

After the 2021 conflict with Israel, Al-Sarraj announced the "We Will Rebuild It" campaign to fix damage caused by the war. He also called for the lifting of Israel's blockade on Gaza, which he blamed for the ongoing financial crisis in Gaza City. In June 2021, Al-Sarraj was honoured with the presentation of the "Shield of Loyalty" by Fatah's Democratic Reform Movement for his work and effectiveness on rebuilding Gaza.

== List ==
Mayor of Gaza (1906–present)

Political party: Independent Fatah Hamas

No.	Portrait	Name (birth–death)	Term of office			Political party	Election
No.	Portrait	Name (birth–death)	Took office	Left office	Time in office	Political party	Election
Gaza during Ottoman Palestine (1906–1917)
1		Sa'id al-Shawwa (1868–1930)	1906	1917	11 years	Independent	
Gaza during OETA and Mandatory Palestine (1918–1948)
2		Mahmoud Abu Khadra	1918	1924	6 years	Independent	
3		Omar Sourani (1885–1928)	1924	1928	4 years	Independent	
4		Fahmi al-Husseini (1886–1940)	5 May 1928	1939	11 years	Independent	
5		Rushdi al-Shawwa (1889–1965)	1939	1948	9 years	Independent	
Gaza during All-Palestine Protectorate and UAR control (1948–1967)
5		Rushdi al-Shawwa (1889–1965)	1948	1951	3 years	Independent	
6		Omar Sawan	1952	1955	3 years	Independent	
7		Munir al-Rayyes (Palestinian) (1916–1974)	5 March 1956	24 November 1956	264 days	Independent	
Office vacant due to Israeli occupation during the Suez Crisis
7		Munir al-Rayyes (Palestinian) (1916–1974)	23 September 1957	1965	8 years	Independent	
8		Raghib al-Alami	1965	June 1967	2 years	Independent	
Gaza during Israeli military and civil administration (1967–1994)
8		Raghib al-Alami	June 1967	January 1971	3 years, 7 months	Independent	
9		Rashad al-Shawwa (1909–1988)	January 1971	October 1972	1 year, 9 months	Independent	
N/A		Israeli military government	1972	1976	4 years	N/A	
9		Rashad al-Shawwa (1909–1988)	1976	1982	6 years	Independent	
10		Hamza al-Turkmani	1982	1994	12 years	Independent	
Gaza under Palestinian Authority (1994–2008)
11		Aoun al-Shawwa (1934–2001)	26 July 1994	30 November 2001	7 years, 127 days	Independent	
12		Nasri Khayal	November 2001	2002/October 2005	1 year	Independent	
-		Sayed al-Din Khurma (1954–2014); Acting	2002	2005	3 years	Independent	
13		Maged Abu Ramadan (1955–)	2005	2008	3 years	Independent	
Gaza under Hamas rule (2008–present)
14		Rafiq al-Makki (1959–)	March 2008	2014	6 years	Independent	
15		Nizar Hijazi	2014	2019	5 years	Independent	
16		Yahya Al-Sarraj (1962–)	2019	present	TBD	Independent	

== Bibliography ==
- Feldman, Ilana (2008). Governing Gaza: Bureaucracy, Authority, and the Work of Rule, 1917-1967. Duke University Press. ISBN 978-0-8223-4240-3.

== See also ==
- History of the Gaza Strip
- History of Gaza
