= Sa'id al-Shawwa =

Palestinian politician (1868–1930)

Hajj Sa'id al-Shawwa Effendi
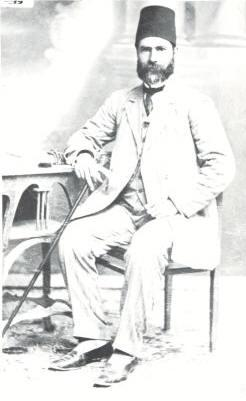
- Portrait of Shawwa as mayor of Gaza

Mayor of Gaza
- In office 1906–1917
- Preceded by: Mohammed Khalil al-Shawwa
- Succeeded by: Mahmoud Abu Khadra

Vice President of the Supreme Muslim Council
- In office 1919–1929

Personal details
- Born: c. 1868 Gaza, Mutassarifate of Jerusalem, Ottoman Empire
- Died: 25 October 1930 Gaza, British Mandate of Palestine
- Spouse: Shaath Kharma
- Children: Rushdi; Adel; Sa'di; Ezeddine; Rashad

Hajj Sa'id al-Shawwa (Arabic: الحـاج سعيد الشوا) (1868–October 1930) was a Palestinian Arab politician and the first mayor of Gaza, serving from 1906 to 1917. He was also one of the most influential members of the Supreme Muslim Council from 1921 until his death. He was an opponent of British mandatory rule in Palestine, supporting the Ottomans during World War I and later the nationalist Grand Mufti of Jerusalem, Amin al-Husayni.

== Biography ==
=== Early life and career ===
Al-Shawwa was born into the prominent Shawwa family of Gaza, and his father Mohammed Khalil Al-Shawwa served as the chairman of the Municipality of Gaza when it was founded in 1893. Before entering politics, Sa'id was involved in a career as a grain exporter.

=== Mayor of Gaza ===
In 1904, he was appointed a member of the municipal council and in 1906, he became the first Mayor of Gaza. During his reign as mayor he built a hospital, several mosques and schools in Gaza, and is credited with introducing the modern plow to the city in 1911. Al-Shawa developed close relationships with the Ottoman Army during World War I and was awarded honorary decorations by the Ottoman authorities. His sympathy with the Ottomans during the war caused the victorious British Army to depose him in 1917.

=== Activity with Supreme Muslim Council ===
Al-Shawwa represented Gaza at the first, fourth and fifth Palestinian National Congress held in 1919, 1920 and 1922. In 1921, shortly after the founding of the Supreme Muslim Council, al-Shawwa was elected as one of the four members of the council's electoral college—the highest-ranking body. He was chosen to represent the Gaza, southern Palestine, and the District of Jerusalem from 1922 to 1929. By then, al-Shawwa was a major landowner in Gaza, as well as Beersheba, owning a total of roughly 50,000 dunams. In 1926–27, he took charge in the restoration of the Great Mosque of Gaza after it was mostly destroyed by British bombardment during the World War.

=== Death ===
Al-Shawwa died in 1930 and was replaced Muhi ad-Din 'Abd al-Shafi, a Muslim scholar and opponent of al-Husayni.

== Dār al-Shawwā (Ash-Shawwa House) ==
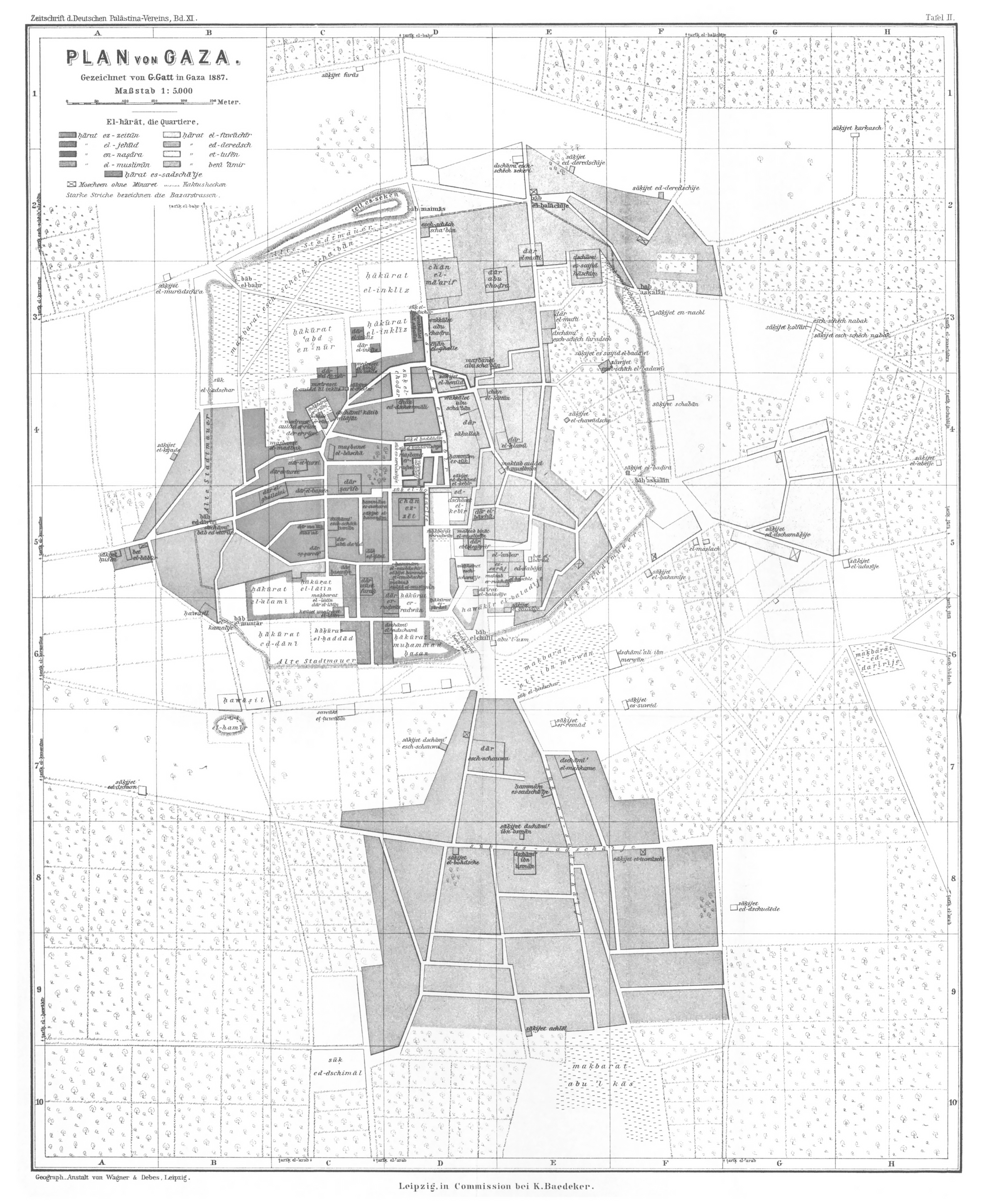
Georg Gatt's 1887-88 map of Gaza City

Al-Shawwa's home in Gaza City was included in an 1887 map created by the missionary Georg Gatt. It was also registered in the Ottoman Census of 1905 with a total of 13 household members. The entry states: "Ḥājj Saʿīd Efendi al-Shawwā, born in Gaza, real estate owner (emlak sahibi), born 1283/1866-7, of middle height, brown eyes, brown skin colour, of good health."

According to UNESCO, Al-Shawwa's home was destroyed in the Israel-Hamas War.

== Bibliography ==
- Kupferschmidt, Uri (1987), The Supreme Muslim Council: Islam Under the British Mandate for Palestine, BRILL, ISBN 90-04-07929-7
