= Fahmi al-Husseini =

Palestinian Arab politician

Fahmi Bey al-Husseini
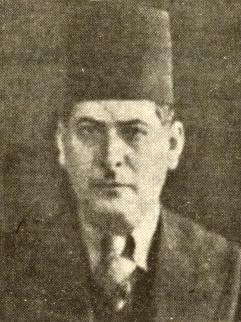
- Portrait of Fahmi al-Husseini

Mayor of Gaza
- In office 5 May 1928 – 1939
- Succeeded by: Rushdi al-Shawa

Personal details
- Born: 1886
- Died: 25 December 1940 (aged 53–54)
- Party: Palestine Free Party
- Profession: Lawyer, Magistrate

Fahmi Bey al-Husseini (Arabic: فهمي الحسيني, 1886 – December 25, 1940) was the mayor of Gaza, his hometown, from 1928 to 1939 while Palestine was under the British rule.

== Career in law ==
Al-Husseini studied law in Istanbul and upon graduation returned to Gaza where he became a prominent lawyer. He was then assigned as a member of the Land Court of Nablus but resigned soon after his appointment. He reentered work in his legal profession and subsequently was appointed Magistrate of Nablus. He was later appointed a member of the Central Council, and then resigned again to continue his work as a lawyer.

On December 1, 1923, he launched al-Haquq ("The Rights") magazine and was its editor-in-chief. Al-Husseini published the Sawt al-Haq ("Voice of the Truth") newspaper on October 6, 1927 and around the same period he translated into Arabic the famous Hanafi book on legal proceedings, Sharh Majallat al-Ahkam ("Commentaries on the Codified Hanafi Commercial Law", prepared in four volumes in Turkish during the Ottoman period by Allama Ali Haidar.

== Mayor ==
Also in 1927, al-Husseini, a political ally of the Nashashibi family, became a member of the Liberal Party which was founded in 1927, which defended all aspects of personal freedom. He was elected mayor of Gaza on May 5, 1928. In 1930, a number of Gaza notables, mostly members of the city's municipal council, complained to the high commissioner of Palestine about al-Husseini. They were angered at the decision to allow al-Husseini to maintain his legal practice while he served as Gaza's mayor, stating he was occupied with his own private business "to an extent as to neglect the interests of the town [Gaza] which is more needy of organization than any in this country." However, during his tenure, Gaza was extended to the coast (Rimal district), the local hospital and market were completed, the streets were widened, and the city received electricity in 1938 in cooperation with the Palestinian Electricity Company. Al-Husseini also oversaw the establishment of the municipal hall of Gaza along Omar Mukhtar Street. In addition to the latter street—which he named after the Libyan revolutionary Omar Mukhtar—he also named several other new streets in Gaza including Imam Shafi'i Street, Firas Street, and Jamal Fahmi Pasha Street.

In 1938, during the Arab revolt in Palestine, the British Mandate authorities had him arrested on charges of being a member of the anti-British leadership in Palestine. He, along with Mousa Sourani, was imprisoned in the Sarafand Jail. Al-Husseini was stripped of his post as mayor by the British in 1939 and was replaced by Rushdi al-Shawa. Al-Husseini died on December 25, 1940.

== Bibliography ==
- Feldman, Ilana (2008). Governing Gaza: Bureaucracy, Authority, and the Work of Rule, 1917-1967. Duke University Press. ISBN 978-0-8223-4240-3.
- Likhovski, Assaf (2006). Law and identity in mandate Palestine. UNC Press. ISBN 0-8078-3017-8.
