= Rushdi al-Shawwa =

Rushdi Al-Shawwa Bey
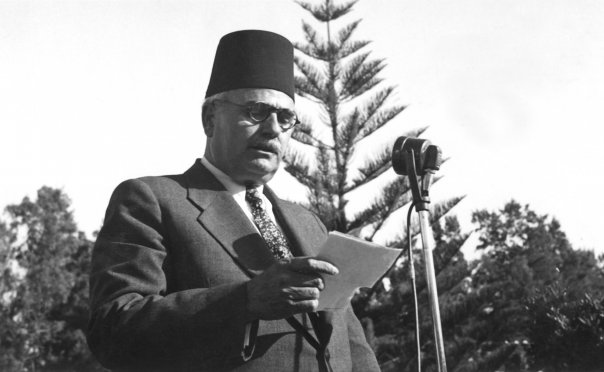
- Rushdi Sa'id Shawwa

Mayor of Gaza
- In office 1939–1951
- Preceded by: Fahmi al-Husseini
- Succeeded by: Abed Al Razak Klaybo

Personal details
- Born: c. 1889 Gaza, Ottoman Syria
- Died: 5 December 1965 London, UK
- Spouse: Shafiqa Al-Hussieni
- Children: Issam Al-Shawwa, Abdul Karim Al Shawwa, Siham Al Shawwa, Lamia Al Shawwa, Falak Al Shawwa, Hisham Al Shawwa, Yaser Al Shawwa, and Ali Maher Al Shawwa

Rushdi Sa'id Shawwa Bey (Arabic: رشـدي الحـاج سعيـد الشـوا) (b. 1889 – 5 December 1965) was the mayor of Gaza from 1939 to 1952. He was born in his father's house (former mayor Sa'id al-Shawa) in the al-Turukman section of the Shuja'iyya neighborhood. His mother, Hafiza Sha’ath from Beersheba, came from a major tribe in that area. Her brother, Tajuddin Sha'ath, was the head of the tribe and a former mayor of Beersheba.

== Biography ==
Rushdi was sent to Istanbul in 1899 for education. He studied law and finished in 1914. He came to Gaza for the summer and was supposed to return to Istanbul in September–October for his official graduation, but was unable to as the University of Istanbul was destroyed during World War I. To get a degree, Rushdi instead went to Damascus, enrolled in the Syrian University (now the University of Damascus) and graduated in one year. In 1925, he returned to Palestine which was under British control and took up residence in the city of Jaffa.

During his time as mayor of Gaza, Rushdi started rebuilding the infrastructure of the city. He started building asphalt roads, dug Bir as-Safa (as-Safa water well)—the first water well equipped with a pump and engine in Gaza—and started distributing water to houses through a water pipe system. He also started the first sewage draining system and provided electricity as well as many other services for the citizens of Gaza. He built the as-Shuja'iyya School, az-Zaytoon School, Salahuddin School, and was the head of the founding committee that built the Palestine High School. He also participated in formal networks with other Arab mayors across Palestine, such as at the Fourth Conference of the Arab Mayors of Palestine hosted in Gaza in 1945.

When the British Mandate over Palestine ended on 15 May 1948, Rushdi and along with other Arab mayors in Palestine were awarded the Order of the British Empire Medallion (OBE) by King George VI. Rushdi was elected mayor of Gaza more than once, serving for four terms. When British troops left Palestine on 15 May, Rushdi was the last mayor elected for Gaza. Since 1946 no elections have been held for the municipality of Gaza. Rushdi flew the flag of Palestine over the municipal headquarters (as-Saraya) in Gaza upon the departure of the last British soldier from the city that same day.

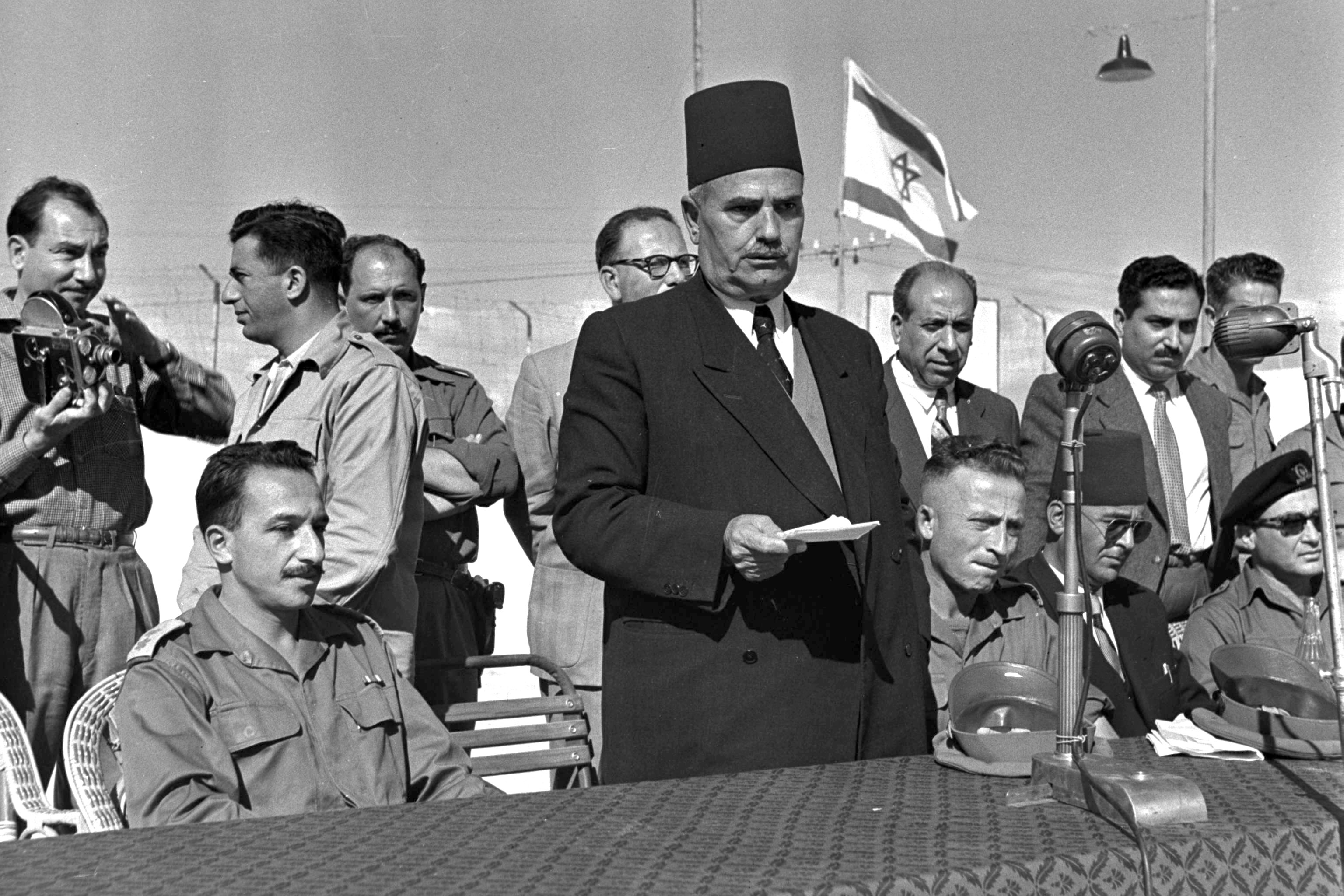
The newly appointed mayor of Gaza, Rushdi al-Shawwa, speaking at the inauguration ceremony of the Gaza municipal council, 26 November 1956

After Rushdi's term ended in 1951, the Egyptian authority did not run any elections for the Municipality of Gaza. They started appointing mayors and members of the council. When Israel occupied the Gaza Strip during the Sinai War in 1956, Rushdi accepted the responsibility of the Municipality of Gaza and helped saving the people's lives, secured food, security, and other needs of Gaza City's residents and the inhabitants of the Gaza Strip as well. His term as mayor ended on 7 March 1957.

Rushdi died in London on 5 December 1965 and his body transferred to Gaza on a United Nations aircraft via Beirut. In Gaza, a formal and national funeral for was held for him on 9 December 1965.
