= Yahya Al-Sarraj =

Palestinian academic and politician

- يحيى السراج
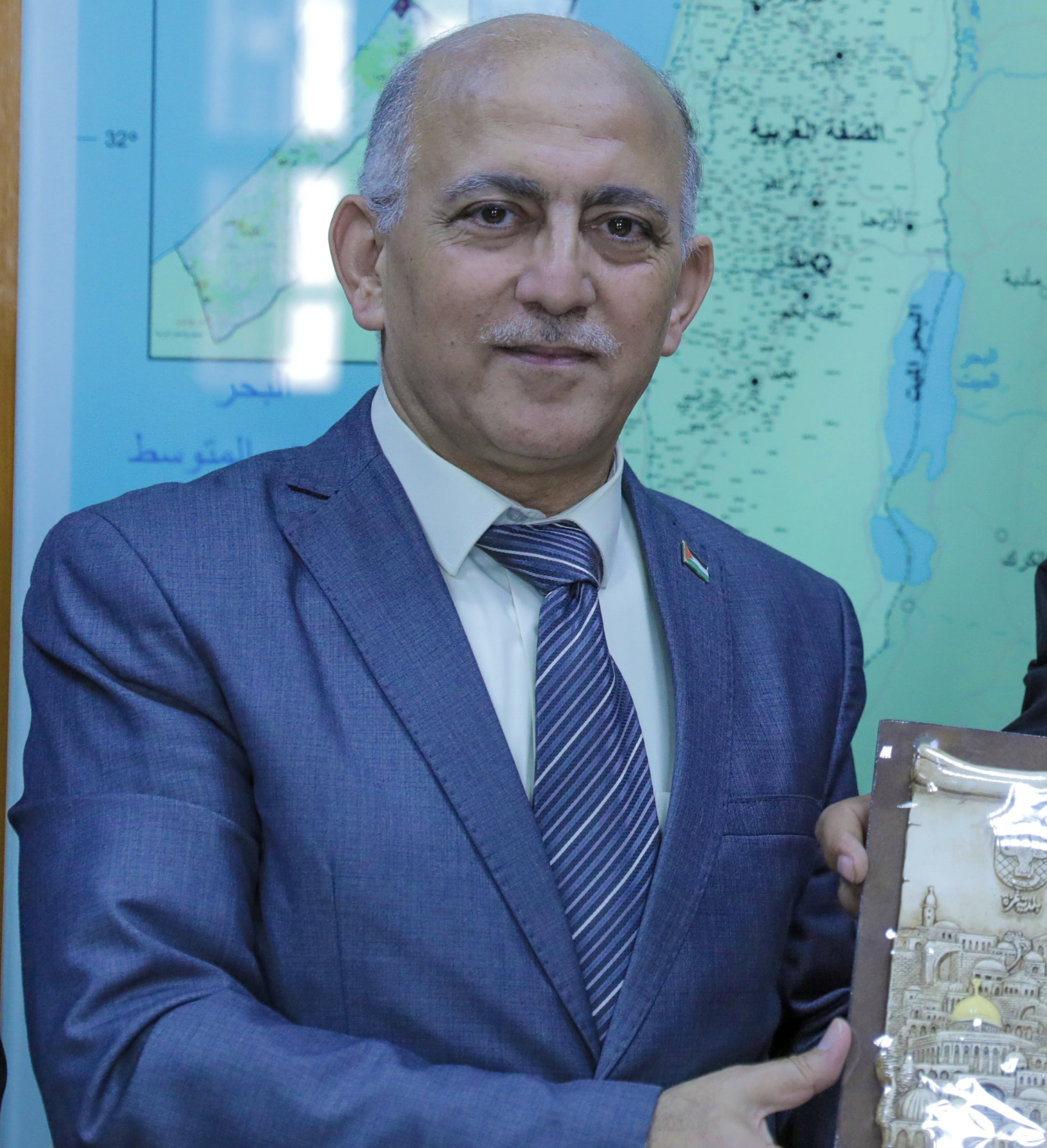
- Al-Sarraj in 2022

Mayor of Gaza City
- Incumbent
- Assumed office 27 July 2019
- Preceded by: Nizar Hijazi

Personal details
- Born: Yahya Rushdi Al-Sarraj; February 24, 1962 (age 64) Gaza City, Gaza Strip
- Party: Nonpartisan

Yahya Rushdi Al-Sarraj (or Yahya R. Sarraj or Yahya Sarraj; born 24 February 1962) is a Palestinian university professor and professional consultant, who has served as mayor of Gaza City since 2019. Al-Sarraj is a graduate of An-Najah University and the University of Leeds, and received his doctorate from the University of Bradford.

== Academic career ==
In 2003 Al-Sarraj was elected Rector of the University College of Applied Sciences, In 2014, he was the deputy chairman of external affairs at the Islamic University of Gaza. He served on a joint committee addressing financial issues across Gazan universities

== Mayoralty ==
Al-Sarraj became Mayor of Gaza City in July 2019. He was selected at a special meeting of the Open House of the Municipality of Gaza by city notables. Fatah, the political party that dominates the Palestinian Authority in the West Bank, denounced the selection process, although it eventually reconciled with Al-Sarraj. At the handover ceremony, he listed internal affairs, service development, activating cultural centres, and focusing on development and investment as the four priorities of the city council under his leadership.

Later in 2019 he announced that he was working on a campaign to get Gaza residents to sort their garbage, and was hoping that a private company could be found to recycle it.

After the 2021 conflict with Israel, Al-Sarraj announced the "We Will Rebuild It" campaign to fix damage caused by the war. He also called for the lifting of Israel's blockade on Gaza, which he blamed for the ongoing financial crisis in Gaza City. In June 2021, Al-Sarraj was honoured with the presentation of the "Shield of Loyalty" by Fatah's Democratic Reform Movement for his work and effectiveness on rebuilding Gaza.
