= Jean-Pierre Filiu =

French historian and former diplomat (1961)

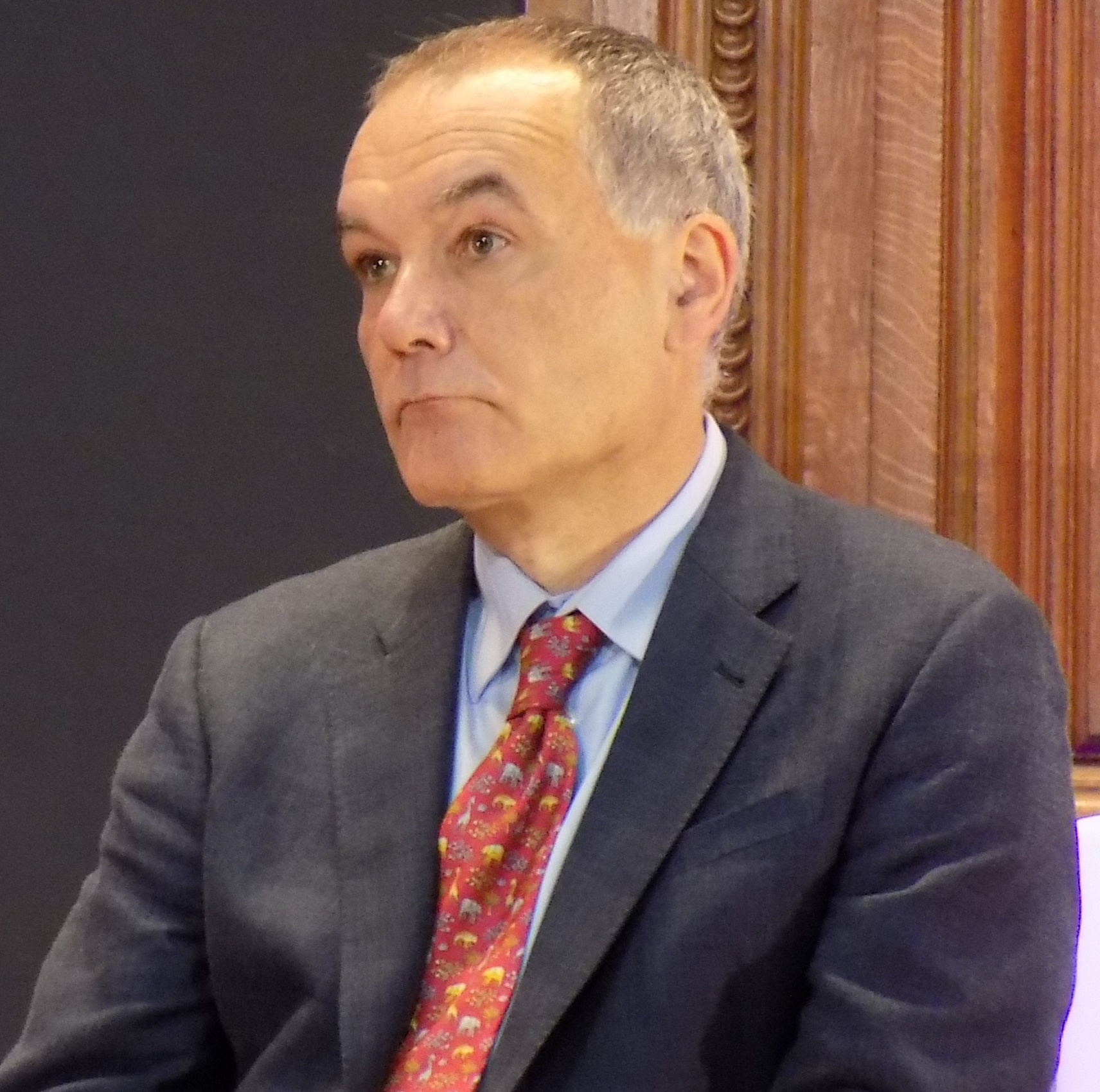
- Filiu in 2015
- Born: 19 December 1961 (age 64); Paris, France
- Education: INALCO; Sciences Po
- Occupations: Historian; Arabist; diplomat

Jean-Pierre Filiu (born in Paris, 1961) is a French historian and Arabist. He is currently a professor of Middle East studies at Sciences Po's School of International Affairs.

== Life and career ==
Before joining Sciences Po in 2006, Filiu was a career diplomat who served as a junior officer representing France in Jordan and the United States, before becoming the French Deputy Chief of Mission (DCM) in Syria (1996–99) and in Tunisia (2002-2006). Filiu was also diplomatic adviser to the French minister of Interior (1990–91), the minister of Defense (1991–93) and the Prime Minister (2000-2002). He was one of the ten independent experts that President François Hollande designated to contribute to the 2013 White Book for National Defense and Security.

Filiu authored or co-authored some twenty books, including The Arab Revolution: Ten lessons from the Democratic Uprising. He later authored Gaza: A History (2014, Palestine Book Award), From Deep State to Islamic State: The Arab Counter-Revolution and its Jihadi Legacy (2015), and Revisiting the Arab Uprisings: The Politics of a Revolutionary Moment (2018).

His previous research focused on the multi-faceted adaptation of Islam to globalized modernity. He described the conflicting dialectics between local and global jihad. And he highlighted how radical movements try to "modernize" traditional concepts, giving them a new meaning previously unknown in Islam, for instance in the case of the caliphate. His book Apocalypse in Islam was awarded the main prize (Augustin-Thierry) by the Rendez-vous de l'Histoire, held every October in the city of Blois.

He has been a visiting professor at Columbia University and Georgetown University and has been a guest speaker to the Harvard Kennedy School, Rice University's Baker Institute for Public Policy and multiple think tanks.

In December 2024, Filiu was permitted to travel within the Gaza Strip for one month. The results of his experience were published in a book appearing in French in May 2025, and later in the same year in English translation.

== Other activities ==
Filiu has been interviewed by Christiane Amanpour, BBC, and Al Jazeera, and has been a guest to the English version of France 24. He also published five graphic novels and wrote the lyrics of two songs, one about the conflict in the Gaza Strip and the other about the Syrian civil war.

== Selected publications ==
- Mitterrand et la Palestine, Fayard, 2005
- Les Frontières du jihad, Fayard, 2006
- L'Apocalypse dans l'Islam, Fayard, 2008 (Grand prix des Rendez-vous de l'histoire)
  - Apocalypse in Islam, University of California Press, Berkeley, 2011
- Les Neuf Vies d'Al-Qaida, Fayard 2009, réédition La véritable histoire d'Al-Qaïda, Pluriel Hachette, 2011
- Les Meilleurs Ennemis - Une histoire des relations entre les États-Unis et le Moyen-Orient, avec David B., Futuropolis (roman graphique) :
  - Best of Enemies: A History of US and Middle East Relations, Harry N. Abrams, 2012–
    - Première partie 1783-1953, 2011 (Part One, 2012)
    - Deuxième partie 1953-1984, 2014 (Part Two, 2014)
    - Troisième partie 1984-2013, 2016 (Part Three, 2018)
- La Révolution arabe : Dix leçons sur le soulèvement démocratique, Fayard, 2011 (prix Ailleurs 2012)
  - The Arab Revolution: Ten Lessons from the Democratic Uprising, Oxford University Press, 2011
- Le Printemps des Arabes, avec Cyrille Pomès, Futuropolis (roman graphique), 2013
- Histoire de Gaza, Fayard, 2015 (Palestine Book Award 2015)
  - Gaza: A History, Hurst, London, 2014; second edition, 2024
- Les Arabes, leur destin et le nôtre, La Découverte, 2015 (prix Augustin-Thierry 2015)
- Qui est Daech?, avec Edgar Morin, Régis Debray, Gilles Kepel, Michel Onfray, Olivier Weber, Jean-Christophe Rufin et Tahar Ben Jelloun, Philippe Rey, 2015
- La Dame de Damas, avec Cyrille Pomès (roman graphique), Futuropolis, 2015
- Le miroir de Damas, La Découverte, 2017
- (Editor, with Stéphane Lacroix) Revisiting the Arab Uprisings: The Politics of a Revolutionary Moment, Hurst & Company, 2017
- Généraux, gangsters et jihadistes : histoire de la contre-révolution arabe, La Découverte, 2018
- Main basse sur Israël : Netanyahou et la fin du rêve sioniste, La Découverte, 2019.
- Algérie, la nouvelle indépendance, Le Seuil, 2019.
- Le Milieu des mondes – Une histoire laïque du Moyen-Orient depuis 395, 384 pages, Le Seuil.
  - The Middle East: A Political History from 395 to the Present, Polity, 2023
- Stupéfiant Moyen-Orient, une histoire de drogue, de pouvoir et de société, 224 pages, Le Seuil, 2023.
- Comment la Palestine fut perdue : Et pourquoi Israël n'a pas gagné. Histoire d'un conflit (XIXe – XXIe siècle), Le Seuil, 2024, 432 p. (ISBN 978-2-02-153833-5)[20].
- Un historien à Gaza, Paris, Les Arènes, 28 mai 2025, 203 p. (ISBN 1037513789)
  - A Historian in Gaza. Hurst, (forthcoming November 2025)
