= 2022 Jabalia fire =

Disaster in Gaza Strip, Palestine

- Date: 17 November 2022
- Location: Jabalia Refugee Camp, Jabalia, Gaza Strip, Palestine
- Cause: suspected to be a gas leak that was ignited by candles
- Deaths: 21
- Injuries: Unknown

On 17 November 2022, a fire at a residential building killed 21 people in the Jabalia Refugee Camp in the Gaza Strip, Palestine. Most of the victims were from the Abu Raya family who were celebrating the return of a family member who had come back from abroad. Israeli media reported that seven children had died while the BBC reported ten.

The fire is believed to have come from large amounts of gasoline somebody had stored inside the building to use a generator. The candles appear to have ignited the gasoline, triggering the blaze.

Palestinian President Mahmoud Abbas ordered a national day of mourning to be held in honour of the victims. The PLO's secretary-general, Hussein al-Sheikh, asked for Israel to open the Erez Crossing in order to let wounded Palestinians seek treatment (the crossing is normally closed because Israel is at war with the militant Islamist Hamas movement which controls the Gaza Strip). Israeli Defence Minister Benny Gantz confirmed that the Coordinator of Government Activities in the Territories was looking to provide humanitarian assistance to the fire victims.

== See also ==
- September 23, 2005 Jabalia Camp incident
- 2021 Jabalia accident
- 2022 West Bank bus crash
