= List of cities in Palestine =

Location of Palestine

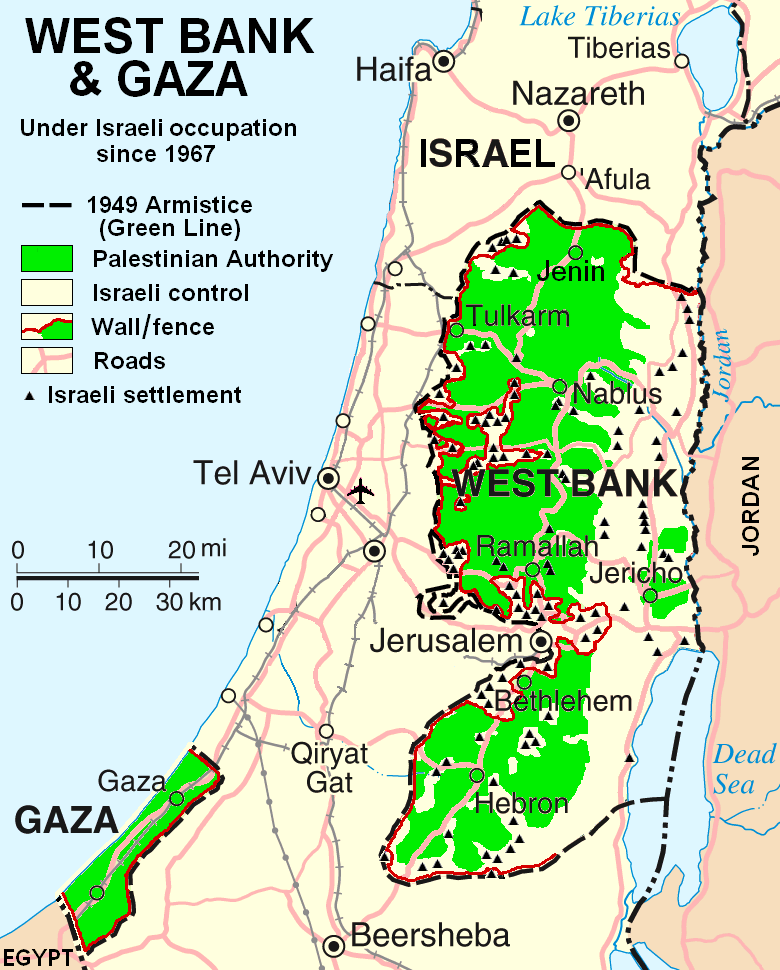
Map of cities in Palestine

The signing of the Oslo II accords (also known as the 1995 Interim agreements and sometimes called the Taba Agreement) between Israeli Prime Minister Yitzchak Rabin and PLO Chairman Yasser Arafat, took place on 28 September 1995. The Palestinian National Authority, which was renamed to the State of Palestine in 2013, took control of civil affairs in the West Bank Palestinian enclaves, designated Areas A and B, where most Palestinian population centers are located (and excluding those within the municipal borders of East Jerusalem). Israel Defense Forces are responsible for security in Area B in the West Bank and have full control over localities in Area C.

The Local Government Ministry of the Palestinian National Authority is responsible for granting a town with city or municipality status. However, there is no specific guidelines for a particular locality to achieve the status of Palestinian city. It is mostly judged on the population reaching above 20,000. The Palestinian Central Bureau of Statistics (PCBS) took its latest official census in 2017.

The largest city in the Gaza Strip and all of Palestine was Gaza City prior to the Gaza war, and the largest cities in the West Bank are East Jerusalem and Hebron. Some cities form agglomerations with other towns or cities, such as the Bethlehem metropolitan area with Beit Jala and Beit Sahour. Ramallah and al-Bireh also form an agglomeration and are often considered a single city.

== Cities ==
Largest cities in the State of Palestine by population

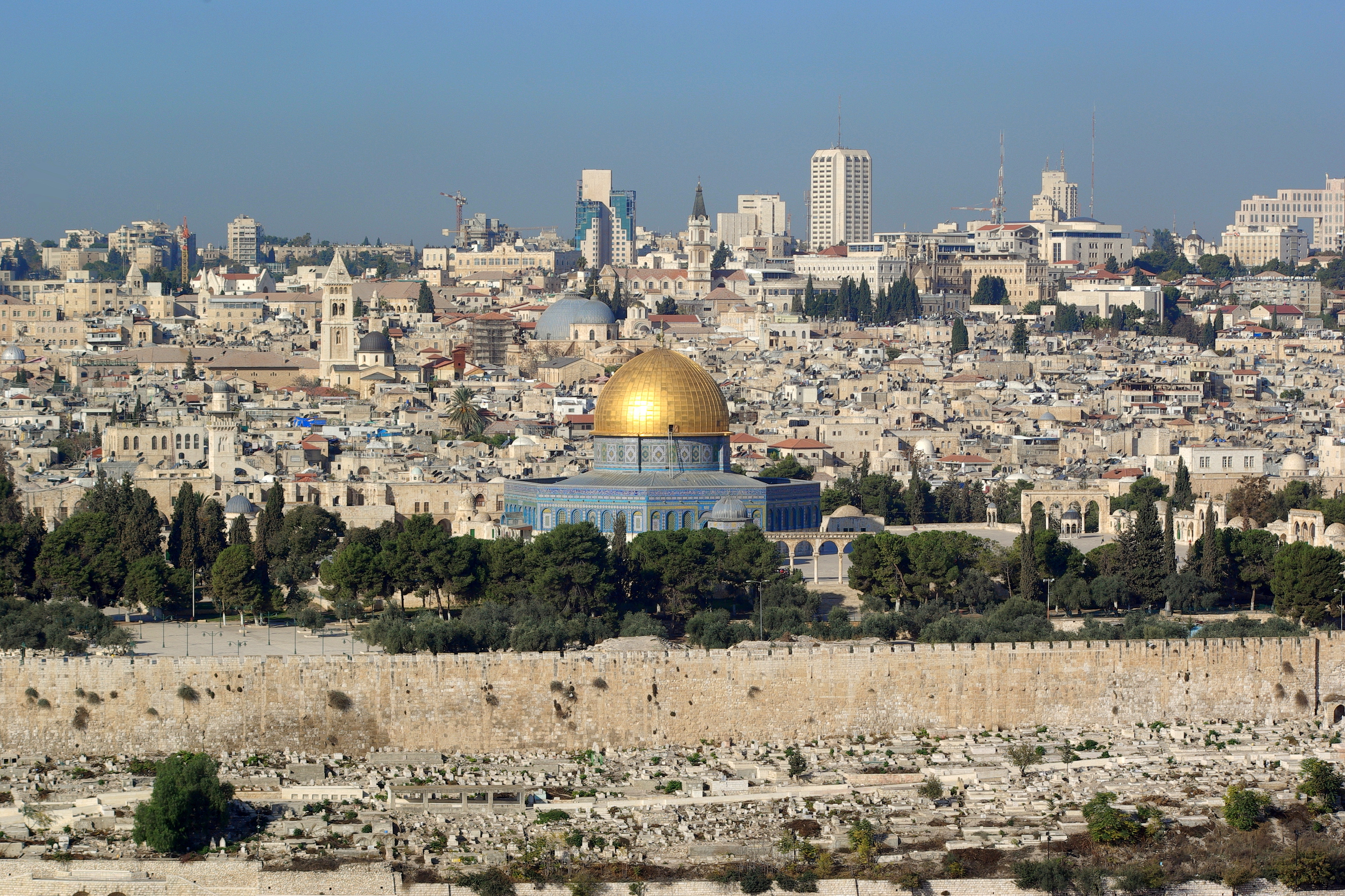
Jerusalem is Palestine's capital and largest city by population.

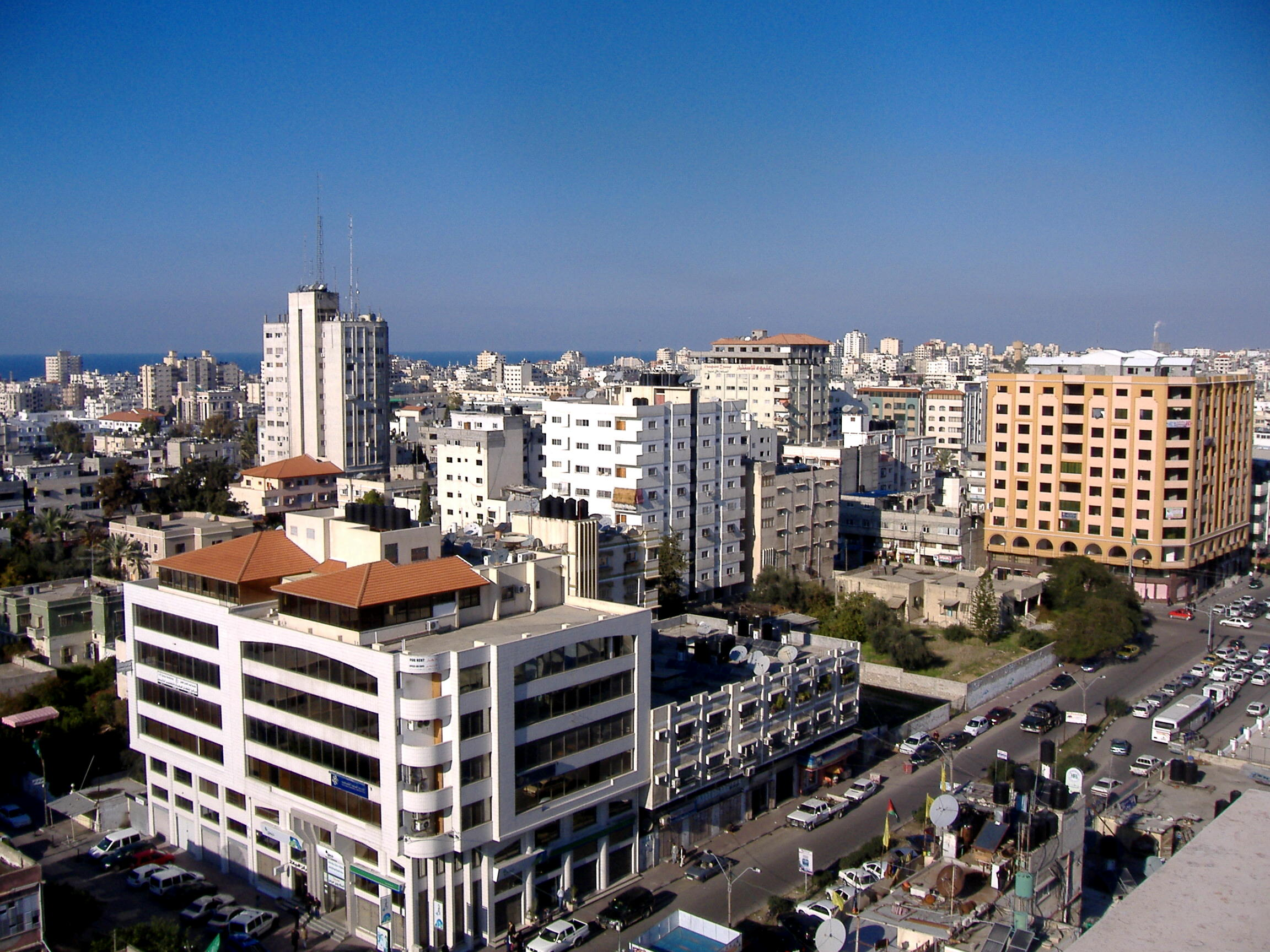
Gaza City, the second largest city by population

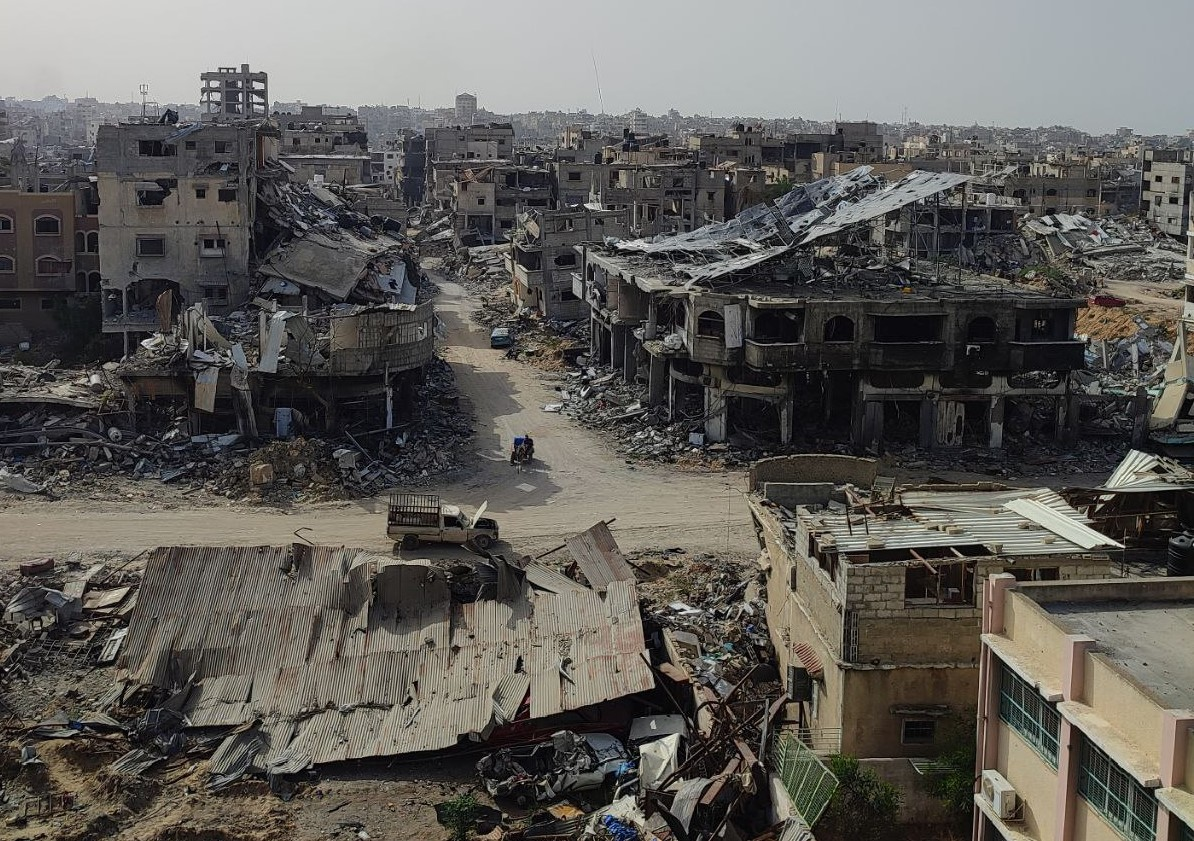
Khan Yunis is the third largest city by population.

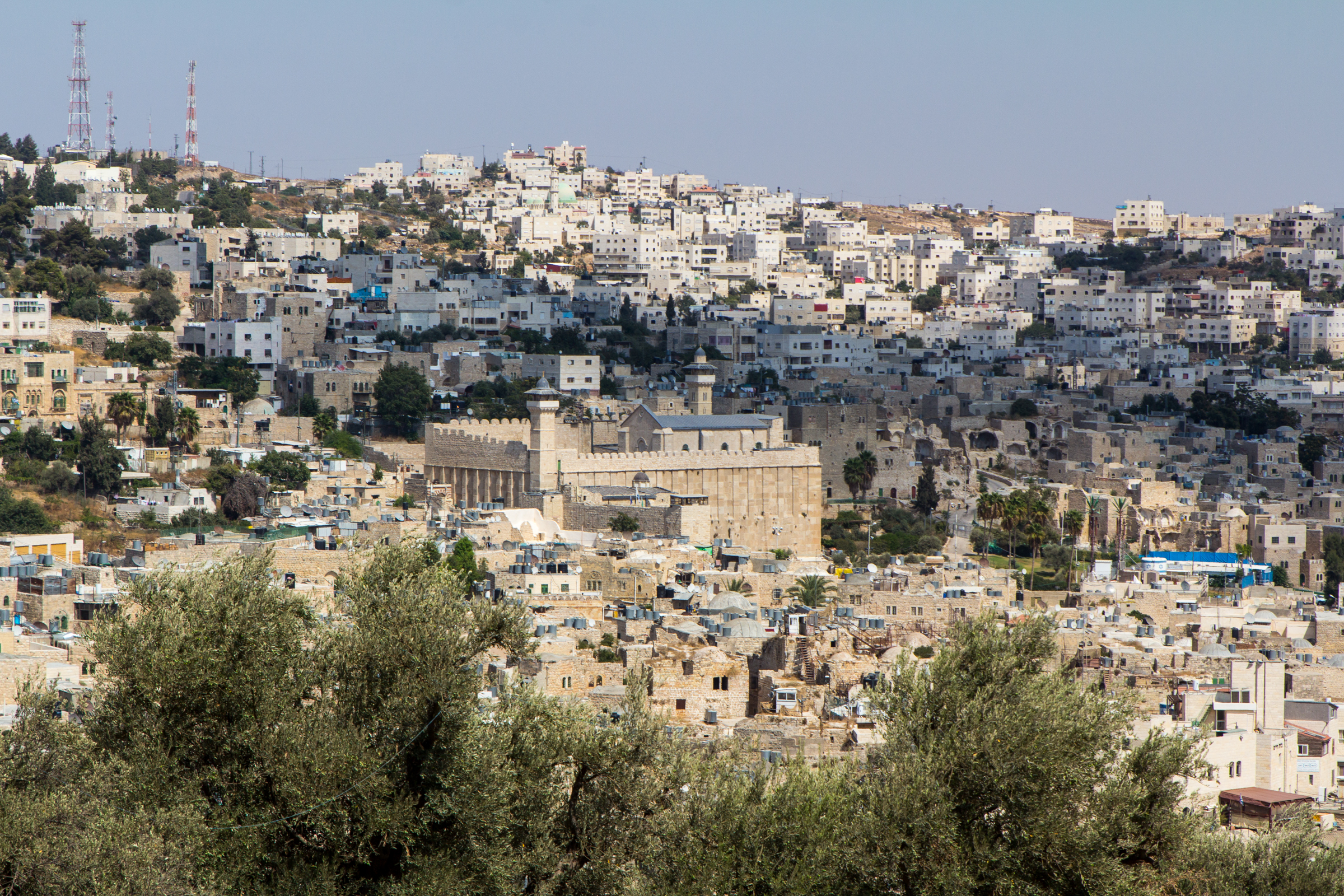
Hebron, Palestine's fourth largest municipality by population

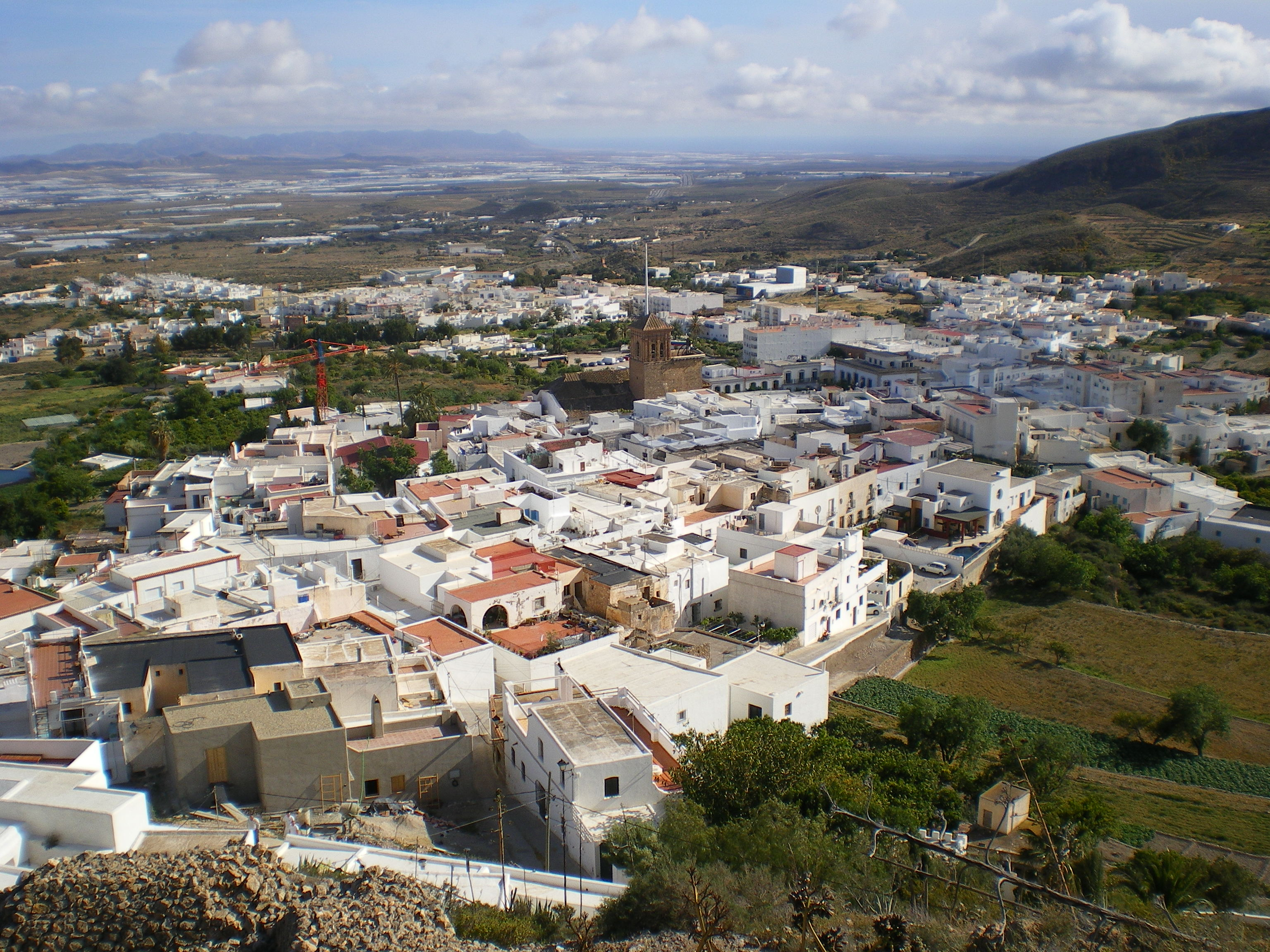
Deir al-Balah, Palestine's fourth largest municipality by population

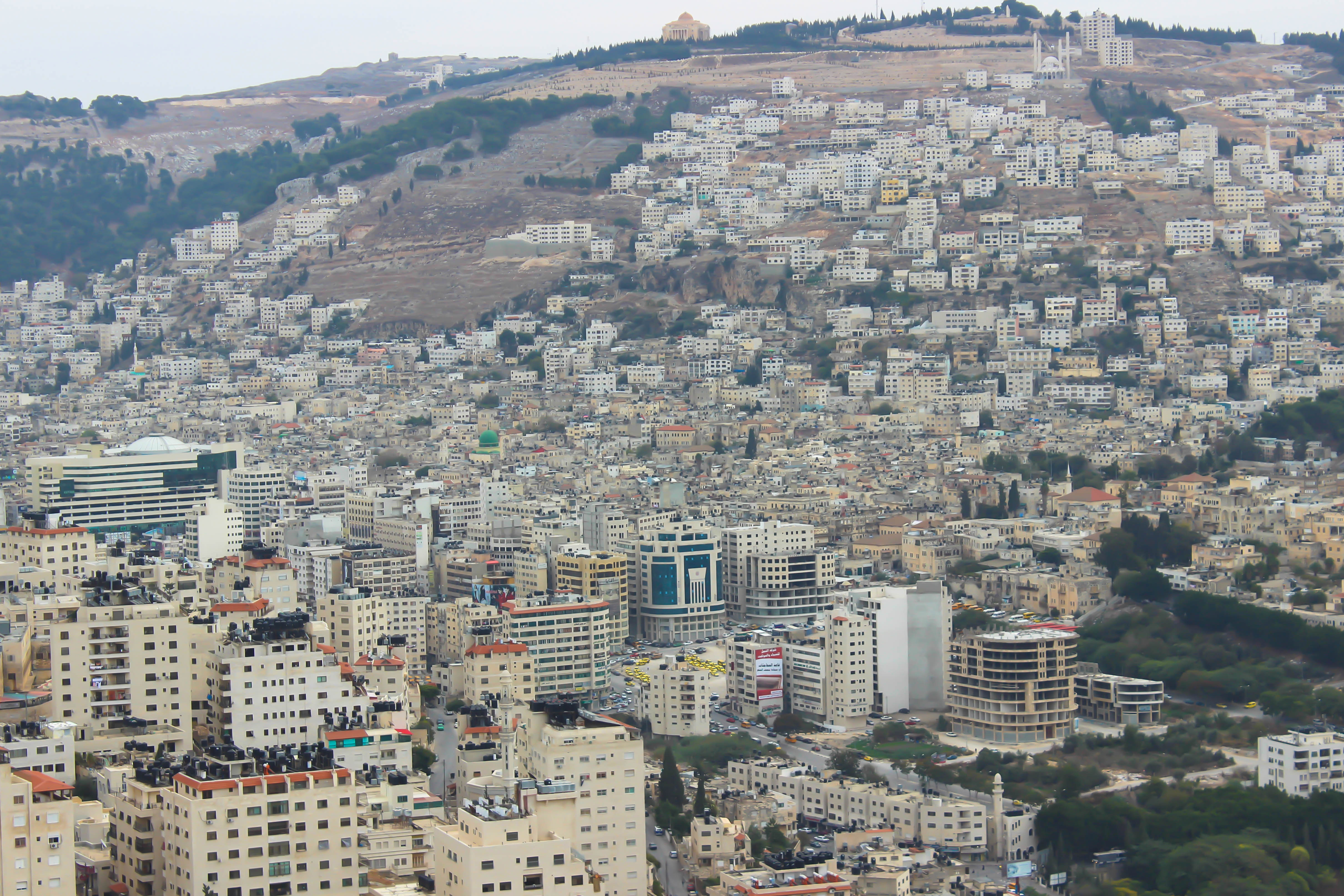
Nablus, Palestine's fourth largest municipality by population

† Governorate capital

Notes: Salfit is the capital of the Salfit Governorate but due to its low population, it does not have city status

Cities in the State of Palestine
Name	Governorate	Jurisdiction	Population		
Name	Governorate	Jurisdiction	2026 estimate (Note: Projection published in 2021, and is the latest available official data)	2017 census	Change
Abasan al-Kabira عبسان الكبيرة	Khan Yunis, Gaza Strip	Area A	34,464 (Note: "Population estimates were prepared before the Israeli aggression against Gaza Strip on October 7th, 2023, and may not represent the current reality of the population")	26,767	+28.8%
Abu Dis أبو ديس	Jerusalem, West Bank	Area B	N/A (Note: Newer PCBS data aggregates several localities near Jerusalem into one number)	12,251	-
Bani Na'im بني نعيم	Hebron, West Bank	Area A, Area B	30,640	24,628	+24.4%
Bani Suheila بني سهيلا	Khan Yunis, Gaza Strip	Area A	53,355	41,439	+28.8%
Beit Hanoun بيت حانون	North Gaza, Gaza Strip	Area A	68,984	52,237	+32.1%
Beit Jala بيت جالا	Bethlehem, West Bank	Areas A (Note: Area A comprises approximately 3,500 dunams (3.5 km^{2}) or about 25% of the town's land, which is under Palestinian control. The remaining 75% (Area C) is under Israeli jurisdiction. 7% of Area C in total is located inside the municipality's borders) and C	16,102	13,484	+19.4%
Beit Lahia بيت لاهيا	North Gaza, Gaza Strip	Area A	118,640	89,838	+32.1%
Beit Sahour بيت ساحور	Bethlehem, West Bank	Area A	15,860	13,281	+19.4%
Beit Ummar بيت اُمّر	Hebron, West Bank	Area B	21,121	16,977	+24.4%
Beitunia بيتونيا	Ramallah and al-Bireh, West Bank	Area A	31,741	26,604	+19.3%
Bethlehem† بيت لحم	Bethlehem, West Bank	Area A	34,143	28,591	+19.4%
al-Bireh البيرة	Ramallah and al-Bireh, West Bank	Area A	54,853	45,975	+19.3%
Deir al-Balah† دير البلح	Deir al-Balah, Gaza Strip	Area A	94,787	75,132	+26.2%
ad-Dhahiriya الظاهرية	Hebron, West Bank	Area A	44,693	35,924	+24.4%
Dura دورا	Hebron, West Bank	Area A	48,938	39,336	+24.4%
Gaza City† غزة	Gaza, Gaza Strip	Area A	727,304	590,481	+23.2%
Halhul حلحول	Hebron, West Bank	Area A	33,629	27,031	+24.4%
Hebron† الخليل	Hebron, West Bank	Areas A, B, and C	250,142	201,063	+24.4%
Idhna إذنا	Hebron, West Bank	Area B	32,358	26,009	+24.4%
Jabalia† جباليا	North Gaza, Gaza Strip	Area A	228,073	172,704	+32.1%
Jenin† جنين	Jenin, West Bank	Area A	59,288	49,908	+18.8%
Jericho† أريحا	Jericho, West Bank	Area A	24,353	20,907	+16.5%
Jerusalem† القُدس	Jerusalem, West Bank	Area C	N/A	N/A	-
Khan Yunis† خان يونس	Khan Yunis, Gaza Strip	Area A	264,108	205,125	+28.8%
Nablus† نابلس	Nablus, West Bank	Area A	184,152	156,906	+17.4%
Qabatiya قباطية	Jenin, West Bank	Area A	29,032	24,439	+18.8%
Qalqilya† قلقيلية	Qalqilya, West Bank	Area A	62,182	51,683	+20.3%
Rafah† رفح	Rafah, Gaza Strip	Area A	219,632	171,899	+27.8%
Ramallah† رام الله	Ramallah and al-Bireh, West Bank	Area A	46,528	38,998	+19.3%
Sa'ir سعير	Hebron, West Bank	Area B	25,780	20,722	+24.4%
as-Samu السموع	Hebron, West Bank	Area A	32,360	26,011	+24.4%
Surif صوريف	Hebron, West Bank	Area B, Area C	21,507	17,287	+24.4%
Tubas† طوباس	Tubas, West Bank	Area A	25,728	21,431	+20.1%
Tulkarm† طولكرم	Tulkarm, West Bank	Area A	74,838	64,532	+16.0%
Ya'bad يعبد	Jenin, West Bank	Area A	19,021	16,012	+18.8%
al-Yamun اليامون	Jenin, West Bank	Area A	24,678	20,774	+18.8%
Yatta يطّا	Hebron, West Bank	Area A	79,014	63,511	+24.4%
az-Zawayda الزوايدة	Deir al-Balah, Gaza Strip	Area A	30,078	23,841	+26.2%

== See also ==
- Arab localities in Israel
- List of cities in the Gaza Strip
- List of cities in Israel
- List of Israeli settlements with city status in the West Bank
- List of towns and villages depopulated during the 1947–1949 Palestine war
- List of twin towns and sister cities in Palestine
- List of villages depopulated during the Arab–Israeli conflict
- Municipality (Palestine)
- Palestinian refugee camps
- Village council (Palestine)
