= Surif =

- Municipality type A (City)

Arabic transcription(s)
  - Arabic: صوريف
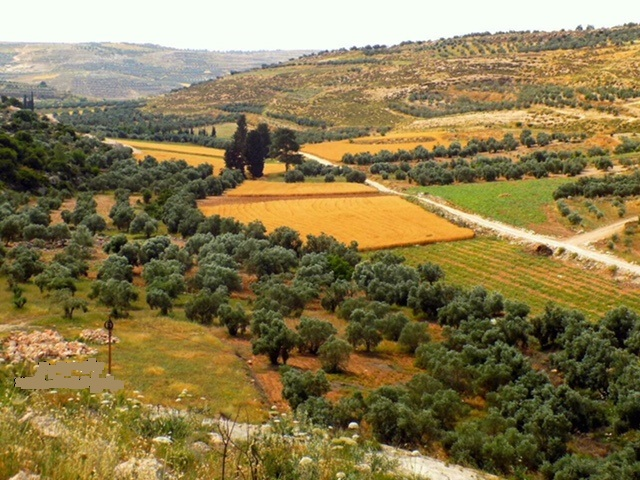
- Pastoral scene near Surif village

- Location of Surif within Palestine
- Coordinates: 31°39′02″N 35°03′58″E
- Palestine grid: 156/117
- State: State of Palestine
- Governorate: Hebron

Government
  - Type: City
  - Head of Municipality: Ahmad Lafi

Area
  - Total: 15.0 km^{2} (5.8 sq mi)

Population (2017)
  - Total: 17,287
  - Density: 1,150/km^{2} (2,980/sq mi)
- Name meaning: from personal name

Surif (Arabic: صوريف) is a Palestinian City in the Hebron Governorate located 25 km northwest of the city of Hebron. According to the Palestinian Central Bureau of Statistics census, Surif had a population of 17,287 in 2017. The population is entirely Muslim.

Most of the town's 15,000 dunams is used for agriculture, in particular, olives, wheat and barley. There are seven mosques and four schools located in its vicinity.

Ahmad Lafi is the mayor.

== History ==
=== Ottoman period ===
Oral tradition suggests that Surif was founded after the 16th century. In 1838 Surif was noted as a Muslim village, located between Hebron and Gaza, but subjected to the government of Hebron.

In 1863 Victor Guérin found Surif to be a village with 700 inhabitants. He further noted that beside a birket in the rock, a few cisterns and an ancient column shaft which was placed near a small mosque, all of Surif's constructions seemed more or less modern. An official Ottoman village list from about 1870 showed 87 houses and a population of 265, counting men only. In 1883, the PEF's Survey of Western Palestine described Surif as "A small village on a low hill, with olives to the south." In 1896 the population of Surif was 1,164.

=== British Mandate ===
According to the 1922 census of Palestine conducted by the British Mandate authorities, Surif had a population of 1,265 inhabitants, all Muslims, increasing in the 1931 census to 1,640, in 344 inhabited houses.

In the 1945 statistics the population of Surif was 2,190, all Muslims, with a total of 38,876 dunams of land according to an official land and population survey. Of this, 3,493 dunams were plantations and irrigable land, 11.325 for cereals, while 54 dunams were built-up (urban) land.

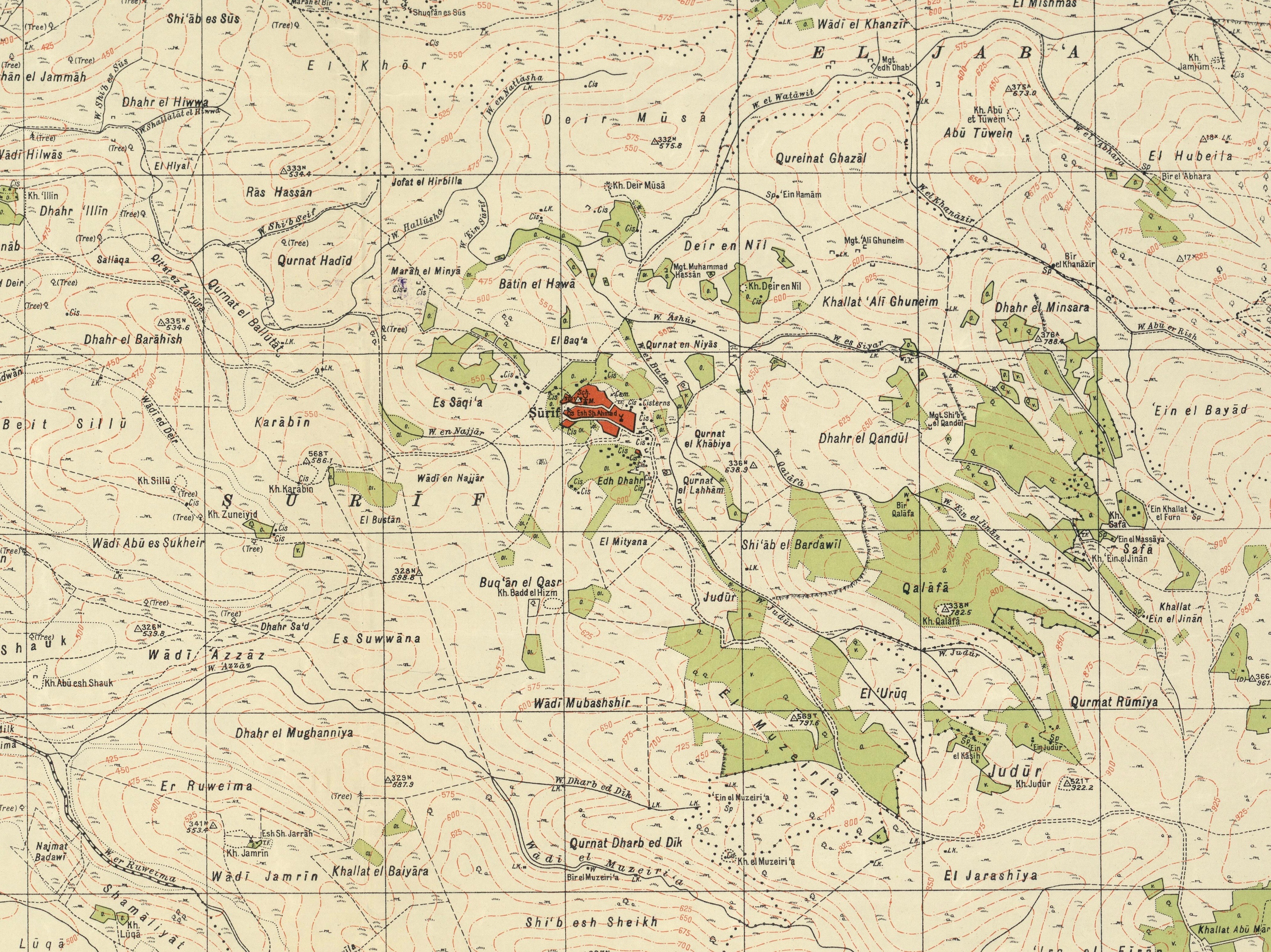
Surif, British Mandate map, 1:20,000

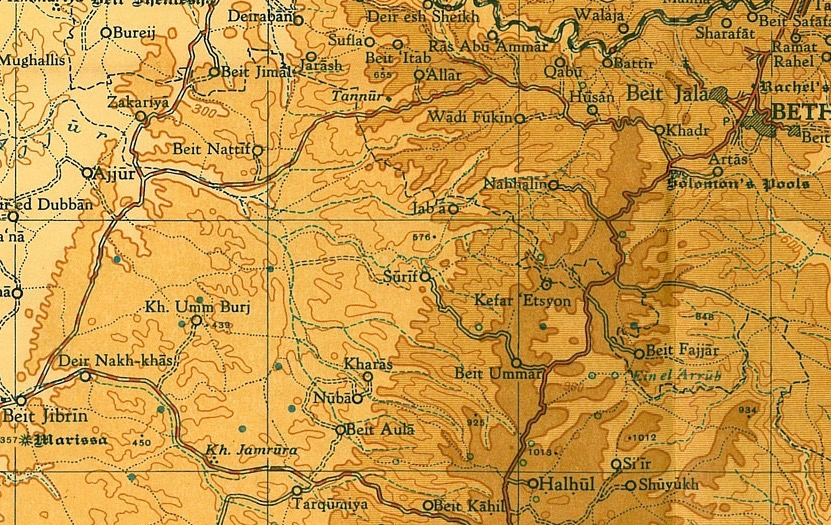
Surif 1945 1:250,000

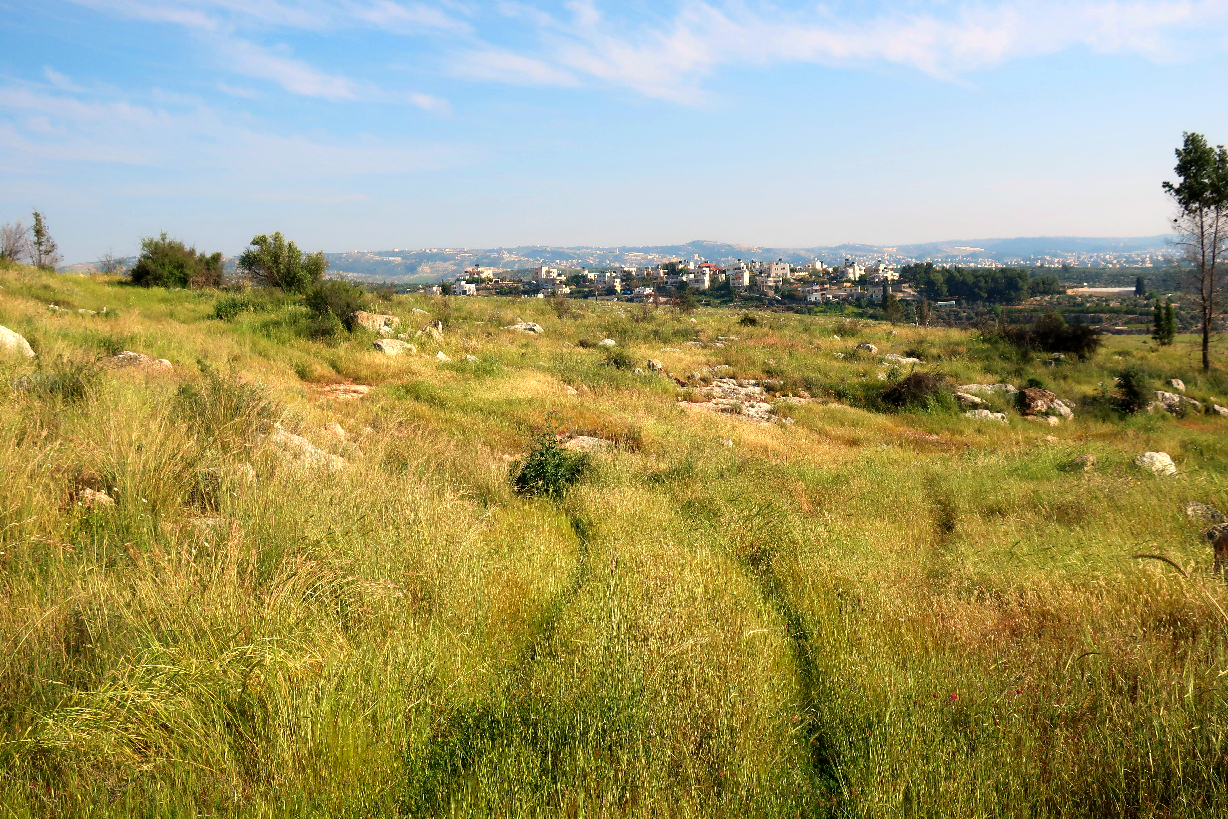
View of Surif

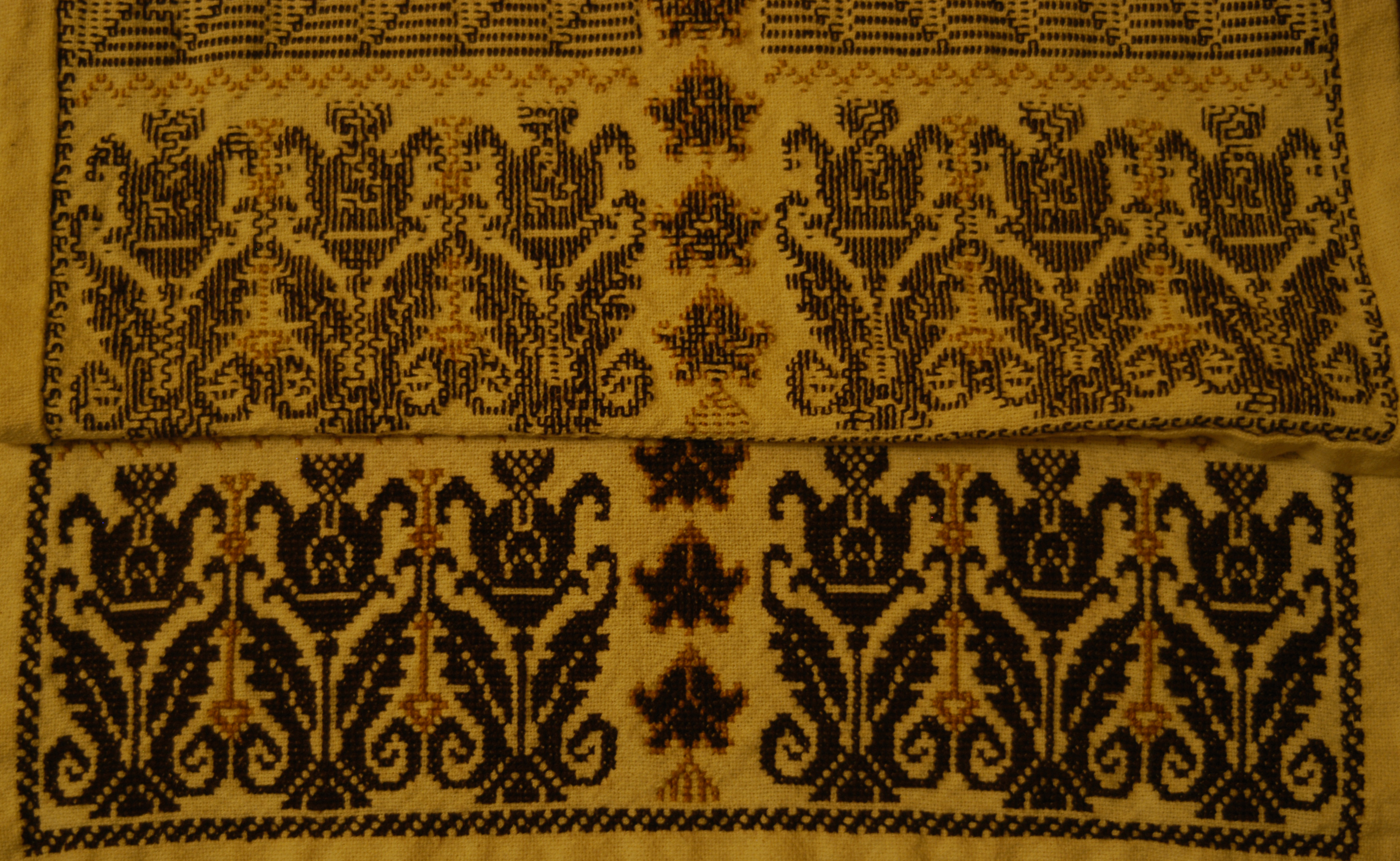
Example of traditional Palestinian cross-stitch from Surif (2006)

=== Jordanian rule ===
In the wake of the 1948 Arab–Israeli War and the 1949 Armistice Agreements, Surif came under Jordanian rule.

The Jordanian census of 1961 found 2,827 inhabitants in Surif.

=== Post-1967 ===
Since the Six-Day War in 1967, Surif has been under Israeli occupation.

Israel has confiscated approximately 1,213 dunams of land from Surif since 2000, and approximately 1,300 dunums of Surif lands will be behind the Israeli West Bank barrier, when it is finished.

In April 2023, the village was attacked for three days by dozens of settlers who broke into the village, injured residents with stones and vandalized and burned olive trees and residences. The attack by the settlers was carried out with the backing of an army that used gunfire and tear gas against residents who tried to defend themselves from the attackers. Since 2021, six cases of settler attacks have been documented, which included destruction of crops, damage to residences and injury to residents.

== Demography ==
Surif was originally settled by people from nearby Beit Ummar and possibly others. Some of the residents came from Salqa (a location of unknown identity near Gaza), al-Majdal and Gaza. It is also known as "Kuffin a-Tahta" since its residents, as those of Beit Ummar, lived there in the 16th century.

== Bibliography ==
- Barron, J.B., ed. (1923). Palestine: Report and General Abstracts of the Census of 1922. Government of Palestine.
- Conder, C.R.; Kitchener, H.H. (1883). The Survey of Western Palestine: Memoirs of the Topography, Orography, Hydrography, and Archaeology. Vol. 3. London: Committee of the Palestine Exploration Fund.
- Government of Jordan, Department of Statistics (1964). First Census of Population and Housing. Volume I: Final Tables; General Characteristics of the Population (PDF).
- Government of Palestine, Department of Statistics (1945). Village Statistics, April, 1945.
- Guérin, V. (1869). Description Géographique Historique et Archéologique de la Palestine (in French). Vol. 1: Judee, pt. 3. Paris: L'Imprimerie Nationale.
- Hadawi, S. (1970). Village Statistics of 1945: A Classification of Land and Area ownership in Palestine. Palestine Liberation Organization Research Center.
- Hartmann, M. (1883). "Die Ortschaftenliste des Liwa Jerusalem in dem türkischen Staatskalender für Syrien auf das Jahr 1288 der Flucht (1871)". Zeitschrift des Deutschen Palästina-Vereins. 6: 102–149.
- Mills, E., ed. (1932). Census of Palestine 1931. Population of Villages, Towns and Administrative Areas. Jerusalem: Government of Palestine.
- Palmer, E.H. (1881). The Survey of Western Palestine: Arabic and English Name Lists Collected During the Survey by Lieutenants Conder and Kitchener, R. E. Transliterated and Explained by E.H. Palmer. Committee of the Palestine Exploration Fund.
- Robinson, E.; Smith, E. (1841). Biblical Researches in Palestine, Mount Sinai and Arabia Petraea: A Journal of Travels in the year 1838. Vol. 3. Boston: Crocker & Brewster.
- Schick, C. (1896). "Zur Einwohnerzahl des Bezirks Jerusalem". Zeitschrift des Deutschen Palästina-Vereins. 19: 120–127.
- Socin, A. (1879). "Alphabetisches Verzeichniss von Ortschaften des Paschalik Jerusalem". Zeitschrift des Deutschen Palästina-Vereins. 2: 135–163.
