= List of twin towns and sister cities in Palestine =

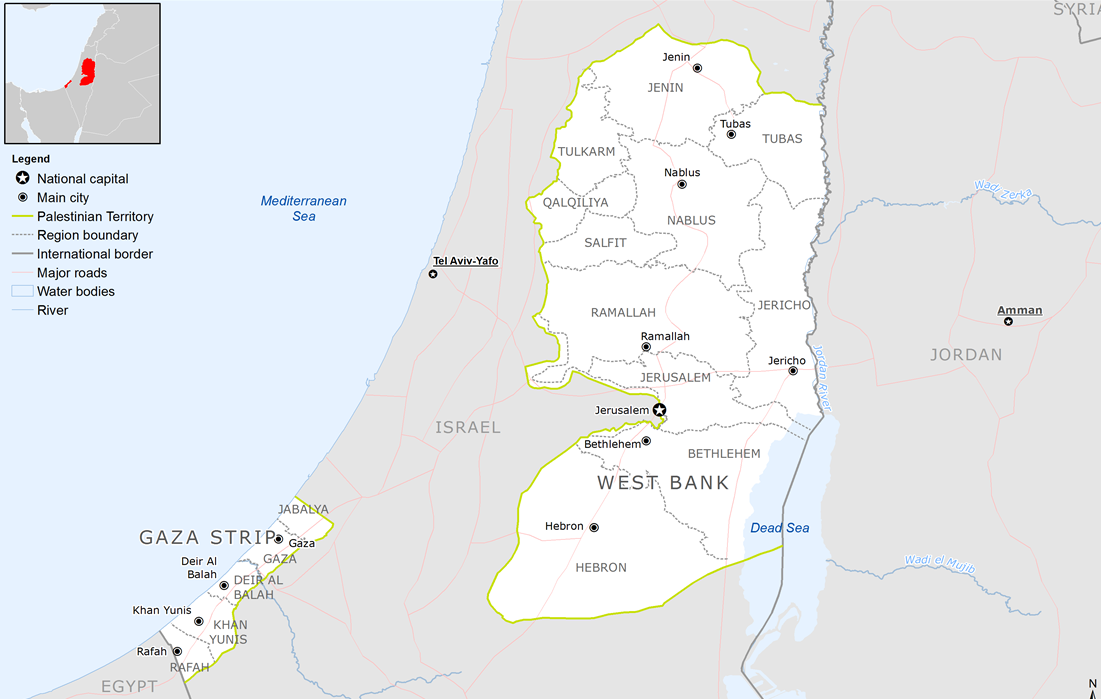
Map of Palestine

This is a list of places in Palestine which have standing links to local communities in other countries known as "town twinning" (usually in Europe) or "sister cities" (usually in the rest of the world).

== A ==
Aida Camp

- Nogent-sur-Oise, France
- Strasbourg, France

Al-Am'ari

- Stains, France

== B ==
Beit Hanoun

- Osmangazi, Turkey
- Selçuklu, Turkey
- Zeytinburnu, Turkey

Beit Jala

- Aubervilliers, France
- Bergisch Gladbach, Germany
- La Calera, Chile
- Jena, Germany
- Pitești, Romania
- Reggio Emilia, Italy
- Santa María del Mar, Peru
- Varazze, Italy

Beit Lahia

- Padang, Indonesia
- Talas, Turkey

Beit Sahour

- Agliana, Italy
- Aulnoye-Aymeries, France
- Chełm, Poland
- Doha, Qatar
- Opsterland, Netherlands
- (Republic of Ireland) Tralee, Ireland
- Utena, Lithuania
- Xanten, Germany

Beitunia

- Salé, Morocco

Bethlehem

- Abu Dhabi, United Arab Emirates
- Arad, Romania
- Assisi, Italy
- Athens, Greece
- Barranquilla, Colombia
- Brescia, Italy
- Budapest, Hungary
- Burlington, United States
- Capri, Italy
- Castelnuovo di Porto, Italy
- Catanzaro, Italy
- Chartres, France
- Chivasso, Italy
- La Cisterna, Chile
- Civitavecchia, Italy
- Cologne, Germany
- Concepción, Chile
- Las Condes, Chile
- Cori, Italy
- Cortale, Italy
- Creil, France
- Curinga, Italy
- Cusco, Peru
- Częstochowa, Poland
- Dakhla, Western Sahara
- Este, Italy
- Faggiano, Italy
- Florence, Italy
- Gallipoli, Italy
- Għajnsielem, Malta
- Glasgow, Scotland, United Kingdom
- Greccio, Italy
- Grenoble, France
- Grottaferrata, Italy
- Jacurso, Italy
- Joplin, United States
- Kalocsa, Hungary
- Lazio, Italy
- Lourdes, France
- Maida, Italy
- Marrickville (Inner West), Australia
- Milan, Italy
- Monterrey, Mexico
- Montesarchio, Italy
- Montevarchi, Italy
- Montpellier, France
- Natal, Brazil
- Orvieto, Italy
- Otranto, Italy
- Palermo, Italy
- Paray-le-Monial, France
- Pavia, Italy
- Pietrelcina, Italy
- Pratovecchio Stia, Italy
- Rabat, Morocco
- Sacramento, United States
- Saint-Herblain, France
- Saint Petersburg, Russia
- San Miniato, Italy
- San Pietro a Maida, Italy
- Sant'Anastasia, Italy
- Sarpsborg, Norway
- Steyr, Austria
- Suceava, Romania
- Třebechovice pod Orebem, Czech Republic
- Vagharshapat, Armenia
- Verbania, Italy
- Vicenza, Italy
- Villa Alemana, Chile
- Vladimir, Russia
- Zaragoza, Spain

Al-Bireh

- Gennevilliers, France

Birzeit

- Zestoa, Spain

== D ==
Deir al-Balah

- Bağcılar, Turkey

Dura

- Râmnicu Vâlcea, Romania

== E ==
East Jerusalem

- Cairo, Egypt
- Fez, Morocco
- Jakarta, Indonesia
- Nouakchott, Mauritania
- Oujda, Morocco
- Tehran, Iran

== G ==
Gaza City

- Agadir, Morocco
- Barcelona, Spain
- Brasília, Brazil
- Cáceres, Spain
- Cascais, Portugal
- Dubai, United Arab Emirates
- Dunkirk, France
- Gediz, Turkey
- Istanbul, Turkey
- Keçiören, Turkey
- Meram, Turkey
- Osmangazi, Turkey
- Sidon, Lebanon
- Tabriz, Iran
- Tromsø, Norway
- Turin, Italy
- Yıldırım, Turkey

== H ==
Halhul

- Hennebont, France

Hebron

- Amman, Jordan
- Bursa, Turkey
- Derby, England, United Kingdom
- Keçiören, Turkey
- Medina, Saudi Arabia
- Saint-Pierre-des-Corps, France
- Urfa, Turkey
- Yiwu, China

== J ==
Jabalia

- Tiguent, Mauritania
- Ümraniye, Turkey

Jericho

- Alessandria, Italy
- Campinas, Brazil
- Eger, Hungary
- Estación Central, Chile
- Fez, Morocco
- Foz do Iguaçu, Brazil
- Iași, Romania
- Ilion, Greece
- Kragujevac, Serbia
- Lærdal, Norway
- San Giovanni Valdarno, Italy
- Santa Bárbara, Brazil
- Al-Shuna al-Shamalyah, Jordan

Jenin

- Coslada, Spain
- Pernik, Bulgaria

Jifna

- , Bad Oldesloe, Germany
- Ivry-sur-Seine, France

== K ==
Khan Yunis

- Bisceglie, Italy
- El-Gadarif, Sudan
- Hamar, Norway
- Palermo, Italy
- Tétouan, Morocco

Kobar

- Walsall, England, United Kingdom

== M ==
Marda

- Arbizu, Spain

Mas-ha

- Red Hook, United States

== N ==
Nablus

- Boulder, United States
- Chalandri, Greece
- Como, Italy
- Dundee, Scotland, United Kingdom
- Khasavyurt, Russia
- Lille, France
- Naples, Italy
- Nazareth, Israel
- Poznań, Poland
- Rabat, Morocco
- Stavanger, Norway
- Tuscany, Italy

== Q ==
Qalqilya

- Gainesville, United States

== R ==
Rafah

- Pesaro, Italy
- Sancaktepe, Turkey

Ramallah

- Bordeaux, France
- Hounslow, England, United Kingdom
- Johannesburg, South Africa
- Liège, Belgium
- Muscatine, United States
- Oxford, England, United Kingdom
- Paterson, United States
- Sur, Turkey
- Trondheim, Norway
- (Republic of Ireland) Waterford, Ireland

== S ==
Salfit

- Dayton, United States

== T ==
Tulkarm

- Meknes, Morocco

== Z ==
Zababdeh

- Ixelles, Belgium
