= Blakhiya Byzantine cemetery =

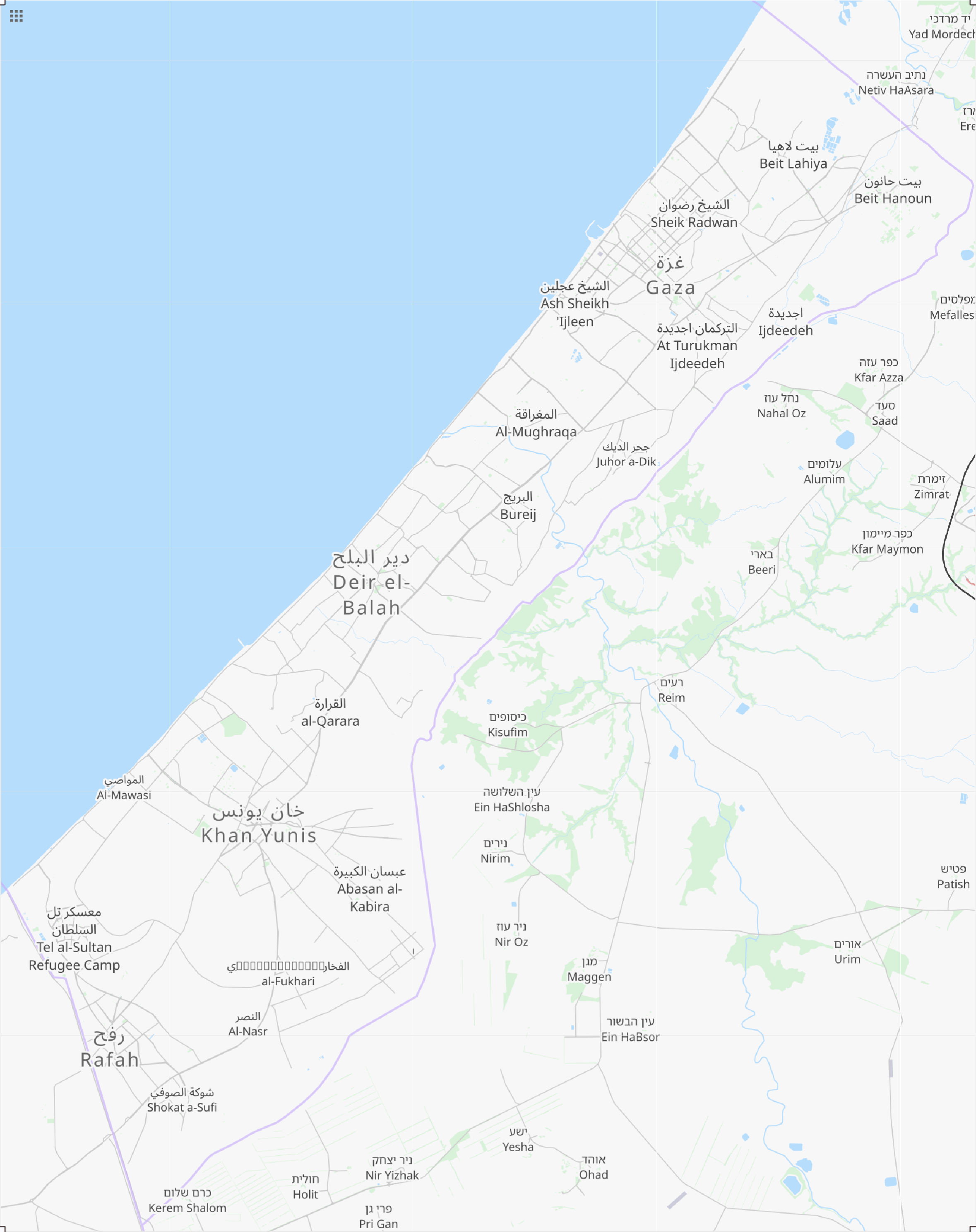
- Location within Gaza City Location within Gaza Strip Location within State of Palestine
- 31°32′40″N 34°27′22″E
- Type: Inhumation cemetery
- Periods: Byzantine
- Location: Near Blakhiya (Anthedon), Gaza Governorate, Gaza Strip, Palestine

Site notes
- Excavation dates: 1995–96
- Discovered: 1995

The Blakhiya Byzantine cemetery in the Gaza Strip in Palestine was used as a burial place from the 3rd to 5th centuries. It may have been linked to the nearby port of Anthedon. The site was discovered in 1995 and excavated the following year. More than 70 burials were excavated.

== Background ==
Little archaeological activity was carried out in the north of the Gaza Strip for much of the 20th century due to political circumstances and as there was a greater focus on the Biblical and Ancient Egyptian sites elsewhere in the region. From 1995, the amount of archaeological work in the Gaza Strip increased.

Anthedon was a coastal town and port inhabited from about 800 BC to 1100 AD, spanning the Iron Age to the early Muslim period. The nearby Ard-al-Moharbeen necropolis (discovered in 2022) was used from the 1st to 3rd centuries and was likely used by Anthedon's inhabitants.

== Cemetery features ==
Though the full extent of the cemetery is unknown, it is thought to measure several hundred metres across. The burials were mostly aligned north-west to south-east. Few objects were found in the burials, but pottery and coins were found elsewhere in the cemetery, and were dated to the 3rd to 5th centuries. Six of the tombs featured traces of painted plaster.

74 burials were excavated. The burials were cists, comprising a shaft and a burial chamber. Remains were identified of 68 people, and just over two-fifths were aged approximately 17 or under. The arrangement of the burials indicates that the cemetery was planned. The layout at Blakhiya is comparable to the broadly contemporary cemeteries at Be'er Sheva and Khirbat Faynan.

== Discovery and excavation ==
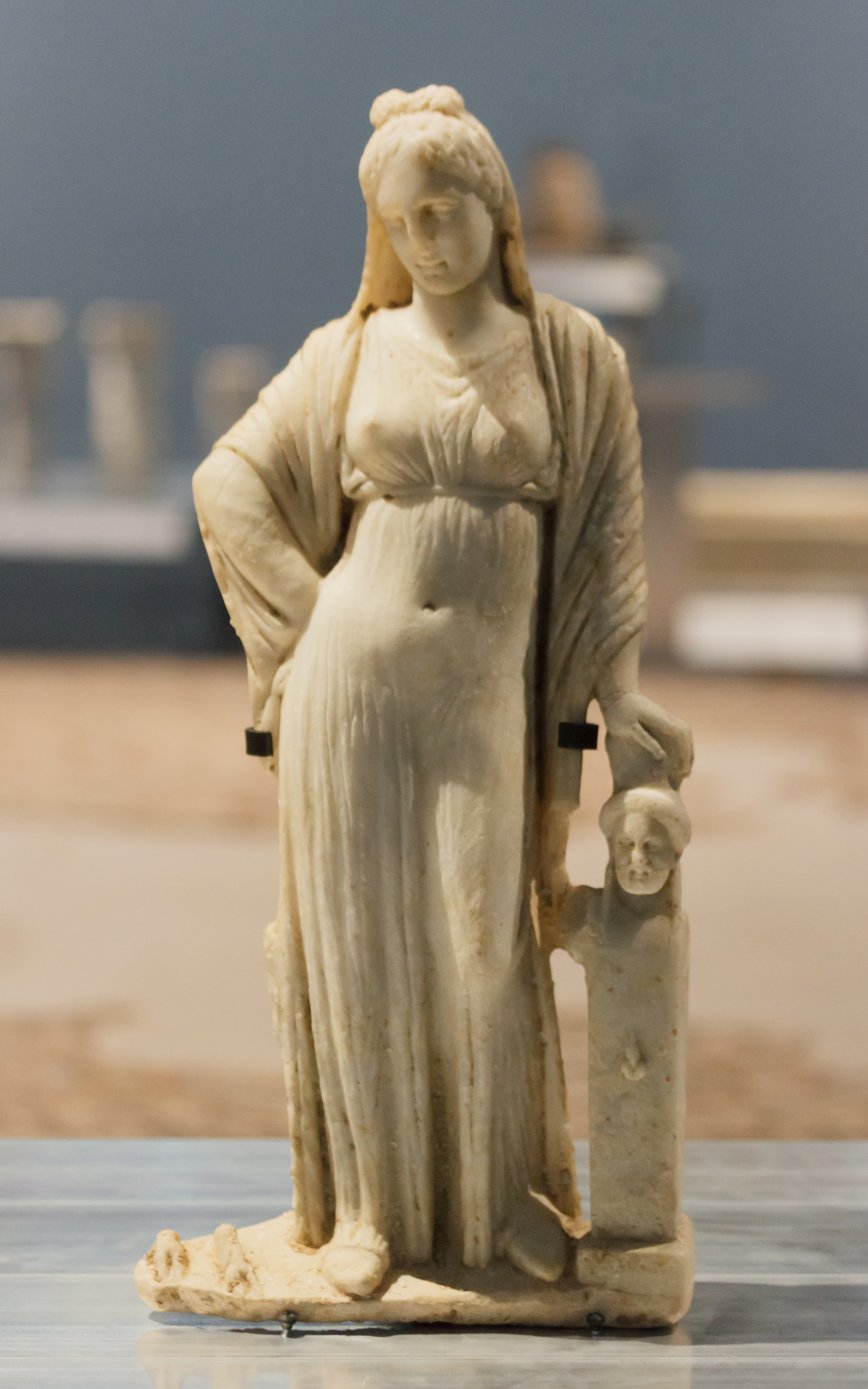
A sculpture of Aphrodite or Hecate found off the coast of Blakhiya was exhibited at the Musée d'Art et d'Histoire (Geneva) in 2025 as part of Saved Treasures of Gaza: 5000 Years of History.

The cemetery was discovered in 1995 during planned construction works in the area. Preliminary investigations uncovered two tombs and demonstrated that the site dated to the Byzantine period. A rescue excavation followed in July 1996 to record the site ahead of the construction. The research was conducted jointly by the Department of Antiquities of Gaza and the École Biblique. The archaeologists investigating the cemetery suggested that it was linked to Anthedon, a nearby port.

Construction on the planned building began in 1996. It was originally intended to be an office building, and after a change of plans and suspension of works during the Second Intifada it opened as the Al-Mashtal Hotel in 2011. The hotel was destroyed in late 2023 during the Israeli invasion of the Gaza Strip.

Archaeological features near Blakhiya Byzantine cemetery making up Anthedon

== See also ==
- Destruction of cultural heritage during the Gaza war
- List of archaeological sites in the Gaza Strip
