= Nazla =

Nazla نزلة Nazle
- Town
- Al-Nazlah
- Interactive map of Nazla نزلة
- Location in Gaza Strip
- Coordinates: 31°31′58″N 34°28′56″E
- Country: Palestine
- Governorate: North Gaza Governorate
- City: Jabalia
- Time zone: UTC+2 (EET)
  - Summer (DST): +3

Nazla (Arabic: نزلة; also spelled al-Nazlah, Nazle, Annazla or en-Nuzleh) is a Palestinian town in the Gaza Strip, in the North Gaza Governorate of the State of Palestine. It was formerly a municipality but was merged with the nearby city of Jabalia. Nazla is located a few kilometers north of Gaza City.

== History ==
Nazla has been identified as the site of the Byzantine-era town of Asalea (Ασαλέα in Greek). Asalea belonged to the city of Gaza during that period. A celebrated Christian figure in Byzantine Gaza was Alaphion of Asalea who was known to be pious and was one of the early missionaries who helped spread Christianity in the area. In the 6th century Madaba Map, Asalea is marked by three towers, a gate and a segment of a wall.

=== Ottoman era ===
In 1863, the French explorer Victor Guérin found the village to have about 150 inhabitants.

An Ottoman village list of about 1870 showed that Nazle had 114 houses and a population of 414, though the population count included only men.

In 1883, the PEF's Survey of Western Palestine (SWP) described Nazla as a "small hamlet" and a suburb of Jabalia. To the east of Nazla was a well.

=== British mandate era ===
In the 1922 census of Palestine conducted by the British Mandate authorities, Nazla had a population of 694, all Muslim, increasing in the 1931 census to 944, still all Muslims, in 226 houses.

In the 1945 statistics Nazla had a population of 1,330, all Muslims, with 4,510 dunams of land, according to an official land and population survey. Of this, 36 dunams were for citrus and bananas, 547 for plantations and irrigable land, 1,141 used for cereals, while 24 dunams were built-up land.

=== 1948, and after ===
During Egyptian rule following the 1948 Arab–Israeli War, Nazla was one of six localities to establish a village council to administer its affairs. Israel occupied the Gaza Strip during the 1967 Six-Day War. In the 1970s and 1980s, Israel developed building projects in Nazla, offering Palestinian refugee families subsidized rates to resettle there.

== Bibliography ==
- Barron, J.B., ed. (1923). Palestine: Report and General Abstracts of the Census of 1922. Government of Palestine.
- Bingham, J. (1834). Origines Ecclesiasticæ: Or, The Antiquities of the Christian Church, and Other Works, of the Rev. Joseph Bingham; with a Set of Maps of Ecclesiastical Geography, to which are Now Added, Several Sermons, and Other Matter, Never Before Published. Vol. 7. William Straker.
- Bitton-Askeloni, Bruria; Kofsky, Arieh (2004). Christian Gaza In Late Antiquity. BRILL. ISBN 978-90-04-13868-1.
- Conder, C.R.; Kitchener, H.H. (1883). The Survey of Western Palestine: Memoirs of the Topography, Orography, Hydrography, and Archaeology. Vol. 3. London: Committee of the Palestine Exploration Fund.
- Department of Statistics (1945). Village Statistics, April, 1945. Government of Palestine.
- Dishon (1973). Middle East Record 1968. Vol. 4. John Wiley & Sons. ISBN 0470216115.
- Guérin, V. (1869). Description Géographique Historique et Archéologique de la Palestine (in French). Vol. 1: Judee, pt. 2. Paris: L'Imprimerie Nationale.
- Hadawi, S. (1970). Village Statistics of 1945: A Classification of Land and Area ownership in Palestine. Palestine Liberation Organization Research Center.
- Hartmann, M. (1883). "Die Ortschaftenliste des Liwa Jerusalem in dem türkischen Staatskalender für Syrien auf das Jahr 1288 der Flucht (1871)". Zeitschrift des Deutschen Palästina-Vereins. 6: 102–149.
- Mills, E., ed. (1932). Census of Palestine 1931. Population of Villages, Towns and Administrative Areas. Jerusalem: Government of Palestine.
- Palmer, E.H. (1881). The Survey of Western Palestine: Arabic and English Name Lists Collected During the Survey by Lieutenants Conder and Kitchener, R. E. Transliterated and Explained by E.H. Palmer. Committee of the Palestine Exploration Fund.
- Roy, S. (1995). The Gaza Strip: The Political Economy of De-Development. Institute for Palestine Studies. ISBN 0887282601.
- Shahwan, Usama Salim (2003). Public Administration in Palestine: Past and Present. University Press of America. ISBN 0761826882.
- Socin, A. (1879). "Alphabetisches Verzeichniss von Ortschaften des Paschalik Jerusalem". Zeitschrift des Deutschen Palästina-Vereins. 2: 135–163.
