= Anthedon (Palestine) =

Hellenistic city near Gaza

Coordinates: 31°32′11″N 34°28′47″E

Anthedon (Ancient Greek: Ἀνθηδών, lit. 'Flower City'), also referred to as Al-Balakhiyya, was a Hellenistic city near Gaza. It was first mentioned by Josephus as a city conquered by Alexander Jannaeus alongside Raphia. Pompey removed it from Jewish rule during his conquest of Judaea. Gabinius re-founded and repopulated the city, and later, Augustus incorporated Anthedon into Herod's realm, along with other coastal cities. Herod renamed it Agrippias or Agrippeion in honor of Agrippa, but the name did not endure.

Anthedon's status between Herod's death and the First Jewish–Roman War is uncertain, but it may have become imperial property, such as Iamnia. During the war, Jewish forces destroyed Anthedon along with Gaza and pillaged nearby villages, although it is possible that the city was not totally destroyed.

Anthedon minted coins under Elagabalus and Severus Alexander, possibly also under Caracalla. Some suggest the city may have attained polis status during this period, but this remains speculative. In the 5th century, Sozomen described Anthedon as pagan and idolatrous. The town had bishops participating in church councils in Ephesus, Chalcedon and Jerusalem.

Ancient Anthedon is identified with Khirbet Teda, an archaeological site near Beit Lahia, in the present-day Gaza Strip, where excavations uncovered evidence of habitation from the Iron Age to the Byzantine and Islamic periods, including Hellenistic houses, Roman structures, and Byzantine tombs, though detailed findings are yet to be published.

== Site and archaeology ==
Ancient Anthedon is located in the Gaza Strip, at Tell Iblakhiye or Balakhiyyah, 2 kilometres (1.2 mi) north of the port of Gaza. It has been identified with Tida or Theda, a site near Beit Lahiya known from medieval Arab sources. Immediately to the north of it there is a hill still called Teda; the name seems to be a corruption of "Anthedon". Some parts of the city wall are still standing, and port structures are visible: they were explored by a Franco-Palestinian archaeological expedition between 1995 and 2005, under the direction of Father Jean-Baptiste Humbert. Potsherds have also been found in the dunes. In 2023, archaeologists announced the discovery of a Roman-era cemetery, dubbed Ard al-Moharbeen Necropolis, with over 100 graves including ornate tombs in which coins for passage to the underworld were placed inside the mouths of the deceased.

Artefacts found at Anthedon and exhibited at Saved Treasures of Gaza: 5000 Years of History

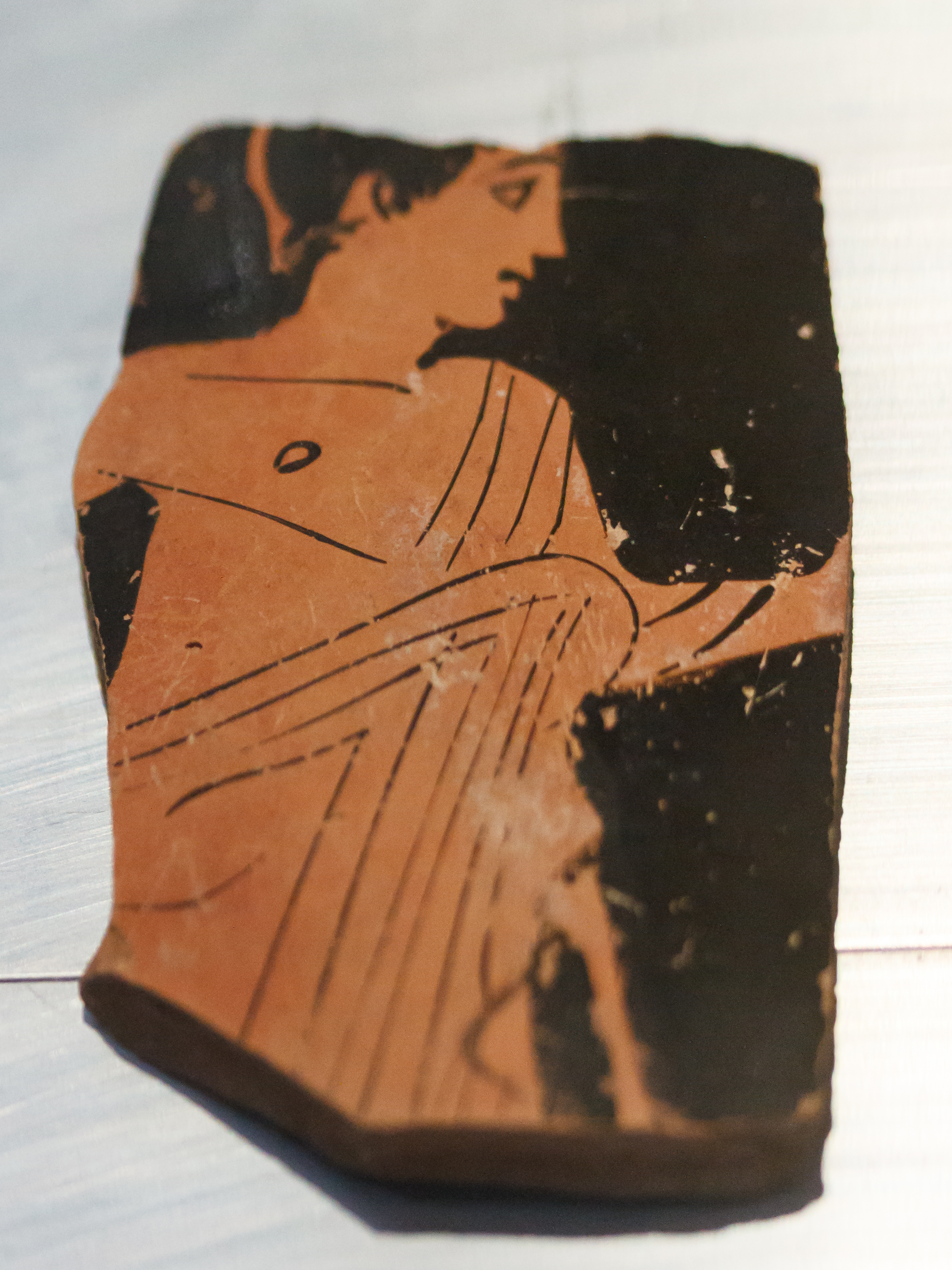
5th-century BCE pottery sherd

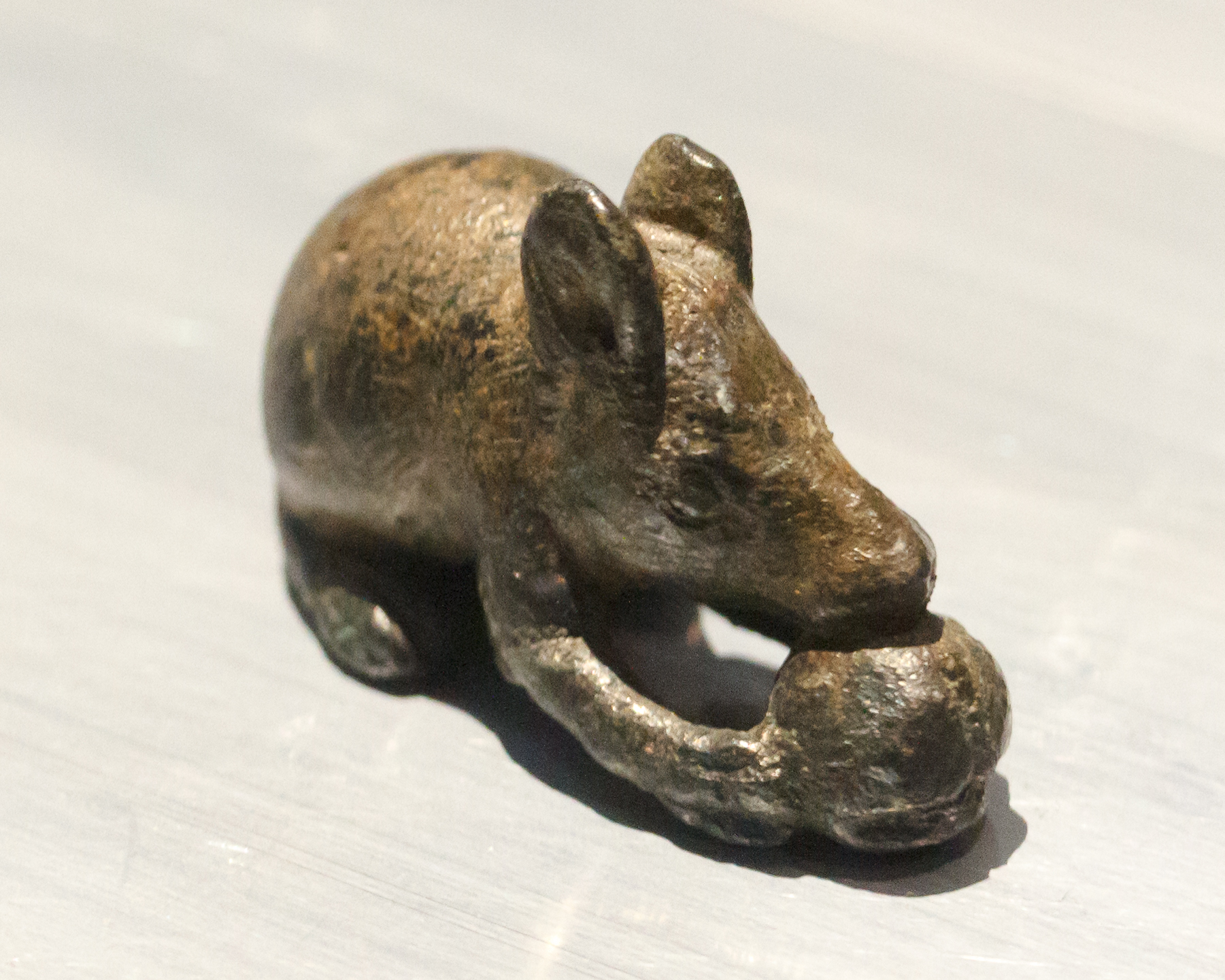
Bronze mouse dated between 64BCE and 313 CE

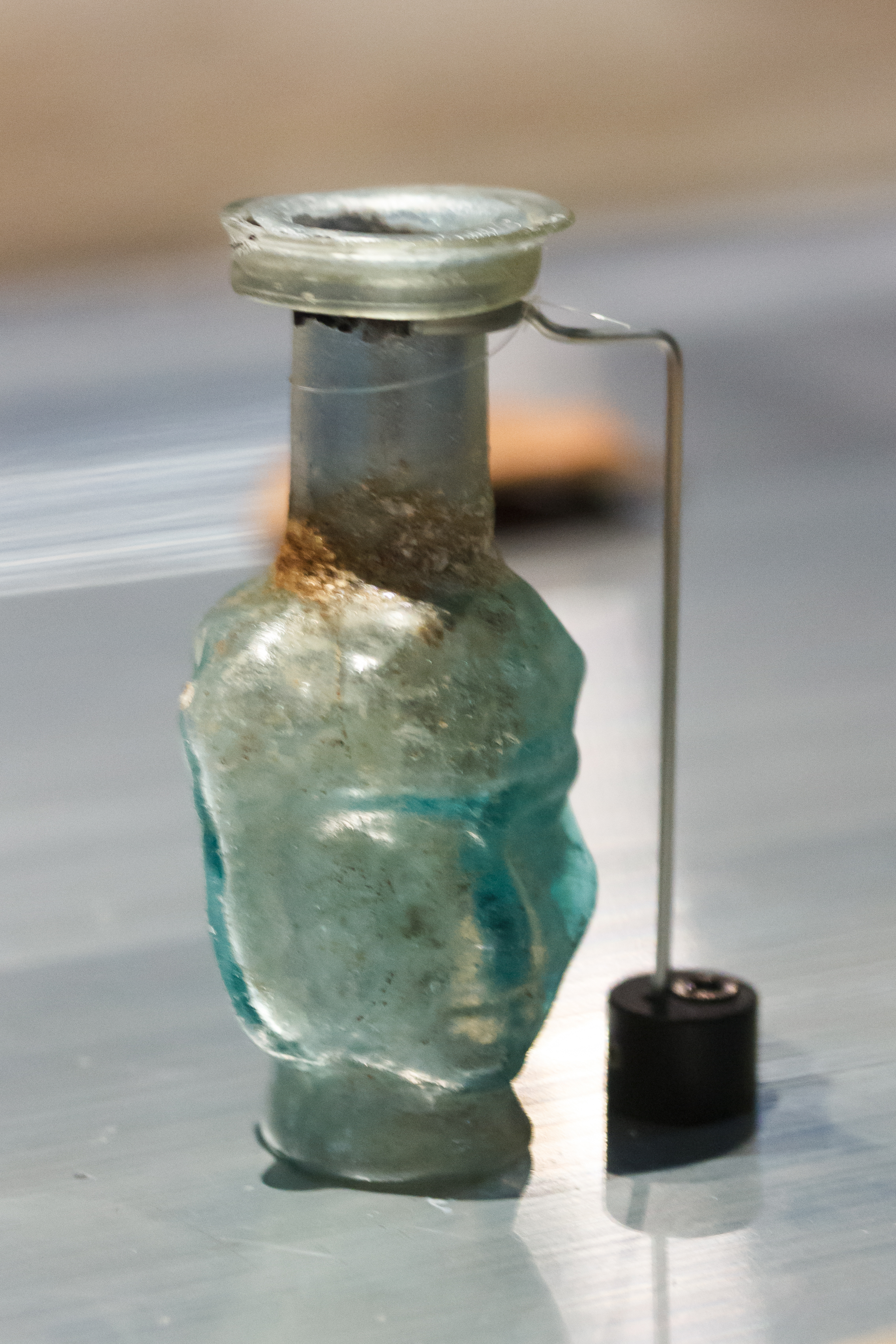
Glass vessel with a face, dated to the 1st or 2nd century CE

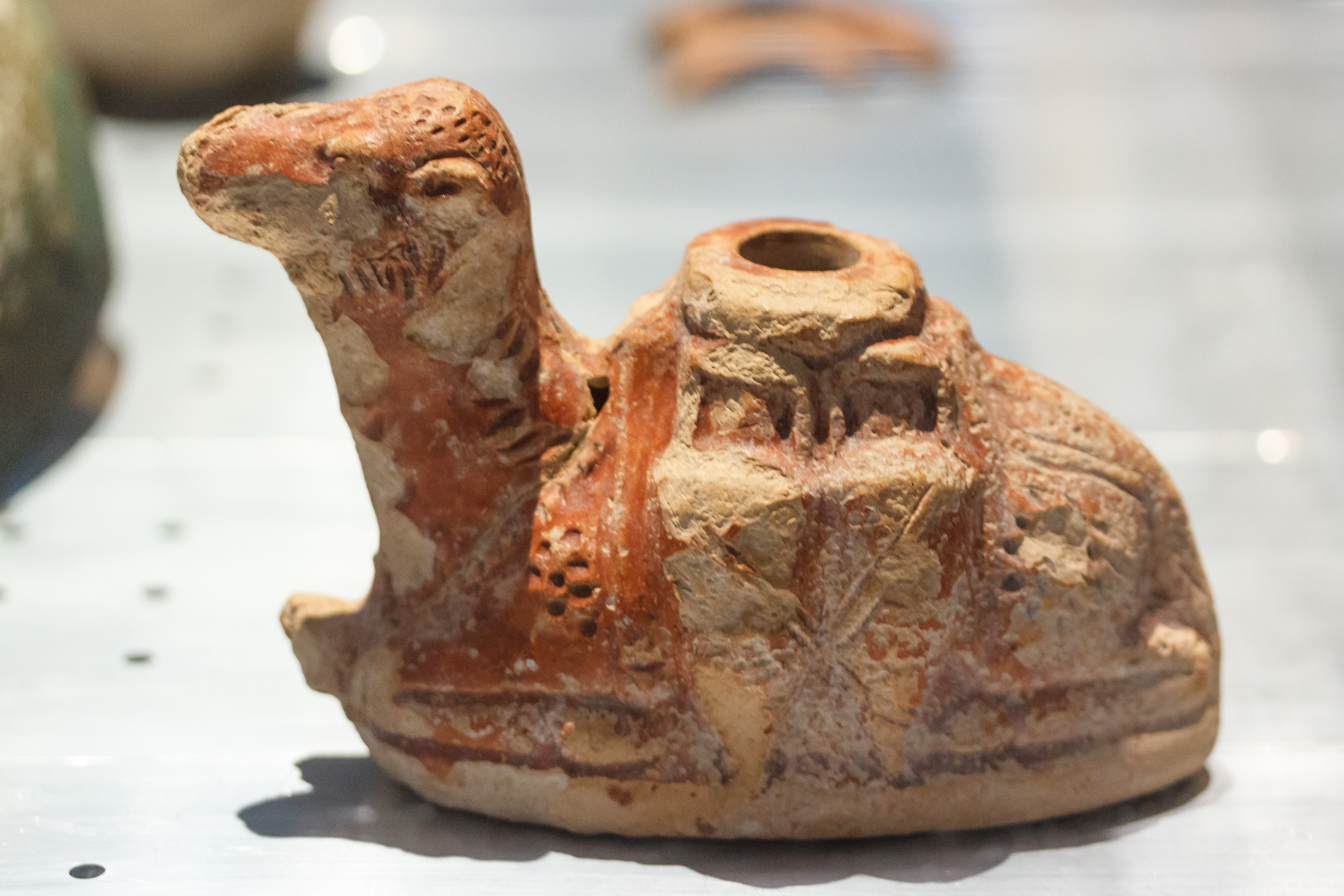
6th-century camel flagon

== History ==
Located between Gaza and Ascalon, the city served as one of the two ports of Gaza, along with Maiuma. As the Persian empire replaced its Assyrian predecessor in 539 BCE and substantially expanded its realm, Greek immigrants, probably coming from Anthedon in Boeotia, took advantage of the new commercial opportunities and founded the new Anthedon of Palestine around the year 520 BCE. This was documented by archaeological excavations jointly executed from 1996 onwards by the Palestinian Authority and the French École Biblique of Jerusalem. As a Hellenistic Greek city, it had an agora and temples. The citizens' life was chiefly dedicated to fishing and shipbuilding. The city was governed by a boule (council) of 500 members and had its own army commanded by a strategos.

Anthedon is first mentioned by Flavius Josephus in Jewish Antiquities, dealing with the period when it was captured by the Hasmonean ruler of Judea, Alexander Jannaeus, and destroyed. In 64 BCE, it was captured by Roman general Pompey and subsequently rebuilt by his successor Gabinius. Later, Anthedon along with coastal sections of Judaea, passed into the hands of Cleopatra and then to Augustus (Octavian), who assigned it to Herod. Herod renamed the city Agrippias in honor of Agrippa, a Roman general and son-in-law of Octavian Augustus. During the First Jewish-Roman War (AD 66–70), the city was attacked by the rebels.

On April 2, 2012, the ancient city was listed as a tentative World Heritage Site by Palestine.

In 2013, the Izz ad-Din al-Qassam Brigades, the military wing of Hamas, bulldozed part of the harbour to expand its military training zone. The Deputy Minister of Tourism in Gaza, Muhammad Khela, said the site would not be damaged by the expansion, despite criticism from local activists and the UNESCO office in Gaza.

In 2023 during the Gaza war, the Balakhiyah (Anthedon) site was listed by a cultural heritage preservation report as completely destroyed by direct shelling. As well as airstrikes, the site was further damaged by demolition activities, the movements of military vehicles, and the installation of pumps.

== Ecclesiastical history ==
Anthedon was important enough in the Byzantine province of Palestina Prima (395–636) to become a suffragan bishopric of its capital's Metropolitan Archbishop of Caesarea in Palestina, but later faded.

In the 4th century AD, the city became an episcopal seat, though traditional multitheism, particularly the worship of Venus and Astarte, survived there until the 5th century according to Sozomenus. The latter informs us about one Zenon, brother of Nestabus and Eusebius (both martyred in AD 362 as a result of prosecution by Julian the Apostate) who fled to Anthedon. The pagan townsfolk, upon learning that he was a Christian, beat him and drove him out of town. Later on, this Zenon went on to become bishop of Maiuma, the other port of Gaza.

A celebrated Christian figure was Aurelius the Anthedonian who was known to be pious and helped spread Christianity in the area.

The first known bishop of Anthedon was Paul, who took part in the Councils of Ephesus (431) and Chalcedon (451). Bishop Eustathius took part in the Council of Jerusalem (518), and Bishop Dorotheus in the Council of Jerusalem (536).

=== Titular see ===
Anthedon is no longer a residential bishopric and is listed by the Catholic Church as a titular bishopric.

It has been vacant for decades. A notable holder of the title of the lowest (episcopal) rank was Marcel-François Lefebvre of the Holy Ghost Fathers (C.S.Sp.), appointed in 1947.

== See also ==
- Syro-Palestinian archaeology
- Blakhiya Byzantine cemetery – burial place near Anthedon, used 3rd to 5th centuries
- List of archaeological sites in the Gaza Strip
