= Ard-al-Moharbeen necropolis =

Archaeological site in Palestine

- Roman Cemetery Beit Lahia
- Location within State of Palestine
- 31°32′55″N 34°27′59″E
- Type: Inhumation cemetery
- Periods: Roman
- Location: Jabaliya, Gaza Strip, Palestine

Site notes
- Area: 4,000 square metres (43,000 sq ft) (estimated)
- Excavation dates: 2023
- Archaeologists: René Elter
- Discovered: 2022

The Ard-al-Moharbeen necropolis was a Roman cemetery in the Gaza Strip, Palestine. The known extent covers an estimated 4,000 square metres (43,000 sq ft) and is the largest cemetery to have been discovered in Gaza. It is thought to have been in use from the 1st century AD to the 3rd century AD and was close to the Roman town of Anthedon.

The necropolis was discovered in 2022 during building works in Jabaliya. Archaeologists led by René Elter began excavating the following year and had discovered 135 graves by the time investigations were cut short by the outbreak of the Gaza war. The graves included two lead sarcophagi which were the first of their kind found in Gaza and likely belonged to wealthy people. Archaeologists also found burials where the occupants had been interred with a "Charon's obol" in their mouths, a Greco-Roman burial practice. The cemetery was damaged by bombing and bulldozing during the Gaza war, one of hundreds of cultural heritage sites damaged in the conflict.

== Background ==
The Ard al-Moharbeen necropolis is close to the location of Anthedon (also known as Blakhiya) and likely served as its cemetery. Anthedon was a coastal town and port inhabited from about 800 BC to 1100 AD, spanning the Iron Age to the early Muslim period. The nearby Blakhiya Byzantine cemetery was used from the 3rd to 5th centuries and also was probably connected to Anthedon.

Preliminary works for construction projects in the Gaza Strip have often encountered archaeological remains, and much of the archaeology in the region has related to salvage excavations such as the works at Tell es-Sakan and Anthedon. The blockade of the Gaza Strip has hampered archaeological work by restricting access to necessary tools; from 2017 Première Urgence Internationale began training students in Gaza and providing fieldwork opportunities.

== Discovery and investigation ==
The cemetery was discovered in early 2022 during construction work for a housing project in Jabaliya. (Note: There are conflicting reports of the discovery date: January 2022 according to The Art Newspaper; late January according to the archaeologist who led the excavations, René Elter; and February 2022 according to Reuters.) A team of archaeologists led by René Elter and Première Urgence Internationale and with funding from the École Biblique began excavations in July 2023. The discovery was announced later that month. 30 graduates from the University of Palestine and the Islamic University of Gaza were involved in the excavation. The team had been training to investigate the Saint Hilarion Monastery as part of a long-term archaeological project.

The Israeli invasion of the Gaza Strip beginning in October 2023 led to hundreds of heritage sites being damaged. Using satellite imagery dated to 8 October research group Forensic Architecture identified craters at the archaeological site left by exploded rockets. In November 2023, Jehad Yasin of the Ministry of Tourism and Antiquities reported that the cemetery was "almost completely destroyed". The Israeli military told the BBC that it had targeted "a Hamas military compound used for operational purposes".

UNESCO conducted remote monitoring of cultural heritage sites in the Gaza Strip and confirmed damage to the cemetery in its January 2024 assessment. (Note: Qasr al-Basha was also damaged by Israeli bombardment.) A 2025 report by the Centre for Cultural Heritage Preservation judged the site to be severely damaged, with a combination of bomb and bulldozer damage, while the demolition of nearby structures is expected to have left additional debris at the cemetery.

== Cemetery features ==
The Ard-al-Moharbeen necropolis is the largest cemetery discovered in Gaza and 135 graves have been identified in an area of 4,000 square metres (43,000 sq ft). The tombs themselves were typically made from stone or mudbrick, and one contained painted plaster. Others were built with a pitched roof creating a gable effect. Most of the graves still contained human remains. Some of the graves contained objects buried with the dead (grave goods); the objects include clay pots, perfume bottles, and some skeletons were found with coins in their mouths. The latter was a Greco-Roman practice referred to as "Charon's obol" and was intended to pay the ferryman Charon for deceased's entry to the underworld. The grave goods provided evidence of Gaza's trade connections as they were produced in the Mediterranean and Nabataea.

Amongst the burials were two lead sarcophagi, the first to be discovered in Gaza. They date to the 2nd or 3rd centuries AD, and likely belonged to wealthier people than others buried in the necropolis. One of the sarcophagi was taken to Qasr al-Basha, a museum in Gaza, for display to the public. It is thought that some of the burials are of high-status Roman officials. According to Elter, the burials are thought to date from the 1st century AD to the 3rd century AD. (Note: Preliminary interpretations in 2023 suggested a range of 1st century BC to 2nd century AD.) Several burials were looted during the 8th and 9th centuries.

== See also ==
- Fadel al-Utol – archaeologist involved in the cemetery excavations
- List of archaeological sites in the Gaza Strip
- Israeli razing of cemeteries and necroviolence against Palestinians
- Saved Treasures of Gaza: 5000 Years of History – an exhibition of finds from sites in Gaza
