= September 23, 2005, Jabalia Camp incident =

Deadly 2005 incident in the Gaza Strip related to the Israeli-Palestinian conflict

The September 23, 2005 Jabalia Camp incident happened when Hamas was holding a rally or a parade in the Jabalia refugee camp in the Gaza Strip, following the Israeli disengagement from Gaza. At least 19 Palestinians, both militants and civilians, were killed in what was described as an explosion or a series of explosions. At least two children were among the dead. Additionally, over 80 Palestinians were injured.

The origin of these explosions was disputed. Hamas described the incident as an Israeli airstrike. A Hamas spokesperson said, "I saw the missiles with my two own eyes and thousands of people saw these missiles coming". However, Israel denied having anything to do with the blast.

Officials of the Palestinian Authority (headed by Fatah) claimed that Hamas members accidentally caused the explosion. Hamas claimed the rockets displayed during the rally could not have exploded as they were dummies, not real rockets.

== Background and aftermath ==
Prior to the incident (on the same day), Israeli forces raided a house in Tulkarem, West Bank, killing three Islamic Jihad members. (Note: The September 23 raid is not to be confused with the August 24 shooting in Tulkarem in which Israeli forces killed five unarmed Palestinians, including three teenagers. In the aftermath of the August 24 shooting, Israel offered an apology. In the September 23 raid, the three persons killed were actual Islamic Jihad members, according to Israel.) Islamic Jihad responded by firing rockets on Israel, after which the IDF reportedly dispatched an Apache helicopter over Gaza. According to some Hamas members, that helicopter was the source of the airstrike on their rally in Jabalia.

After the incident, Palestinian militants fired rockets on Israel, wounding at least five Israeli civilians. Israel responded with numerous strikes on targets in Gaza, killing at least two Hamas militants and wounding at least 29 Palestinians, including civilians.

== Similar incidents ==
In March 2006, Khaled Dahdouh of the Islamic Jihad was killed in a car explosion for which no group, Israeli or Palestinian, took responsibility. In this case no civilians were killed, although two people were injured.
