= 2021 Jabalia accident =

Accident

- Part of the 2021 Israel–Palestine crisis
- Date: 10 May 2021
- Location: Jabalia, Gaza Strip; 31°31′34.1″N 34°28′59.4″E
- Organized by: Hamas
- Deaths: 7
- Injuries: 15

On 10 May 2021, during the 2021 Israel–Palestine crisis, a rocket fired by Hamas towards Israel misfired and fell inside the Gaza Strip city of Jabalia, killing seven people.

Hamas authorities said that they had launched the rocket around 6 pm from the Sheikh Radwan neighborhood of Gaza City.

According to Human Rights Watch (HRW), the rocket had accidentally hit a shop on Martyr Salah Dardona Street near the Al-Omari mosque. Seven people were killed, including a four-year-old and a teenager. 15 people were reportedly injured, including five children.

HRW said that witnesses had told them the rockets appeared to be unguided BM-21 Grads; HRW described the use of such missiles as a war crime.

== See also ==
- Al-Ahli Arab Hospital explosion
