= Jabalia =

City in northern Gaza, Palestine

Jabalia جباليا
- Municipality type A (City)

Arabic transcription(s)
  - Arabic: جباليا
  - Latin: Jabalya (official)
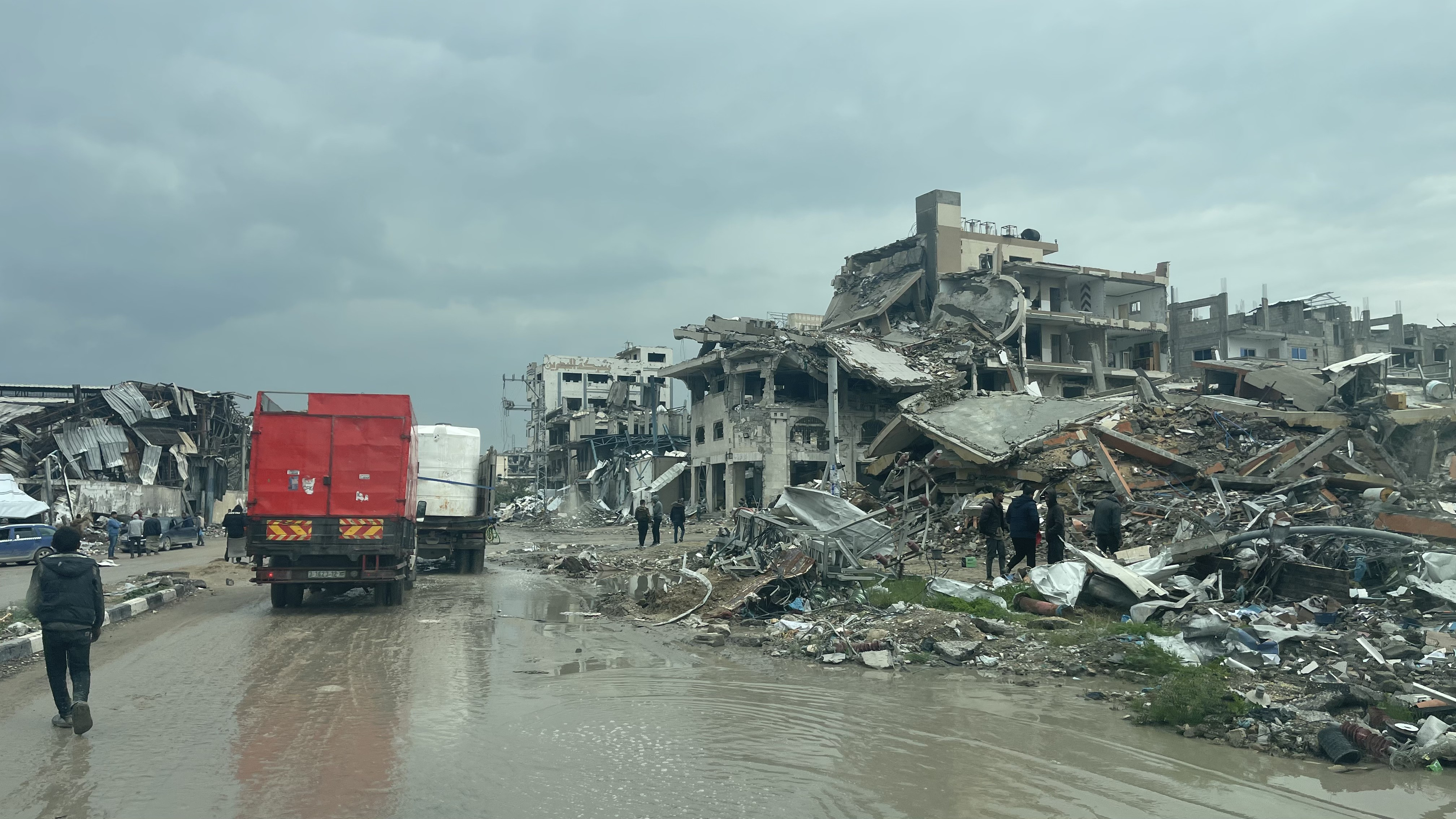
- Ruins of Jabalia, in February 2025
- Interactive map of Jabalia
- Location of Jabalia within Palestine
- Coordinates: 31°31′41″N 34°28′59″E
- Palestine grid: 100/103
- State: State of Palestine
- Governorate: North Gaza

Government
  - Type: City
  - Mayor: M. Mazen Al-Abd Al-Najjar

Population (2017)
  - Total: 172,704
- Name meaning: "The mountaineers"
- Website: www.jabalia.ps

Jabalia, also spelled Jabalya (Arabic: جباليا), is a city in the Gaza Strip, Palestine, located 4 kilometers (2.5 mi) north of Gaza City, in the North Gaza Governorate of the Gaza Strip. According to the Palestinian Central Bureau of Statistics, Jabalia had a population of 172,704 in 2017. In addition to Jabalia, the city municipality contains the Jabalia refugee camp and the town of Nazla, the latter of which was an independent village council before being merged with Jabalia.

== History ==
From the 1st century CE to the 3rd century CE, during the Roman period, there was a cemetery in use at Jabalia; archaeologists named it the Ard-al-Moharbeen necropolis. The burials may have included high-status officials.

During the Byzantine period, there was a church at Jabalia. The church was likely established in the 5th century and used into the 8th century. No contemporary settlement nearby had been identified, and the archaeologist Jean-Baptiste Humbert suggested that the church may have been part of a necropolis for Gaza. Byzantine ceramics have also been found in Jabalia.

Jabalia was known for its fertile soil and citrus trees. The Mamluk Governor of Gaza Sanjar al-Jawli ruled the area in the early 14th century and endowed part of Jabalia's land to the al-Shamah Mosque he built in Gaza.

Until 2014, Jabalia also had the ancient Omari Mosque. The site was believed to have housed a mosque since the 7th century, and its portico and minaret dated back to the 14th century, but the Omari was destroyed by Israeli bombings in 2014. The portico consists of three arcades supported by four stone columns. The arcades have pointed arches and the portico is covered by crossing vaults.

=== Ottoman period ===
Incorporated into the Ottoman Empire in 1517 with all of Palestine, Jabalia appeared in 1596 tax registers as being in the Nahiya of Gaza of the Liwa of Gazza. It had a population of 331 households, all Muslim, who paid taxes on wheat, barley, vine yards, and fruit trees; a total of 37,640 akçe. 2/3 of the revenue went to a waqf.

In 1838, Edward Robinson noted Jebalia as a Muslim village, located in the Gaza district.

In 1863, Victor Guérin found in the mosque fragments of old constructions, and at the well some broken columns. He further noted: "This village, towards the west, borders on the dunes of the coast. It is surrounded, on the other three sides, by fertile gardens, separated from each other by hedges of cacti and other thorny shrubs. Cultivated with care, they are planted with fig, pomegranate, almond, apricot, lemon and orange trees. There are also a few apple trees. Residents go to sell their fruit in Gaza's various markets."

An Ottoman village list from about 1870 found that the village had a population of 828, in a total of 254 houses, though the population count included men, only. In the Palestine Exploration Fund's 1883 Survey of Western Palestine, Jabalia was described as being a large adobe village, with gardens and a well on the northwest. It had a mosque named Jamia Abu Berjas.

=== British Mandate era ===
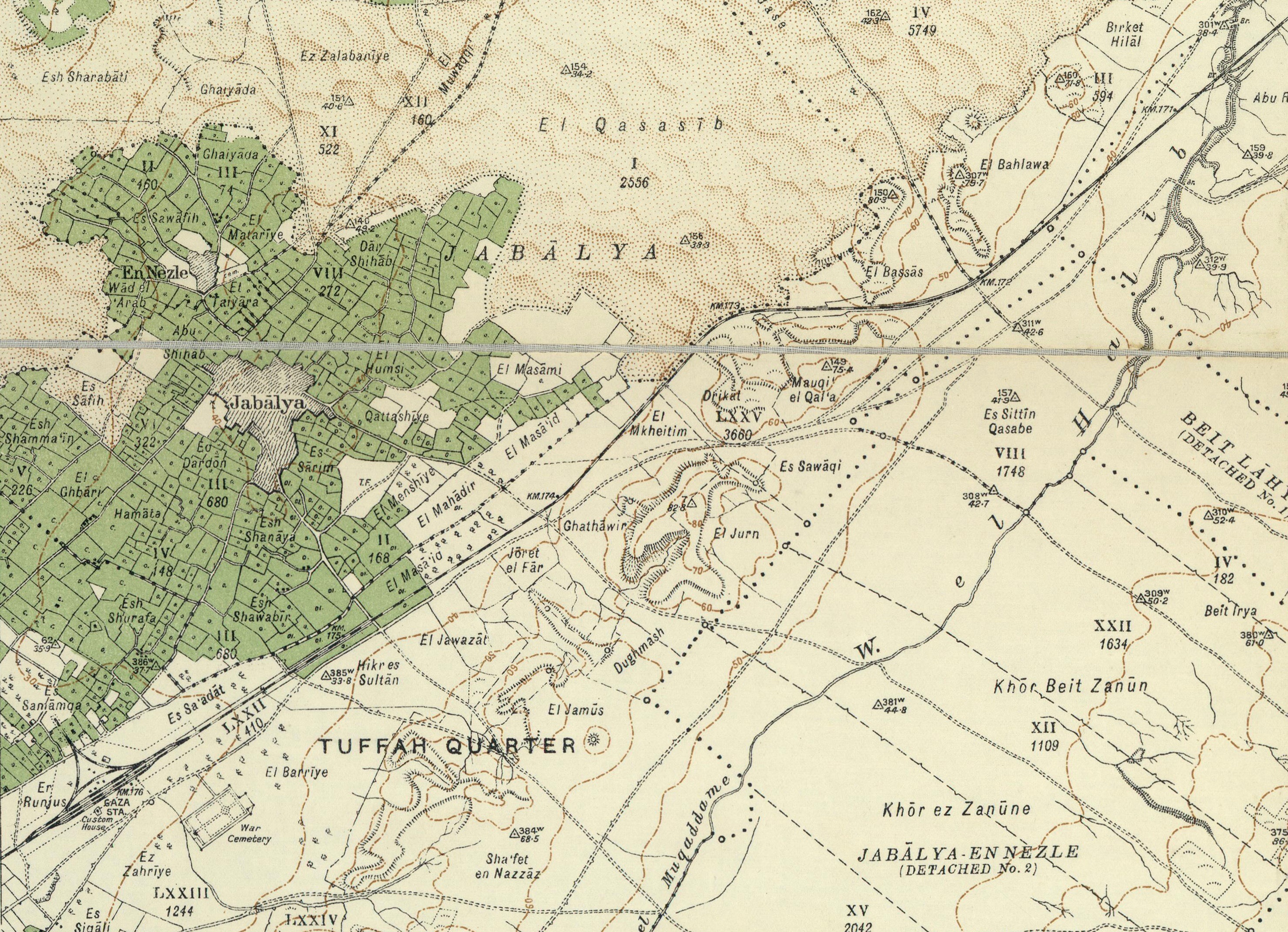
Jabalia 1931 1:20,000

In the 1922 census of Palestine conducted by the British Mandate authorities, Jabalia had a population of 1,775 inhabitants, all Muslim, increasing in the 1931 census to 2,425, still all Muslims, in 631 houses.

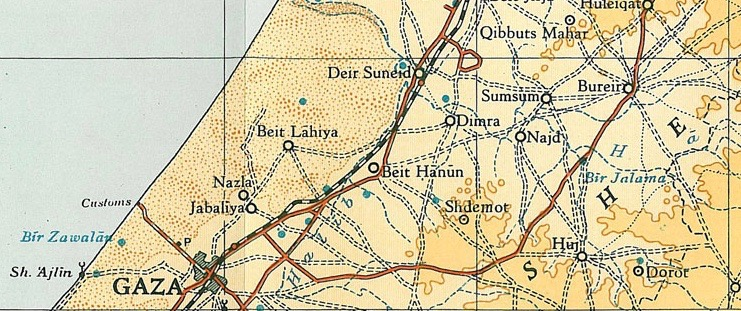
Jabalia 1945 1:250,000

In the 1945 statistics, Jabalia had a population of 3,520, all Muslims, with 11,497 dunams of land, according to an official land and population survey. Of this, 138 dunams were for citrus and bananas, 1,009 for plantations and irrigable land, 1,036 for cereals, while 101 dunams were built-up land.

=== Post-1948 ===
The 1948 Arab–Israeli War led to 750,000 Palestinians being displaced. Refugee camps were established to house the displaced people, including one at Jabalia; the Jabalia camp mostly housed people from southern Palestine. In 1953 UNRWA began building the first permanent structures at the camp.

During the early months of First Intifada on 27 March 1989 Fares S'aid Falcha, aged 50, was beaten by Israeli soldiers. He died 3 weeks later in the Makassed Hospital. A report was compiled by the Military Police Investigators and details were passed on to the Chief Military Prosecutor.

Reconstruction work on the Salah al-Din Road in 1996 led to the discovery of a Byzantine church at Jabalia and its excavation by Ayman Hassouna and Yasser Matar.

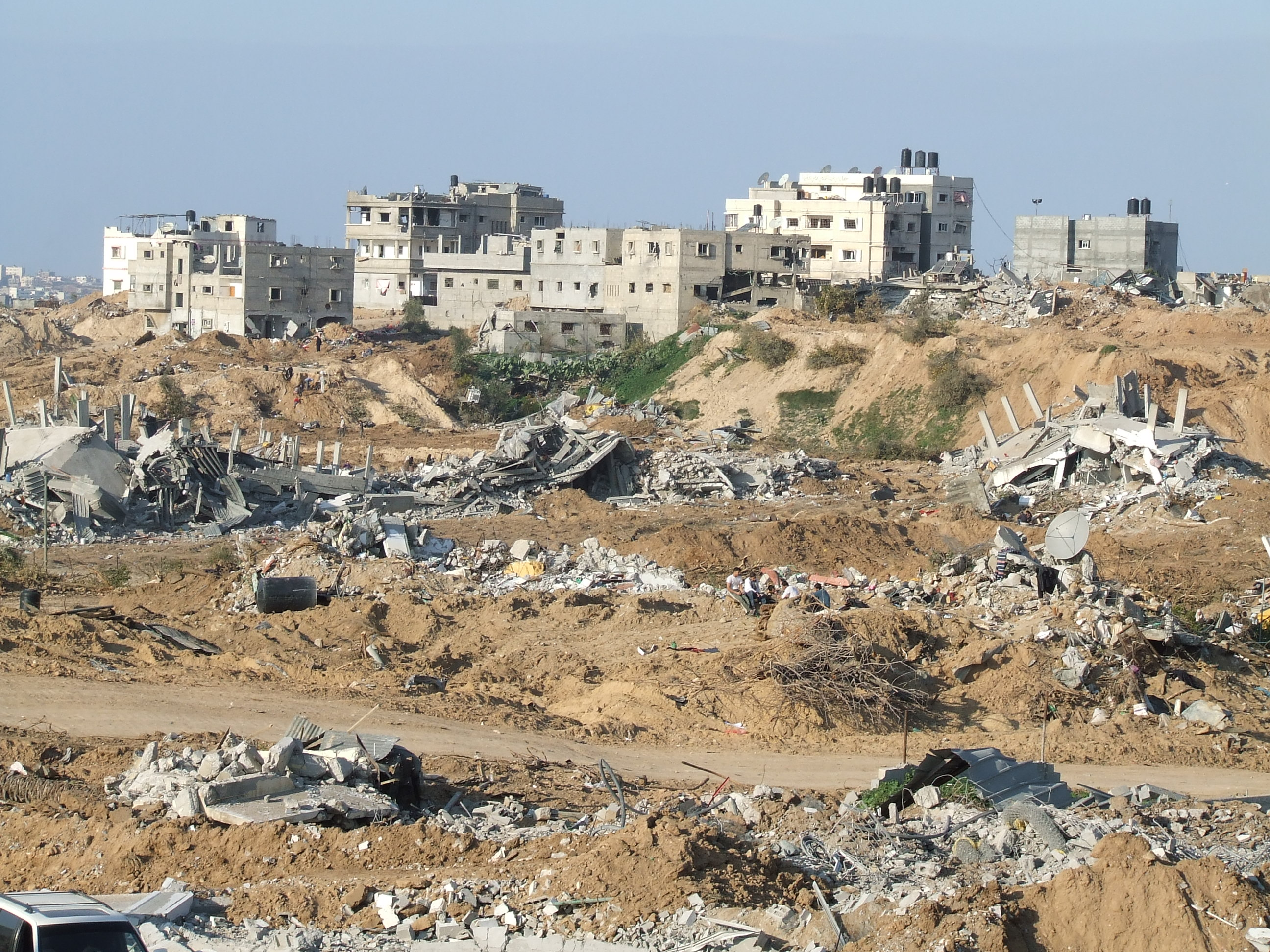
Jabalia after the 2009 Gaza war

In late 2006, Jabalia was the scene of mass protests against airstrikes on homes. Israel contacted the residences of several Hamas members who launched missiles at Israeli civilians from the houses, warning them of an airstrike within the next 30 minutes. Neighbors responded by forming a human shield and successfully stalled the demolition. In 2021, seven people were killed by a Hamas rocket.

After a multi-year restoration project, the Byzantine church at Jabalia opened to the public in January 2022. The following month a Roman cemetery was discovered during the construction of a housing project; archaeologists led by René Elter subsequently found 135 graves in what became known as the Ard-al-Moharbeen necropolis, making it the largest cemetery to have been discovered in Palestine.

=== Gaza war ===
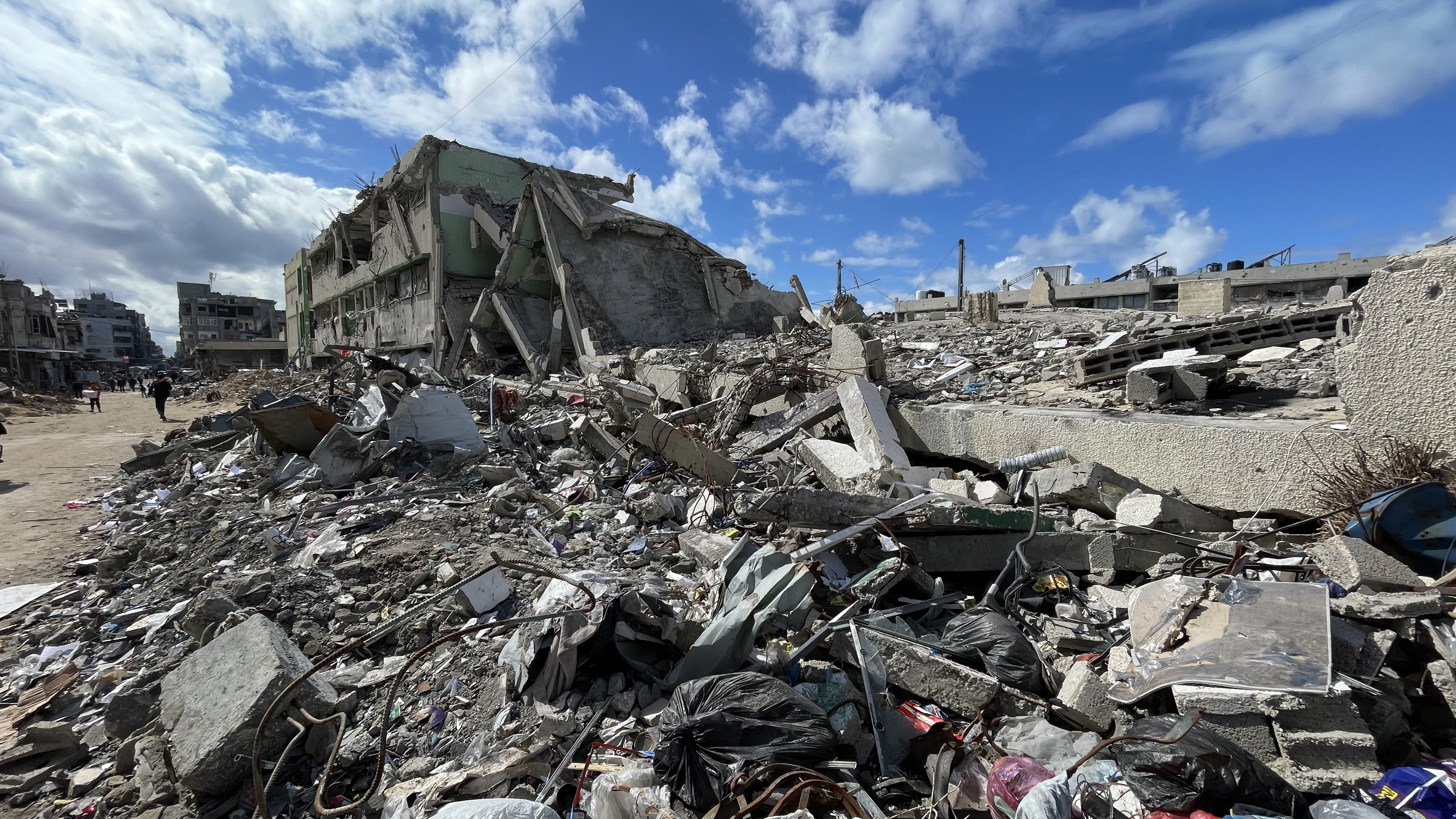
The ruin of Al-Huda Girls' School in Jabalia in 2025

The Jabalia refugee camp, which has been the target of multiple Israeli air strikes during the ongoing Gaza war, was struck again on 31 October. The Israeli air-strike killed at least 50 Palestinians and trapped more than a hundred beneath the rubble, according to the Gaza Health Ministry. The Indonesia Hospital said most casualties were women and children. Gaza Interior Ministry stated the camp had been "completely destroyed," with preliminary estimates of about 400 wounded or dead. IDF spokesperson Daniel Hagari confirmed that Israeli fighter jets attacked the refugee camp, and stated that the attack killed a Hamas commander who led the October 7 attacks, dozens of Palestinian militants, and destroyed Palestinian tunnels. Hamas said none of its commanders were present and that Israel was using these claims as an excuse for the attack. On 4 November, the Al-Fakhoura School in Jabalia was struck; thousands of Palestinians were sheltering in the school and its yard.

The Battle of Jabalia began on 8 November 2023 as part of the 2023 Israeli invasion of the Gaza Strip, and ended its first phase in late January 2024 with an Israeli withdrawal. Following this, Palestinian forces and the IDF intermittently clashed in Jabalia. The mayor of Jabalia stated Israel had destroyed 75 percent of Jabalia's water wells by March 2024.

A May 2024 IDF offensive into the city ended on 31 May 2024 with an IDF withdrawal after over two weeks of intense fighting and more than 200 airstrikes. Palestinian officials said that 70% of the refugee camp was destroyed. The Israeli military said that it had destroyed over 10 kilometers of underground tunnels that it says the militants used. The Israeli military also said that it had destroyed a number of weapons production sites and rocket launchers. During the weeks-long operation, troops recovered the bodies of seven Israeli hostages.

Having failed to dismantle Hamas in Jabalia, the IDF reinvaded the city after four months on 5 October 2024.

After the 10 October 2025 ceasefire in Gaza, Hamas allegedly redeployed members in Jabalia and the refugee camp, where they supposedly launched a crackdown on the Israeli-backed and Popular Forces-affiliated Popular Army – Northern Forces (also known as the People's Army – Northern Forces), allegedly arresting and killing its members. On 14 October 2025, the group's leader, Ashraf Al-Mansi, released a video where he denied the alleged Hamas crackdown. Al-Mansi proclaimed that PANF controls several areas in northern Gaza, and warned Hamas from entering their territory.

== Demographics ==
Jabalia's residents have various origins, including the Hauran, Egypt, and Bedouin communities, as well as people from Hebron and Jaffa.

A number of male pseudohermaphrodite births have been reported in Jabalia. Jehad Abudaia, a Canadian-Palestinian pediatrician and urologist, has suggested that consanguinity due to cousin marriages accounts for the prevalence of pseudohermaphrodite births. In the Gaza Strip, pseudohermaphrodite conditions often go undetected for years after birth due to the region's lower standards of medical treatment and diagnostics.

== Twin towns – sister cities ==
Jabalia is twinned with:

- Ümraniye, Turkey

== Bibliography ==
- Barron, J.B., ed. (1923). Palestine: Report and General Abstracts of the Census of 1922. Government of Palestine.
- Conder, C.R.; Kitchener, H.H. (1883). The Survey of Western Palestine: Memoirs of the Topography, Orography, Hydrography, and Archaeology. Vol. 3. London: Committee of the Palestine Exploration Fund.
- Dauphin, C. (1998). La Palestine byzantine, Peuplement et Populations. BAR International Series 726 (in French). Vol. III : Catalogue. Oxford: Archeopress. ISBN 0-860549-05-4.
- Department of Statistics (1945). Village Statistics, April, 1945. Government of Palestine.
- Guérin, V. (1869). Description Géographique Historique et Archéologique de la Palestine (in French). Vol. 1: Judee, pt. 2. Paris: L'Imprimerie Nationale.
- Hadawi, S. (1970). Village Statistics of 1945: A Classification of Land and Area ownership in Palestine. Palestine Liberation Organization Research Center.
- Hartmann, M. (1883). "Die Ortschaftenliste des Liwa Jerusalem in dem türkischen Staatskalender für Syrien auf das Jahr 1288 der Flucht (1871)". Zeitschrift des Deutschen Palästina-Vereins. 6: 102–149.
- Humbert, Jean-Baptiste (1999). "The rivers of Paradise in the Byzantine Church near Jabaliyah – Gaza". In Piccirillo, Michele; Alliata, Eugenio (eds.). The Madaba Map Centenary 1897–1997: Travelling Through the Byzantine Umayyad Period. Collectio maior. Vol. 40. Jerusalem: Studium Biblicum Franciscanum. pp. 216–218. Archived from the original on 27 February 2009.
- Humbert, Jean-Baptiste; Abu Hassuneh, Yasser; Hassuneh, Aymân; Abu Muhammar, Mahmud (2000). "Mukheitem à Jabaliyah, un site byzantin" [Mukheitem at Jabaliyah, a Byzantine site]. Gaza Méditerranéenne: Histoire et archéologie en Palestine (in French). Éditions Errance. pp. 121–126.
- Hütteroth, W.-D.; Abdulfattah, K. (1977). Historical Geography of Palestine, Transjordan and Southern Syria in the Late 16th Century. Erlanger Geographische Arbeiten, Sonderband 5. Erlangen, Germany: Vorstand der Fränkischen Geographischen Gesellschaft. ISBN 3-920405-41-2.
- Mills, E., ed. (1932). Census of Palestine 1931. Population of Villages, Towns and Administrative Areas. Jerusalem: Government of Palestine.
- Palmer, E.H. (1881). The Survey of Western Palestine: Arabic and English Name Lists Collected During the Survey by Lieutenants Conder and Kitchener, R. E. Transliterated and Explained by E.H. Palmer. Committee of the Palestine Exploration Fund.
- Robinson, E.; Smith, E. (1841). Biblical Researches in Palestine, Mount Sinai and Arabia Petraea: A Journal of Travels in the year 1838. Vol. 3. Boston: Crocker & Brewster.
- Socin, A. (1879). "Alphabetisches Verzeichniss von Ortschaften des Paschalik Jerusalem". Zeitschrift des Deutschen Palästina-Vereins. 2: 135–163.
