= Qalandia =

Palestinian village in the West Bank

Qalandia Kalandia
- Municipality type D (village council)

Arabic transcription(s)
  - Arabic: قلنديا
  - Latin: Qalandiya (unofficial)
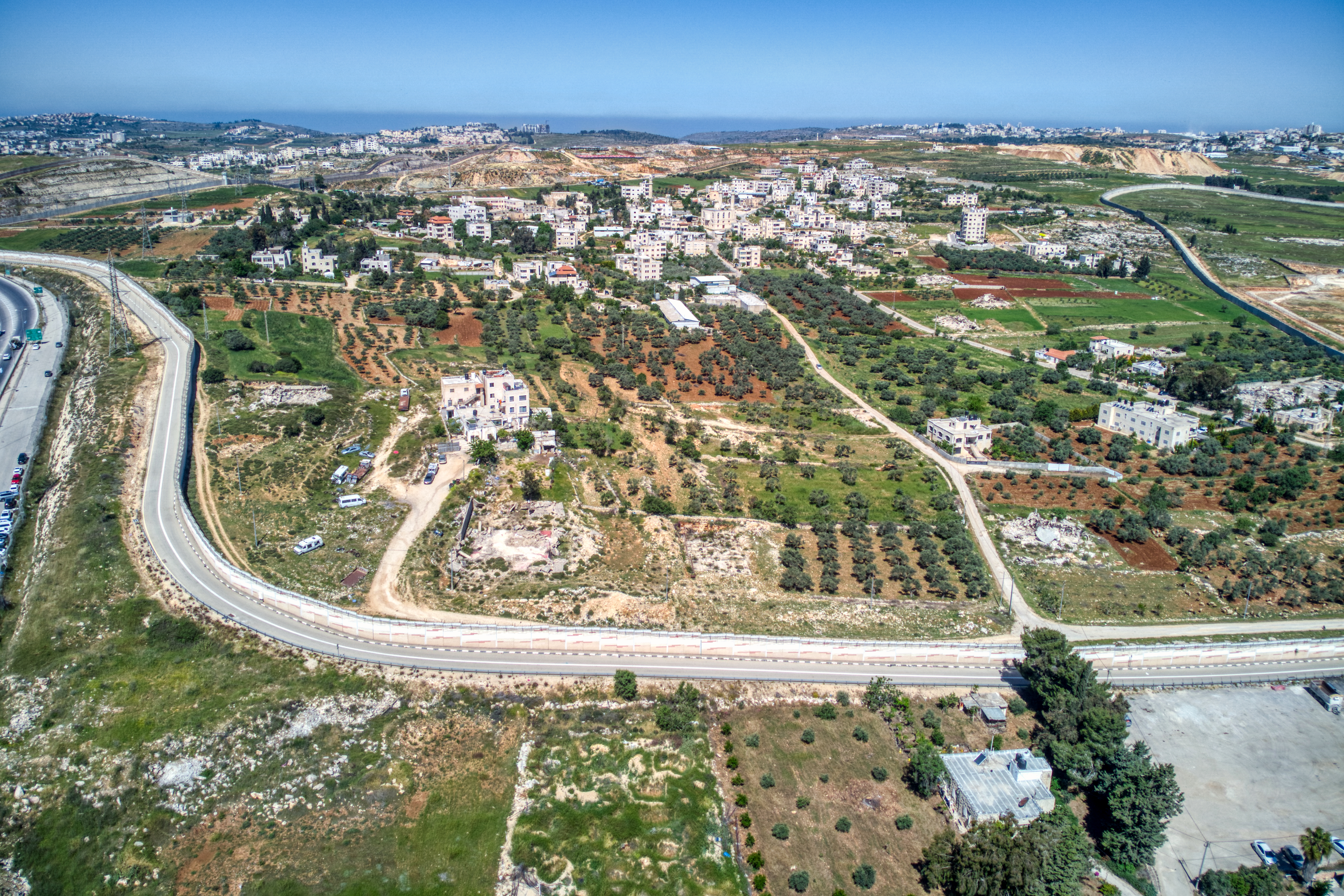
- Qalandia Village

- Location of Qalandia within Palestine
- Coordinates: 31°51′47″N 35°12′27″E
- Palestine grid: 169/141
- State: State of Palestine
- Governorate: Quds

Government
  - Type: Village council

Area
  - Total: 3.3 km^{2} (1.3 sq mi)

Population (2017)
  - Total: 572
  - Density: 170/km^{2} (450/sq mi)
- Name meaning: Kulundia, personal name

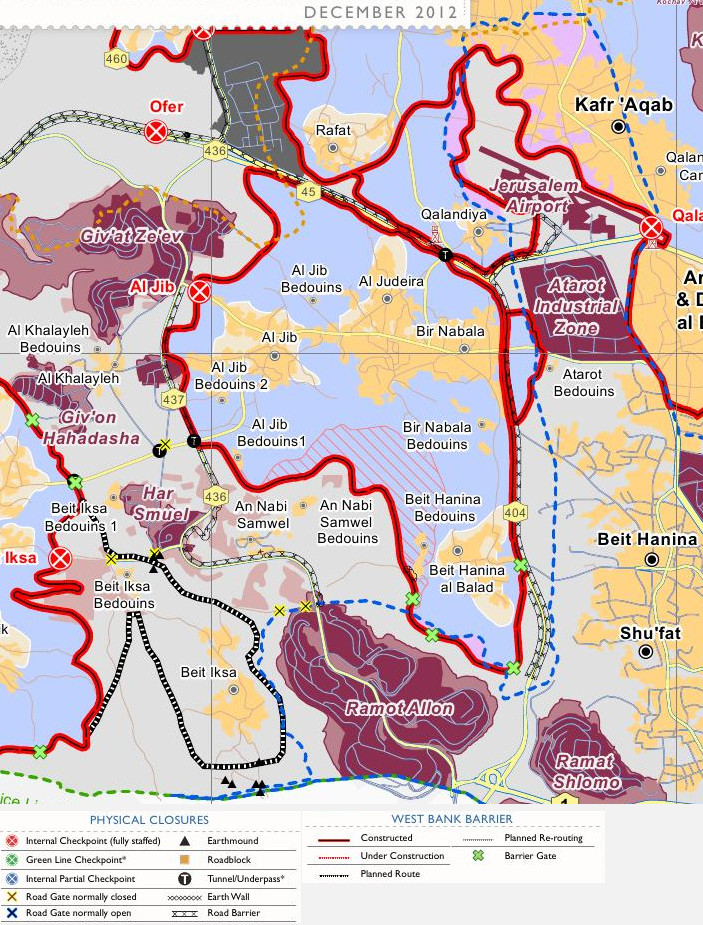
The barrier in northern Jerusalem, which confines Kalandia village (in the north) to an enclave under Israeli control

Qalandia or Qalandiya (Arabic: قلنديا), also known as Kalandia (Hebrew: קלנדיה), is a Palestinian village located in the West Bank, between Jerusalem and Ramallah, just west of the West Bank barrier. The village had a population of 572 residents in 2017. Qalandia is also the name of a refugee camp, established by UNRWA in 1949. It is located just east of Jerusalem municipality. Qalandia refugee camp was built for Palestinian refugees who fled from Lydda, Ramla, and Jerusalem during the 1948 Palestinian expulsion and flight.

== History ==
A large Jewish farmhouse from the late Second Temple period has been discovered in Qalandiya. Occupied from the Hellenistic period until its destruction during the First Jewish–Roman War, the site includes two large structures and rock-cut industrial facilities, including wine and oil presses. The presence of two miq'vaot and typical stone vessels indicates the site's Jewish identity. Excavations yielded two complete amphoras, several amphora fragments, hundreds of coins, potsherds, chalk vessels, metal objects, jewelry, and various tools. Nearby exploration revealed burial caves, winepresses, cisterns, and quarries.

Ancient tombs have been found at Qalandia. A Byzantine bath has been excavated, and pottery from the same period has also been located there.

During the Crusader period, it was noted that Qalandia was one of 21 villages given by King Godfrey as a fief to the canons of the Holy Sepulchre. In 1151 the Abbot leased the use of the vineyards and orchards of Qalandia to a Nemes the Syrian and his brother Anthony and their children. In return the convent was given a part of the yearly production from these fields. In 1152 Queen Melisende exchanged villagers whom she owned for shops and two moneychanger counters in Jerusalem. All the names of the Qalandia villagers were Christian, which indicate that Qalandia was a Christian village at the time.

=== Ottoman era ===
Qalandia, like the rest of Palestine, was incorporated into the Ottoman Empire in 1517. In the Ottoman census of 1596, the village, called Qalandiya, was a part of the nahiya ("subdistrict") of Al-Quds which was under the administration of the liwa ("district") of Al-Quds. The village had a population of 15 households, all Muslim, and paid a fixed tax rate of 33.3% on wheat, barley, olives, beehives and/or goats, in addition to occasional revenues; a total of 3,900 akçe.

In 1838, it was noted as a Muslim village in the Jerusalem District.

In 1863, the French explorer Victor Guérin visited the village, which he described as small hamlet consisting of a few houses with fig plantations around them, while an Ottoman village list of about 1870 showed 16 houses and a population of 50, though the population count included only the men.

In 1883, the PEF's Survey of Western Palestine described the village as a "small village on a swell, surrounded by olives, with quarries to the west."

In 1896 the population of Kalandije was estimated to be about 150 persons.

=== British Mandate era ===
In the 1922 census of Palestine conducted by the British Mandate authorities, Qalandieh (Qalandia) had a population of 144, of which 122 Muslims and 22 Jews. This had decreased in the 1931 census when Qalandiya had an all-Muslim population of 120, in 25 houses.

In the 1945 survey, Qalandia had a population of 190 Muslims, and a land area of 3,940 dunams. 427 dunams were designated for plantations and irrigable land, 2,202 for cereals, while six dunams were built-up.

==== Qalandia airport ====
An airstrip to the east of Qalandia was built by the British army in 1925. It was located a few kilometers north of Jerusalem at a site that offered flat terrain in a largely hilly region. In 1936 it was renovated by the Jewish entrepreneur Pinchas Rutenberg and began to be used commercially on a limited basis by Rutenberg’s airline, Palestine Airways, and the British carrier, Imperial Airways.

Until 1927, it was the only airport in Mandatory Palestine, although there were several military airfields. Qalandia was used for prominent guests bound for Jerusalem. It opened for regular flights in 1936.

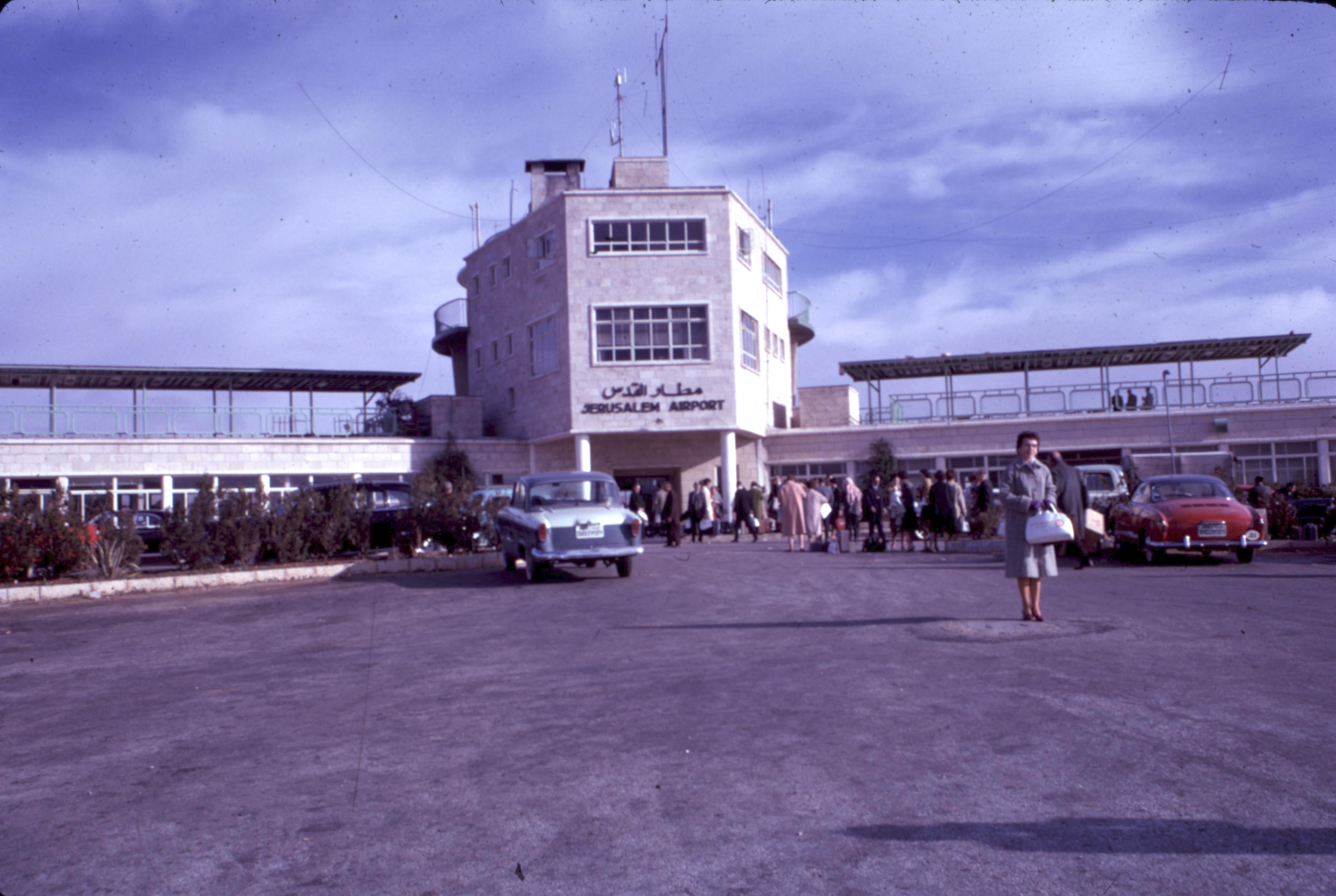
Jerusalem airport, 1961

After the Six-Day War, it was renamed Atarot Airport by Israel, but closed down due to disturbances related to the Israeli–Palestinian conflict, and because international companies refused to land there. Israel confiscated 639 dunums from Qalandia village in order to establish a military base at the former airport.

=== 1947–1949 ===
During the 1947–1948 Civil War in Mandatory Palestine, in early January 1948, the residents of Qalandia evacuated the village and moved to Ramallah, leaving a few young men to protect the property and make sure mines were not planted on the way leading to the village and the nearby mine. The villagers returned to the village, and after the news of the Deir Yassin massacre arrived, the women, the children, and most of the men were evacuated again and the village became a post of the Arab Liberation Army In the wake of the 1948 Arab–Israeli War, and after the 1949 Armistice Agreements, Qalandia came under Jordanian rule. It was annexed by Jordan in 1950.

=== Qalandia refugee camp ===
The Qalandia refugee camp was established in 1949 by the Red Cross on land leased from Jordan. It covers 353 dunums (0.353 km^{2}; 35.3 ha) as of 2006, and has a population of 10,024, with 935 structures divided into 8 blocks. Israeli authorities consider it part of Greater Jerusalem, and it remains under their control.

=== 1967–present ===
Since the Six-Day War in 1967, Qalandia has been under Israeli occupation.

After the 1995 accords, 2% of Qalandiya’s land was classified as Area B, while the remaining 98% is Area C. Israel has confiscated 574 dunams of land from Qalandiya in order to construct the Israeli industrial settlement Atarot, and 639 dunams for the Israeli Qalandiya military base. 1,940 dunums of the village–59.3% of the village’s total area–is isolated behind the Israeli West Bank barrier. In 2006, 1,154 people were living in the village according to the Palestinian Central Bureau of Statistics.

The Qalandia checkpoint is the main checkpoint between the northern West Bank and Jerusalem, and is known for frequent demonstrations against the occupation.

The Israeli 2013 Qalandia raid led to clashes with local residents, leaving three of Qalandia's inhabitants dead and several critically wounded.

== Bibliography ==
- Baramki, D.C. (1933). "A Byzantine Bath at Qalandia". Quarterly of the Department of Antiquities in Palestine. 2: 105–109.
- Barron, J.B., ed. (1923). Palestine: Report and General Abstracts of the Census of 1922. Government of Palestine.
- Conder, C.R.; Kitchener, H.H. (1883). The Survey of Western Palestine: Memoirs of the Topography, Orography, Hydrography, and Archaeology. Vol. 3. London: Committee of the Palestine Exploration Fund.
- Dauphin, C. (1998). La Palestine byzantine, Peuplement et Populations. BAR International Series 726 (in French). Vol. III : Catalogue. Oxford: Archeopress. ISBN 0-860549-05-4.
- Department of Statistics (1945). Village Statistics, April, 1945. Government of Palestine.
- Ellenblum, R. (2003). Frankish Rural Settlement in the Latin Kingdom of Jerusalem. Cambridge University Press. ISBN 9780521521871.
- Gelber, Y. (2004). Independence Versus Nakba. Kinneret Zmora-Bitan Dvir. ISBN 965-517-190-6.
- Guérin, V. (1868). Description Géographique Historique et Archéologique de la Palestine (in French). Vol. 1: Judee, pt. 1. Paris: L'Imprimerie Nationale.
- Guérin, V. (1869). Description Géographique Historique et Archéologique de la Palestine (in French). Vol. 1: Judee, pt. 3. Paris: L'Imprimerie Nationale.
- Hadawi, S. (1970). Village Statistics of 1945: A Classification of Land and Area ownership in Palestine. Palestine Liberation Organization Research Center.
- Hartmann, M. (1883). "Die Ortschaftenliste des Liwa Jerusalem in dem türkischen Staatskalender für Syrien auf das Jahr 1288 der Flucht (1871)". Zeitschrift des Deutschen Palästina-Vereins. 6: 102–149.
- Hütteroth, W.-D.; Abdulfattah, K. (1977). Historical Geography of Palestine, Transjordan and Southern Syria in the Late 16th Century. Erlanger Geographische Arbeiten, Sonderband 5. Erlangen, Germany: Vorstand der Fränkischen Geographischen Gesellschaft. ISBN 3-920405-41-2.
- Mills, E., ed. (1932). Census of Palestine 1931. Population of Villages, Towns and Administrative Areas. Jerusalem: Government of Palestine.
- Palmer, E.H. (1881). The Survey of Western Palestine: Arabic and English Name Lists Collected During the Survey by Lieutenants Conder and Kitchener, R. E. Transliterated and Explained by E.H. Palmer. Committee of the Palestine Exploration Fund.
- Rey, E.G. (1883). Les colonies franques de Syrie aux XIIme et XIIIme siècles (in French). Paris: A. Picard.
- Robinson, E.; Smith, E. (1841). Biblical Researches in Palestine, Mount Sinai and Arabia Petraea: A Journal of Travels in the year 1838. Vol. 2. Boston: Crocker & Brewster.
- Robinson, E.; Smith, E. (1841). Biblical Researches in Palestine, Mount Sinai and Arabia Petraea: A Journal of Travels in the year 1838. Vol. 3. Boston: Crocker & Brewster.
- Röhricht, R. (1893). (RRH) Regesta regni Hierosolymitani (MXCVII-MCCXCI) (in Latin). Berlin: Libraria Academica Wageriana.
- Röhricht, R. (1904). (RRH Ad) Regesta regni Hierosolymitani Additamentum (in Latin). Berlin: Libraria Academica Wageriana.
- de Roziére, E, ed. (1849). Cartulaire de l'église du Saint Sépulchre de Jérusalem: publié d'après les manuscrits du Vatican (in Latin and French). Paris: Imprimerie nationale.
- Schick, C. (1896). "Zur Einwohnerzahl des Bezirks Jerusalem". Zeitschrift des Deutschen Palästina-Vereins. 19: 120–127.
- Socin, A. (1879). "Alphabetisches Verzeichniss von Ortschaften des Paschalik Jerusalem". Zeitschrift des Deutschen Palästina-Vereins. 2: 135–163.
