= Al-Bireh =

City in West Bank, Palestine

Al-Bireh البيرة (Arabic)
- Municipality type A (City)

Arabic transcription(s)
  - Arabic: البيرة
  - Latin: al-Bira (unofficial)
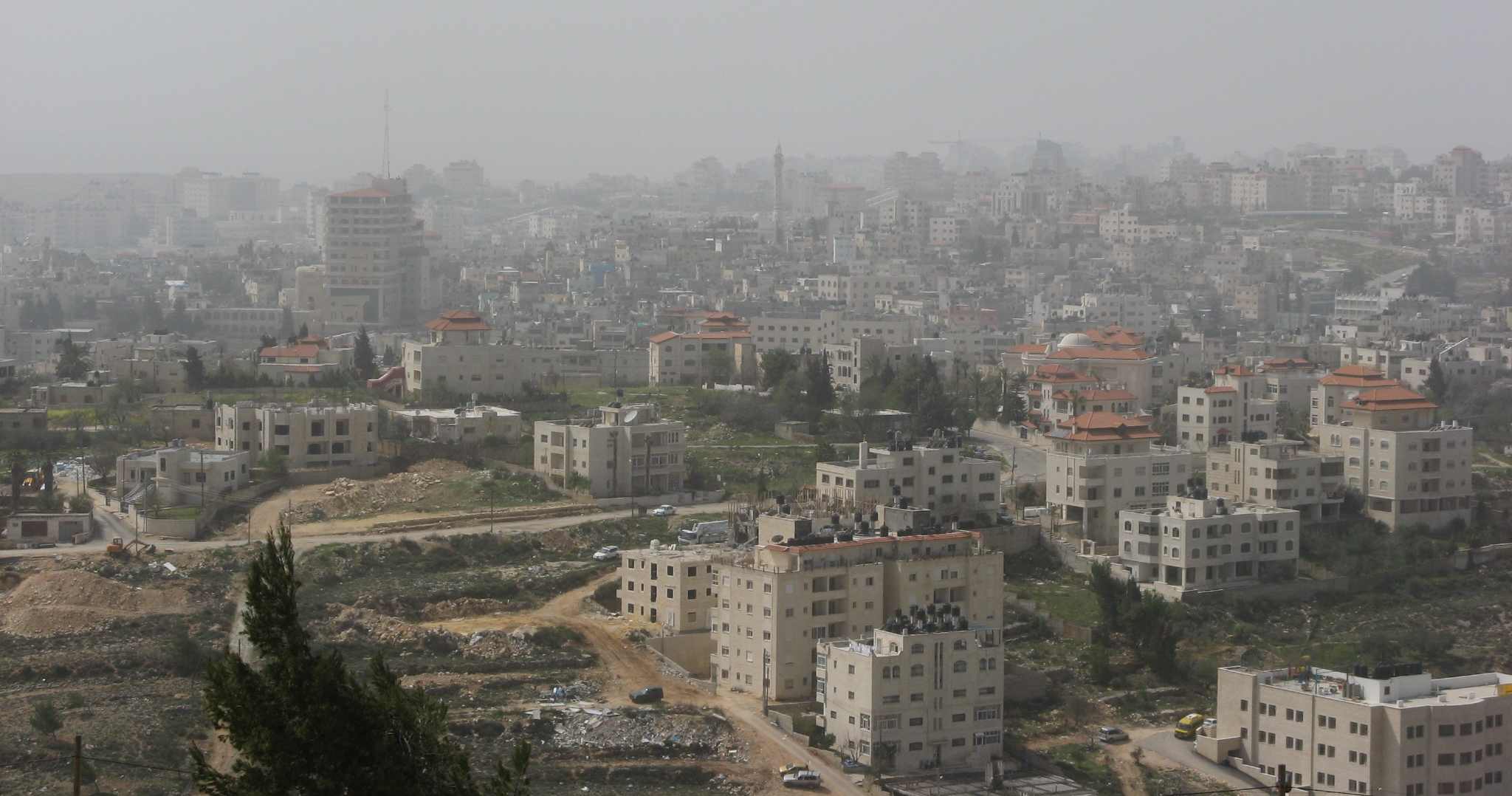

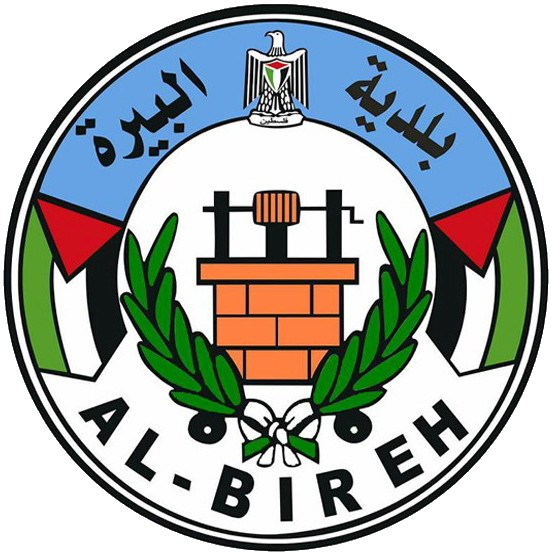
- Municipal Seal of Al-Bireh

- Location of Al-Bireh within Palestine Al-Bireh (the West Bank)
- Coordinates: 31°54′19″N 35°12′54″E
- Palestine grid: 170/145
- State: Palestine
- Governorate: Ramallah and al-Bireh

Government
  - Type: City
  - Head of Municipality: Umar Hammayil

Area
  - Municipality type A (City): 22.4 km^{2} (8.6 sq mi)

Population (2017)
  - Municipality type A (City): 45,975
  - Density: 2,050/km^{2} (5,320/sq mi)
  - Metro: 153,237
- Name meaning: "The Well of the Palace"
- Website: www.al-bireh.ps

Al-Bireh (Arabic: البيرة; alternatively spelled al-Birah or el-Bira) is a city in the central West Bank, 15 kilometers (9.3 mi) north of Jerusalem. It is the capital of the Ramallah and al-Bireh Governorate of the State of Palestine. It is situated on the central ridge running through the West Bank and is 860 meters (2,820 ft) above sea level, covering an area of 22.4 square kilometers (8.6 sq mi). Al-Bireh is under the administration of the Palestinian National Authority (as part of Area A).

Bireh has been associated with several ancient sites. Because of its location Al-Bireh served as an economic crossroad between the north and south, along the caravan route between Jerusalem and Nablus. Under Crusader rule, it was one of the fief villages of the Church of the Holy Sepulchre. It was captured and destroyed by Saladin, but it was rebuilt during the Ayyubid period. Throughout the Ottoman era, it was a predominantly Muslim village. Following the British Mandate, its population grew. After the 1948 Arab–Israeli War, it came under Jordanian rule until the Six-Day War in 1967, when it was occupied by Israel.

Since the Oslo Accords, Bireh has been governed by the Palestinian Authority and now serves as a significant administrative center, hosting various governmental and non-governmental organizations. According to the Palestinian Central Bureau of Statistics (PCBS), the city had a population of approximately 45,975 in the 2017 census.

== History ==
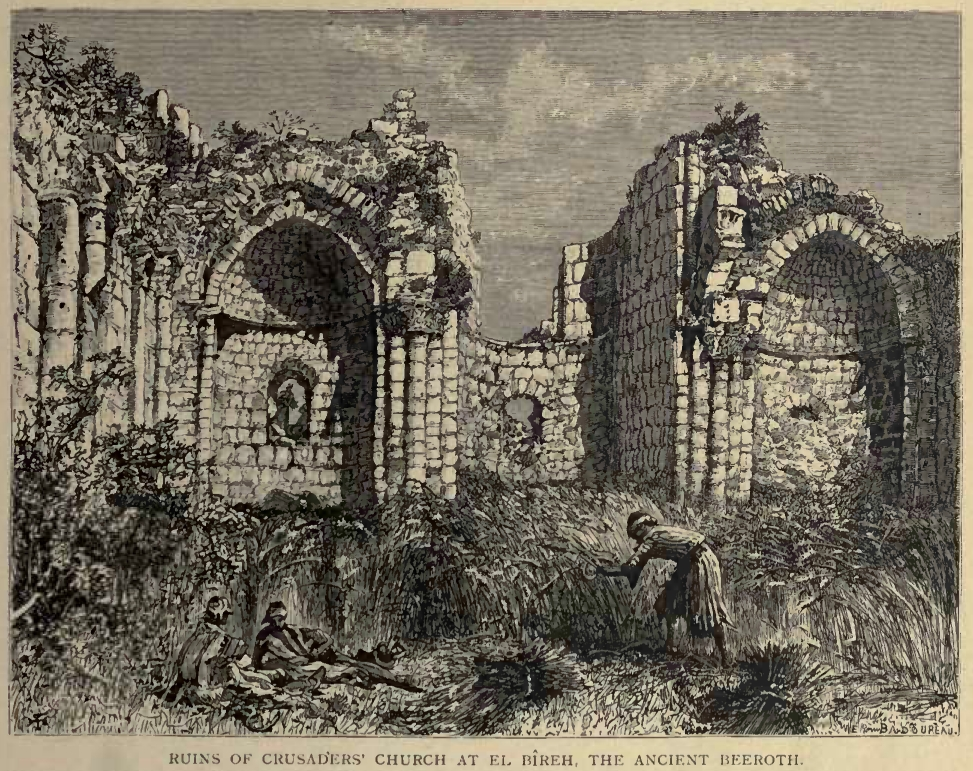
Al-Bireh Crusader Church, circa 1881.

Edward Robinson in the early 19th century thought Al-Bireh was the biblical Be'eroth, but modern scholars believe Be'eroth was located at Kh. el-Burj near Beit Iksa.

In the Hellenistic period, it was also known as Berea or Beroth, and Seleucid general Bacchides camped there in 161 BCE before attacking Judas Maccabaeus's forces at Elasa.

Claude Reignier Conder and others identified it with Beirothah of the Samaritan chronicles.

=== Medieval period ===
The Crusaders captured and named the town Birra. It was also called Castrum Mahomeria, Magna Mahomeria or Mahomeria Major. It was one of 21 villages given by King Godfrey as a fief to the Church of the Holy Sepulchre. In 1114, the gift was re-confirmed by Baldwin I of Jerusalem.

In 1156, 92 people from Mahomeria pledged their allegiance to the Church of the Holy Sepulchre, and a further 50 names were added in the next three decades. Hence, it has been estimated that the total Frankish population at this time was 500–700.

The Crusaders built a castle, church and hospice there. The latter two buildings were built by the Knights Templar in 1146 and belonged to the Church of the Holy Sepulchre.Benjamin of Tudela and Isthori Haparchi described it as a large village.

The Ayyubids under Saladin drove away the Crusaders from Birra when they reconquered interior Palestine after the Battle of Hattin in 1187, and completely demolished the town. Yaqut al-Hamawi mentions seeing the ruins a few times during his travels in the area.

Nearing the end of Ayyubid rule, in 1280, the modern town of al-Bireh was an inhabited village. The Ayyubids built a mosque in the town dedicated to Umar ibn al-Khattab adjacent to the church ruins.

Potsherds from the Crusader/Ayyubid era have been found.

=== Ottoman era ===
Al-Bireh, like the rest of Palestine, was incorporated into the Ottoman Empire in 1517, and in the census of 1596, the village, called Bira al-Kubra, was a part of the nahiya ("subdistrict") of Al-Quds which was under the administration of the liwa ("district") of Al-Quds. It had a population of 45 households, all Muslim, and paid taxes on wheat, barley, olive trees, fruit trees, occasional revenues, beehives and/or goats; a total of 4,570 akçe. Half of the revenue went to a waqf.

The Turkish traveler Evliya Çelebi visited Al-Bireh (Boreth) about 1650. He noted that the revenue of the village belonged to the pious foundations dedicated to the Mosque of Abraham, in Hebron.

In the spring of 1697, Henry Maundrell noted at Al Bireh, which he called Beer, the remains of a church, which he wrote was built by Empress Helena.

After the 1834 Arab revolt in Palestine, the Ottoman authorities conscripted many men from Al-Bireh as soldiers. In 1838, when Robinson visited, 60 had been taken away to be soldiers, out of a total population of 700. Robinson noted it as a Muslim village, el-Bireh, located in the area immediately north of Jerusalem.

When French explorer Victor Guérin visited the village in 1863, he found it to have 800 inhabitants.

Socin, citing an official Ottoman village list compiled around 1870, noted that Al-Bireh had a population of 399 Muslims in 142 houses, and 20 "Greeks" in 5 houses, though that population count included only men. It was further noted that the name meant "The cistern". Hartmann found that Al-Bireh had 142 houses.

In 1883, the PEF's Survey of Western Palestine (SWP) described Bireh as a good-sized village, with "fairly well built" houses.

In 1896, the population of Bireh was estimated to be about 1,080 persons.

Until 1917, the city served as a political and administrative center for the Ottoman Empire.

=== British Mandate era ===
In the 1922 census of Palestine conducted by the British Mandate authorities, Al-Bireh had a population of 1,479; 1,407 Muslims, and 72 Christians, where the Christians were 61 Orthodox, 3 Roman Catholics and 8 "other". The population had increased in the 1931 census to 2,292; 2,044 Muslim and 248 Christians, in 541 houses.

In the 1945 statistics, the town's residents numbered 2,920; of which 280 were Christians and 2,640 Muslims, while urban Bireh had 967 dunams of land, and rural Bireh 22,045 dunams, according to an official land and population survey. Of this, 5,162 dunams were plantations and irrigable land, 11,226 used for cereals, while 759 dunams were built-up (urban) land.

=== Jordanian era ===
In the wake of the 1948 Arab–Israeli War and the 1949 Armistice Agreements, Al-Bireh came under Jordanian rule.

In 1961, the population of Bira was 14,510.

=== Post-1967 era ===
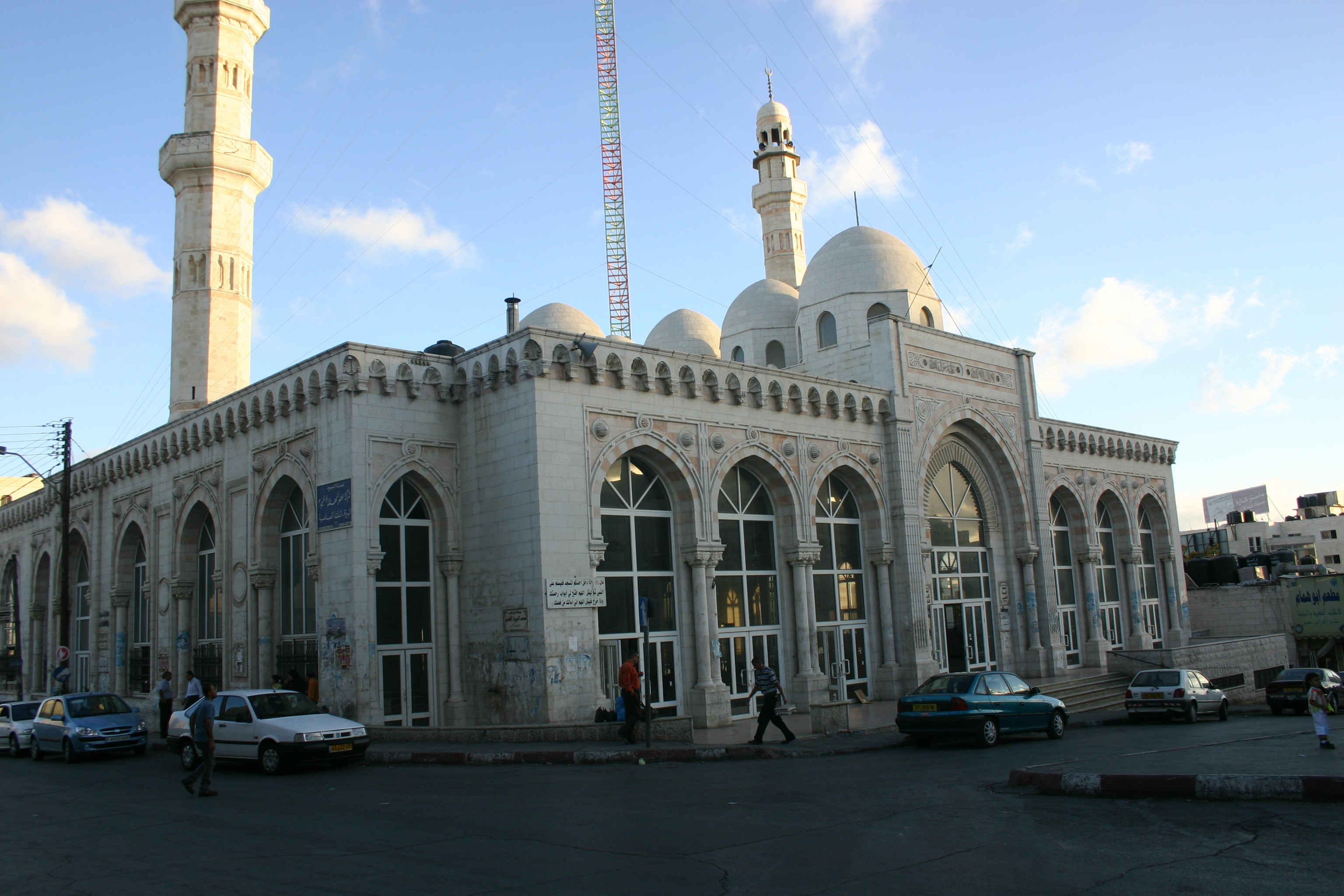
Great Mosque, al-Bireh

During the Six-Day War, on June 6, 1967, Israeli troops occupied the city, and Al-Bireh has been under Israeli occupation since.

Israel confiscated 346 dunams of land from Al-Bireh in order to build the Israeli settlement of Beit El (established in 1977) in addition to 780 dunams in order to build Pesagot (established in 1981).

In 1994, the civil administration of the city was turned over to the Palestinian National Authority under the Oslo Accords. Al-Bireh is the second largest center of Palestinian administration after Gaza. Besides the governor's headquarters, it also hosts a considerable number of governmental, non-governmental, and private organizations, including the Ministries of Transportation, Supply, Information, Public Works and Higher Education, as well as the Palestine Broadcasting Corporation and the Palestinian Central Bureau of Statistics. Due to its proximity with Ramallah, the cities form a single constituency for elections to the Palestinian National Authority.

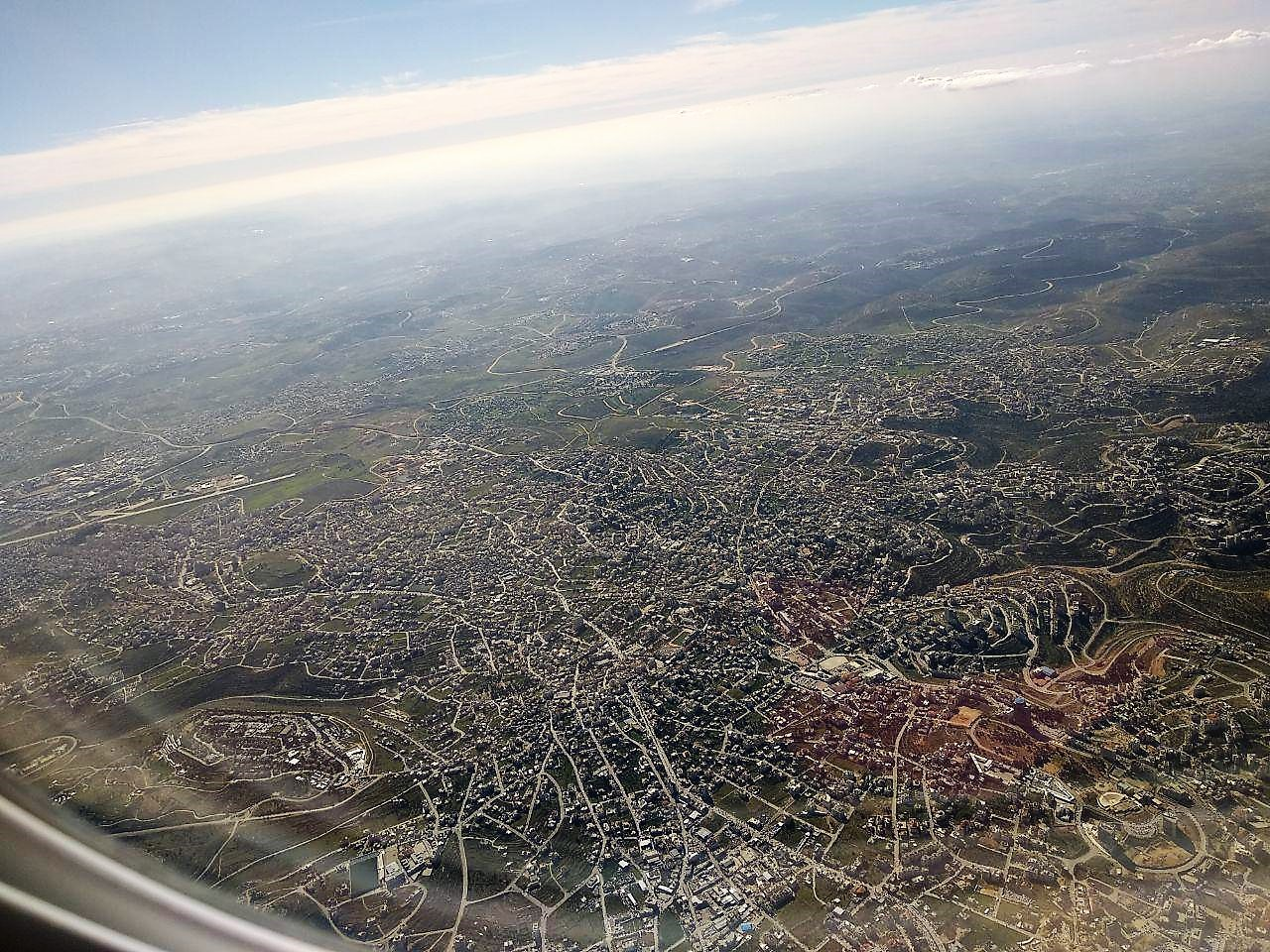
Al-Bireh Aerial photo

After the 1995 accords, 39.8% of village land was classified as Area A, 5% as Area B, while the remaining 55.2% was classified as Area C.

== Demographics ==
The 1997 census carried out by the Palestinian Central Bureau of Statistics counted 27,856 residents, exactly half male and half female. The majority of the inhabitants were Palestinian refugees who made up 55.4% of the total population. In the 2007 PCBS census, there were 38,202 people living in the city.

Al-Bireh is inhabited by five major clans: Qur'an, Hamayel, 'Abed, Qaraqra, At Taweel and Ar Rafidi.

== Government ==
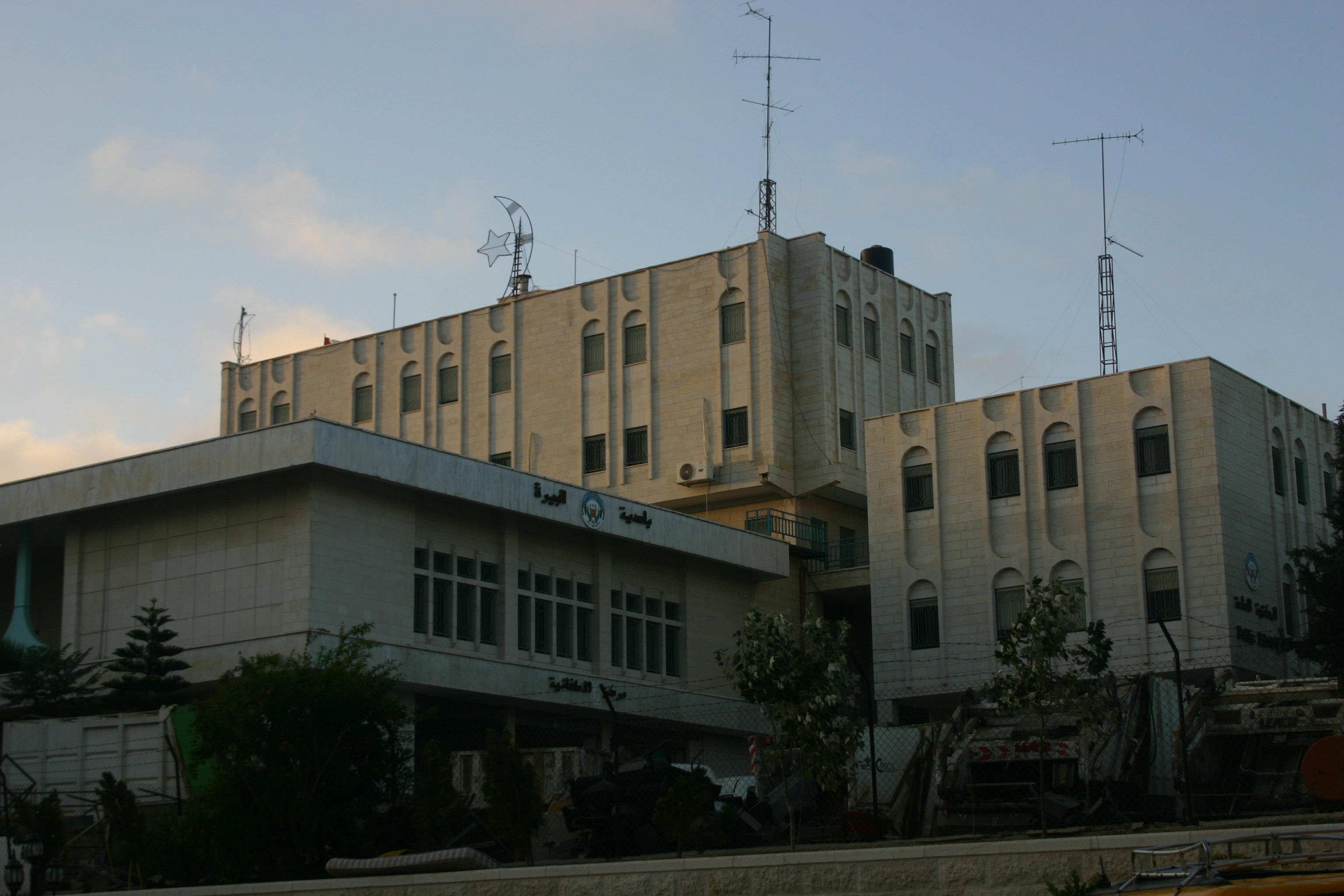
Al-Bireh City Hall

Al-Bireh established a city council headed by mayor Eid Musa in 1928 under the British Mandate. Eight other mayors took office either through elections or government appointments. The city had some well known mayors, including Abudul Jawad Saleh who was mayor in the 1970s until exiled by the Israelis. He later went on to become a member of the PLO executive committee and then minister of agriculture in the Palestinian Authority. In 1982, Israel instated a civil administration, but later appointed an Arab mayor, Hassan al-Tawil. In 1988, after two years in office, he was stabbed and critically wounded outside his office. In 1996, a 12-member municipal council was established by the Palestinian National Authority with Sheikh Jamal al-Tawil as mayor.

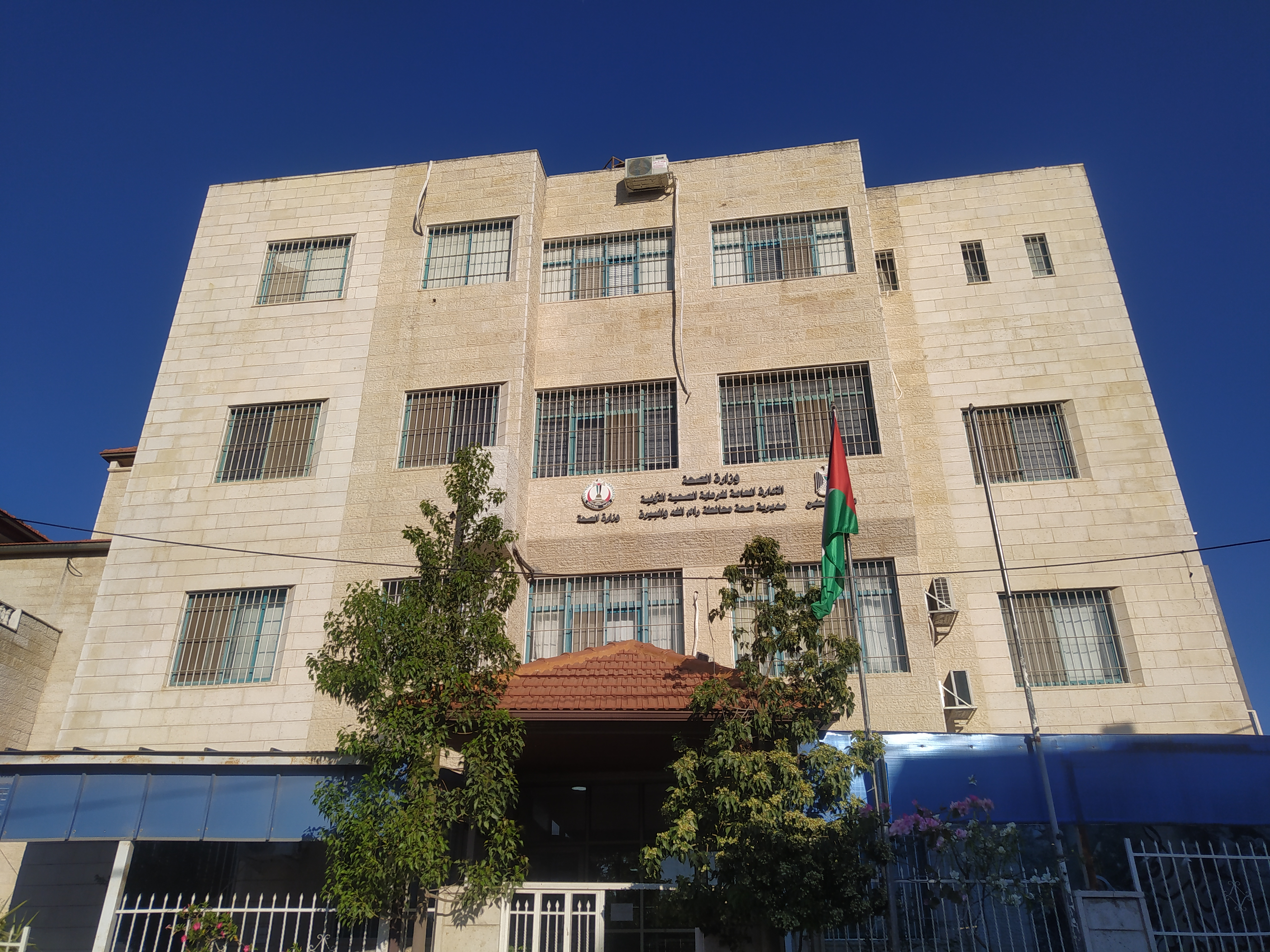
Ramallah and Al-Bireh Governorate Health Directorate

In the Palestinian municipal elections in 2005, the Hamas-backed Reform and Change List won 9 of the 15 seats, while independent lists won the remaining 6. The current mayor is Azzam Esmail.

In 2010, a public square in al-Bireh was dedicated to the memory of Dalal Mughrabi, leader of an attack that killed 38 Israeli civilians, including 13 children, in 1978.

== Health and education ==
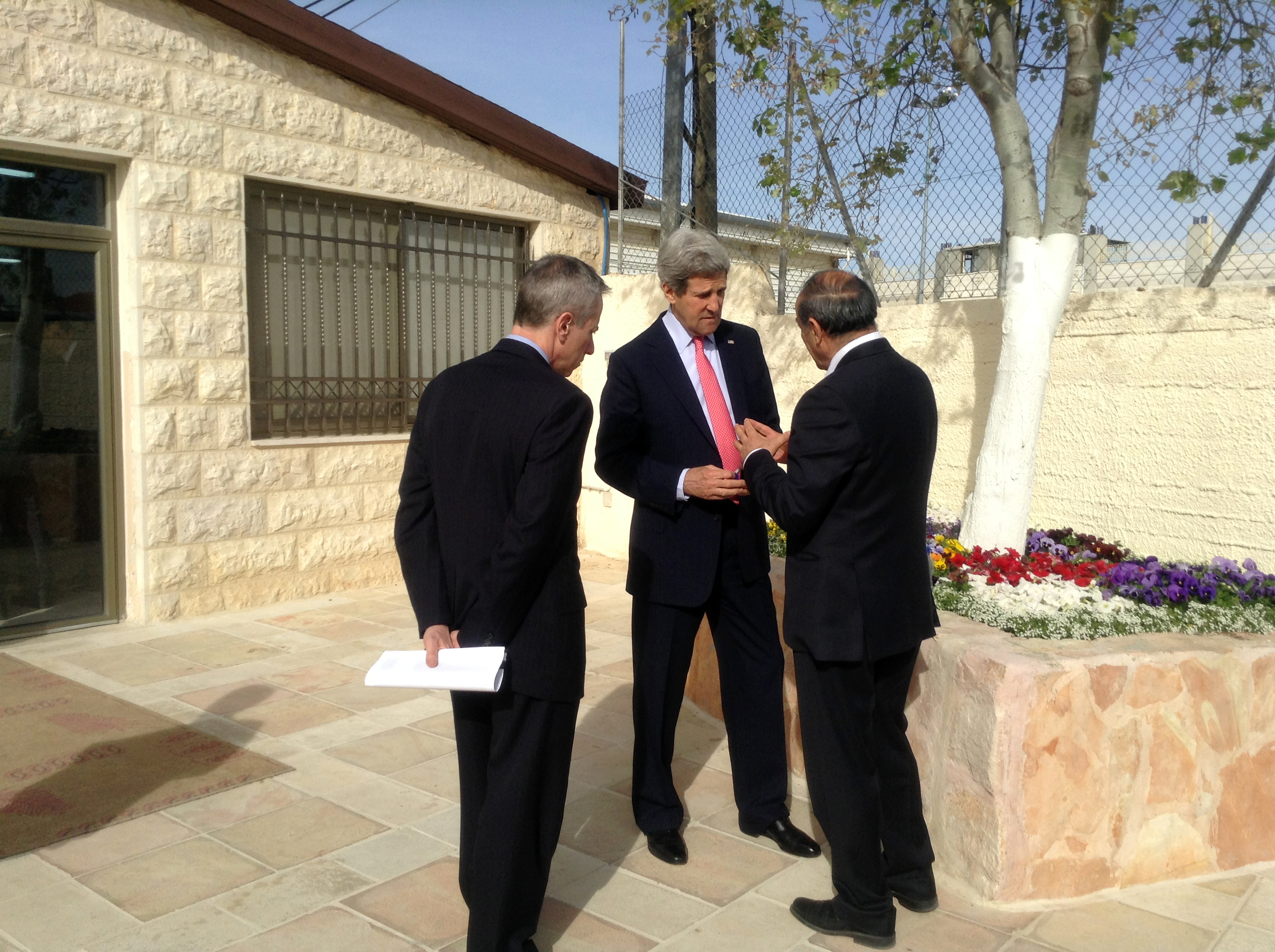
John Kerry visiting Al-Bireh youth center

In 2010, the Jerusalem Fund, National Arab American Medical Association Foundation and Physicians for Peace dedicated the Palestine Diabetes Institute in al-Bireh. Al-Quds University maintains a campus in al-Bireh.

== Sports ==
The 7,000-seat Majed Ass'ad or Al Bireh International Stadium was completed in 2010; originally constructed in 1996, it was upgraded to international standards from 2006 to 2010 at a cost of €3 million. The work was funded by France, the German Development Bank, the UN Development Agency, and FIFA. Construction was halted by the Israeli Supreme Planning Council on November 1, 2009, but resumed in late December. In November 2009, the nearby settlement of Psagot petitioned the High Court of Justice to have the stadium shut down, citing concerns that rowdy soccer fans might attack Psagot.

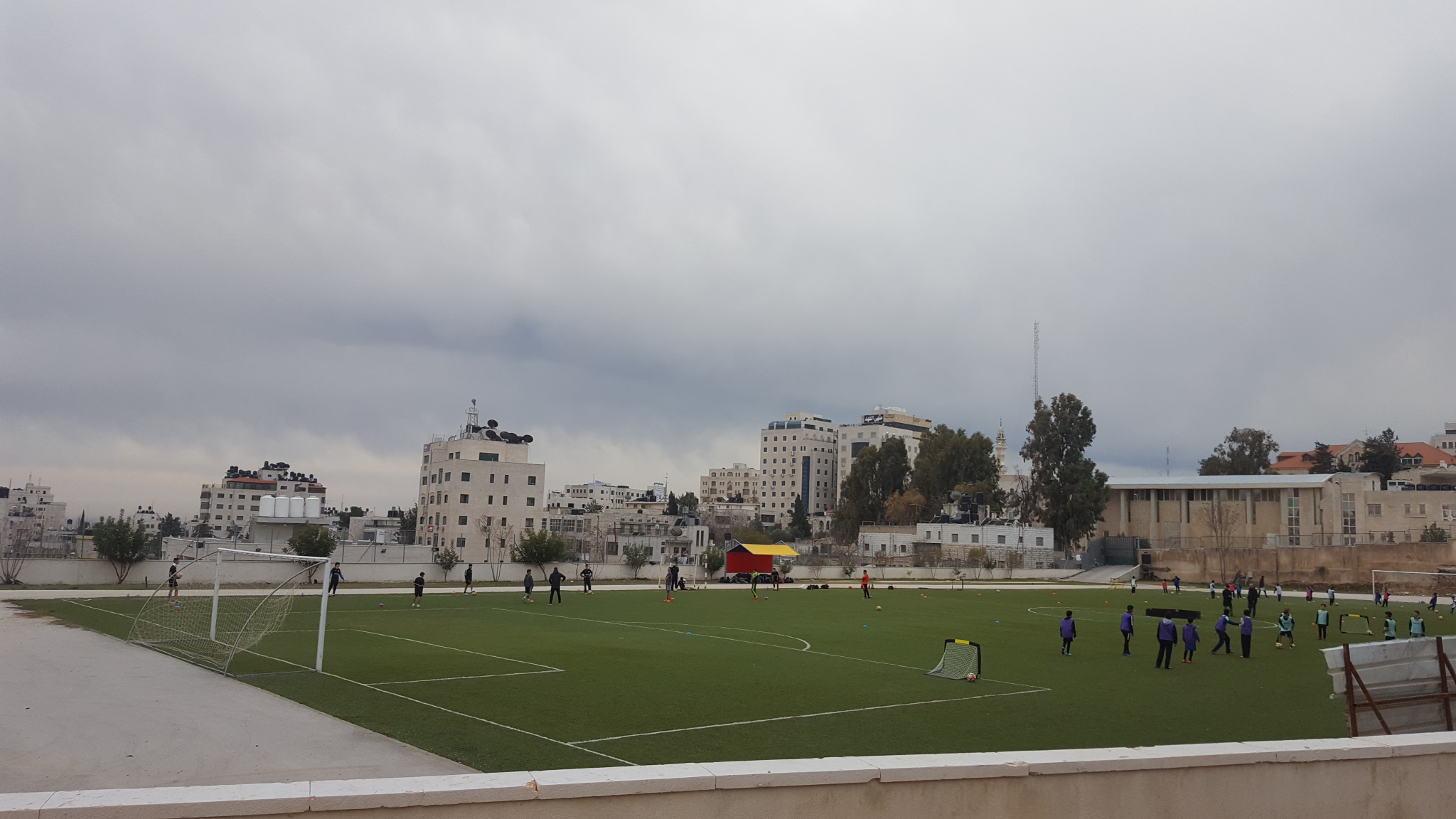
Friends Stadium in Al-Bireh

Al Bireh Youth Foundation is the most prominent sports club in the city, mostly famous for its football teams and ancient scouts association.

== Twin towns – sister cities ==
Al-Bireh is twinned with:

- Gennevilliers, France

== Notable people ==
- Bassel al-Araj, Palestinian activist killed in al-Bireh
- Ahmad Sa'adat, a PFLP secretary-general currently imprisoned in Israel

== Bibliography ==
- Barron, J.B., ed. (1923). Palestine: Report and General Abstracts of the Census of 1922. Government of Palestine.
- Conder, C.R. (1876). "Samarian Topography". Quarterly Statement - Palestine Exploration Fund. 8 (4): 182–197. doi:10.1179/peq.1876.8.4.182.
- Conder, C.R.; Kitchener, H.H. (1883). The Survey of Western Palestine: Memoirs of the Topography, Orography, Hydrography, and Archaeology. Vol. 3. London: Committee of the Palestine Exploration Fund.
- Finkelstein, I.; Lederman, Zvi, eds. (1997). Highlands of many cultures. Tel Aviv: Institute of Archaeology of Tel Aviv University Publications Section. ISBN 978-965-440-007-7.
- Government of Jordan, Department of Statistics (1964). First Census of Population and Housing. Volume I: Final Tables; General Characteristics of the Population (PDF).
- Government of Palestine, Department of Statistics (1945). Village Statistics, April, 1945.
- Guérin, V. (1869). Description Géographique Historique et Archéologique de la Palestine (in French). Vol. 1: Judee, pt. 3. Paris: L'Imprimerie Nationale.
- Guérin, V. (1874). Description Géographique Historique et Archéologique de la Palestine (in French). Vol. 2: Samarie, pt. 1. Paris: L'Imprimerie Nationale. (p. 205)
- Hadawi, S. (1970). Village Statistics of 1945: A Classification of Land and Area ownership in Palestine. Palestine Liberation Organization Research Centre. Archived from the original on 2018-12-08.
- Hartmann, M. (1883). "Die Ortschaftenliste des Liwa Jerusalem in dem türkischen Staatskalender für Syrien auf das Jahr 1288 der Flucht (1871)". Zeitschrift des Deutschen Palästina-Vereins. 6: 102–149.
- Hütteroth, W.-D.; Abdulfattah, K. (1977). Historical Geography of Palestine, Transjordan and Southern Syria in the Late 16th Century. Erlanger Geographische Arbeiten, Sonderband 5. Erlangen, Germany: Vorstand der Fränkischen Geographischen Gesellschaft. ISBN 978-3-920405-41-4.
- Le Strange, G. (1890). Palestine Under the Moslems: A Description of Syria and the Holy Land from A.D. 650 to 1500. Committee of the Palestine Exploration Fund.
- Maundrell, H. (1703). A Journey from Aleppo to Jerusalem: At Easter, A. D. 1697. Oxford: Printed at the Theatre.
- Mills, E., ed. (1932). Census of Palestine 1931. Population of Villages, Towns and Administrative Areas. Jerusalem: Government of Palestine.
- Palmer, E.H. (1881). The Survey of Western Palestine: Arabic and English Name Lists Collected During the Survey by Lieutenants Conder and Kitchener, R. E. Transliterated and Explained by E.H. Palmer. Committee of the Palestine Exploration Fund.
- Pringle, D. (1993). The Churches of the Crusader Kingdom of Jerusalem: Volume I A-K (excluding Acre and Jerusalem). Vol. I. Cambridge University Press. ISBN 0-521-39036-2.
- Pringle, D. (1997). Secular buildings in the Crusader Kingdom of Jerusalem: an archaeological Gazetter. Cambridge University Press. ISBN 0521-46010-7.
- Pringle, D. (2009). The Churches of the Crusader Kingdom of Jerusalem: Volume IV The cities of Acre and Tyre with Addenda and Corrigenda to Volumes I-III. Vol. IV. Cambridge University Press. ISBN 978-0-521-85148-0.
- Robinson, E.; Smith, E. (1841). Biblical Researches in Palestine, Mount Sinai and Arabia Petraea: A Journal of Travels in the year 1838. Vol. 2. Boston: Crocker & Brewster.
- Robinson, E.; Smith, E. (1841). Biblical Researches in Palestine, Mount Sinai and Arabia Petraea: A Journal of Travels in the year 1838. Vol. 3. Boston: Crocker & Brewster.
- Robinson, E.; Smith, E. (1856). Biblical Researches in Palestine and adjacent regions: A Journal of Travels in the years 1838 and 1852, 2nd edition. Vol. 3. London: John Murray. (p. 76)
- Robinson, E.; Smith, E. (1856). Later Biblical Researches in Palestine and adjacent regions: A Journal of Travels in the year 1852. London: John Murray. (pp. 429 + 340(?))
- Röhricht, R. (1893). (RRH) Regesta regni Hierosolymitani (MXCVII-MCCXCI) (in Latin). Berlin: Libraria Academica Wageriana.
- de Roziére, E., ed. (1849). Cartulaire de l'église du Saint Sépulchre de Jérusalem: publié d'après les manuscrits du Vatican (in Latin and French). Paris: Imprimerie nationale.
- Schick, C. (1896). "Zur Einwohnerzahl des Bezirks Jerusalem". Zeitschrift des Deutschen Palästina-Vereins. 19: 120–127.
- Sharon, M. (1999). Corpus Inscriptionum Arabicarum Palaestinae, B-C. Vol. 2. BRILL. ISBN 978-90-04-11083-0.
- Socin, A. (1879). "Alphabetisches Verzeichniss von Ortschaften des Paschalik Jerusalem". Zeitschrift des Deutschen Palästina-Vereins. 2: 135–163.
- Stephan, St. H. (1938). "Evliya Tshelebi's travels in Palestine V". Quarterly of The Department of Antiquities in Palestine. 8 (2). Annotated by L. A. Mayer: 137-156.
- de Vogüé, M. (1860). Les églises de la Terre Sainte. (pp. 338-339)
- Wilson, C.W., ed. (c. 1881). Picturesque Palestine, Sinai and Egypt. Vol. 1. New York: D. Appleton.
