= Nahiyeh (disambiguation) =

A nahiyah or nahiyeh is a regional or local type of administrative division in much of the Arabic-, Persian- and Turkic-speaking realms.

Nahiyeh may also refer to the following villages in Iran:

- Nahiyeh, East Azerbaijan, also known as Nāhīsh
- Nahiyeh, Mazandaran
- Nayeh, also known as Nahiyeh, Qom

== See also ==
- Nahia (disambiguation)
