= ISO 3166-2:PS =

Entry for the State of Palestine in ISO 3166-2

ISO 3166-2:PS is the entry for the State of Palestine in ISO 3166-2, part of the ISO 3166 standard published by the International Organization for Standardization (ISO), which defines codes for the names of the principal subdivisions (e.g., provinces or states) of all countries coded in ISO 3166-1.

ISO 3166-2 codes are defined for each of the 16 governorates of the State of Palestine.

Each code consists of two parts, separated by a hyphen. The first part is PS, the ISO 3166-1 alpha-2 code of the State of Palestine. The second part is three letters.

== Current codes ==
Subdivision names are listed as in the ISO 3166-2 standard published by the ISO 3166 Maintenance Agency (ISO 3166/MA).

ISO 639-1 codes are used to represent subdivision names in the following administrative languages:

- (ar): Arabic
- (en): English

=== Governorates ===
Click on the button in the header to sort each column.

Code	Subdivision name (ar) (BGN/PCGN 1956)	Subdivision name (ar) (Note: For reference only, Arabic name in Arabic script not included in the ISO 3166-2 standard.)	Subdivision name (en)
PS-BTH	Bayt Laḩm	بيت لحم	Bethlehem
PS-DEB	Dayr al Balaḩ	دير البلح	Deir El Balah
PS-GZA	Ghazzah	غزة	Gaza
PS-HBN	Al Khalīl	الخليل	Hebron
PS-JEN	Janīn	جنين	Jenin
PS-JRH	Arīḩā wal Aghwār	أريحا	Jericho and Al Aghwar
PS-JEM	Al Quds	القدس	Jerusalem
PS-KYS	Khān Yūnis	خان يونس	Khan Yunis
PS-NBS	Nāblus	نابلس	Nablus
PS-NGZ	Shamāl Ghazzah	شمال غزة	North Gaza
PS-QQA	Qalqīlyah	قلقيلية	Qalqilya
PS-RFH	Rafaḩ	رفح	Rafah
PS-RBH	Rām Allāh wal Bīrah	رام الله والبيرة	Ramallah
PS-SLT	Salfīt	سلفيت	Salfit
PS-TBS	Ţūbās	طوباس	Tubas
PS-TKM	Ţūlkarm	طولكرم	Tulkarm

== Changes ==
The following changes to the entry have been announced by the ISO 3166/MA since the first publication of ISO 3166-2 in 1998. ISO stopped issuing newsletters in 2013.

Newsletter	Date issued	Description of change in newsletter	Code/Subdivision change
Newsletter I-3	2002-08-20	Insertion of a new entry between PUERTO RICO and PORTUGAL; in accordance with ISO 3166-1 Newsletter V-2	New entry (no codes)
Newsletter II-3	2011-12-13 (corrected 2011-12-15)	Administrative division taken into account.	Subdivisions added: 16 governorates
Online Browsing; Platform (OBP)	2013-02-06	UN notification of full name	
Online Browsing; Platform (OBP)	2015-11-27	Addition of romanization system for ara; change of spelling of category name in ara; change of spelling of PS-QQA, PS-JRH, PS-RBH; update List Source	

== See also ==
- Subdivisions of the State of Palestine
- Neighbouring countries: EG, IL, JO
