= American School of Palestine =

Private school in Ramallah, West Bank, Palestine

Coordinates: 31°55′22″N 35°12′38″E

- (Palestine) Ramallah; Palestine

Information
- Type: Private
- Established: 1995
- President: Tarik M. Ramahi
- Honorary President: L.H. Amra
- Principal: Ruba Muhtadi
- Gender: Co-educational
- Website: Official website

The American School of Palestine (Arabic: مدرسة فلسطین الامیرکیة) is a K-12 bilingual (English and Arabic) school in al-Bireh and Ramallah, West Bank, Palestine.

== History ==
Founded as the Al-Jenan School in 1995, the school originally served mainly Palestinian youth returning to the area from North America. It is now a private school in Al-Balou between al-Bireh and Ramallah. Its high school and middle school students are prepped for the SAT test later being taken in 11th and 12th grade.
