= 2013 raid on Qalandia =

The 2013 raid on Qalandia was an arrest raid by Israeli security forces in the refugee camp of Qalandia, between Ramallah and Jerusalem, that provoked a clash with camp residents protesting the attempted arrest. The fighting left three Palestinian civilians dead and 19 others wounded. Three Israeli security personnel were also injured. According to the Los Angeles Times, the raid was "one most violent clashes in years between Israelis and Palestinians in the West Bank."

== Raid ==
Israeli security forces entered Qalandia on 26 August at 4:30 am to arrest Youssef Khatib. Khatib is a member of Fatah and was recently released from Israeli prison. The Israeli Army described him as a "terror operative". Khatib's brother Hatim claimed that security forces dressed in civilian clothes entered Khatib's house, and that Hatim, and the crowd outside with him, subsequently heard the security personnel fire shots inside Khatib's home. Afterward, people in the crowd began hurling stones at the security forces. The crowd of angry residents swelled to 1,500 and attacked the Israeli forces entering the camp. Israeli troops, sent as reinforcements, shot at the crowds, resulting in the deaths of Rubeen Abed Fares, Yunis Jahjouh and Jihad Aslan, and the wounding of 19 other residents. Fares had reportedly been on his way to work at the local UNRWA office when he was shot. Three Israeli security personnel were also injured by stones. The Israeli Army stated that "an imminent threat" was posed to the lives of their personnel who had "no other alternative but to resort to live fire in self-defence".

== Aftermath ==
The slain Palestinians' funeral was held on the same day of their deaths and the procession in Qalandia was attended by thousands of locals. After the funeral, local youth clashes with Israeli soldiers manning the Qalandia checkpoint. Palestinian official Hanan Ashrawi accused Israel of using "excessive and indiscriminate violence and live ammunition in densely populated civilian areas", describing it as "a blatant violation of international and humanitarian law." The Palestine Liberation Organization (PLO) reportedly cancelled a planned meeting with Israeli officials in Jericho, as part of the ongoing peace negotiations, in protest of the raid.

The Fatah party offices in Jerusalem and Ramallah declared three days of mourning. Palestinian youth in Hebron, angered by the deaths in Qalandia, began clashing with Israeli Army forces in the Old City, resulting in the injury of two youth and the detention of a third.
