= Nahia =

Nahia can refer to:

- Nahia (given name), a Basque female name
- Nahiyah/nahia (Ottoman nahiye/nahiyah), a regional or local type of administrative division in some Arabic- and Turkic-speaking countries
  - Nahias of Jordan

== See also ==
- Nahiyeh (disambiguation), several villages in Iran whose name may be transliterated as Nahiyeh
