= Subdivisions of Jordan =

The subdivisions of Jordan are as follows:

- Governorates of Jordan (muhafazah) – first level
- Nahias of Jordan (nahiyah) – second level
- Kazas of Jordan (kaza) – third level
- Municipalities (amanah), e.g. Greater Amman Municipality
