= Omar Hammayil =

Palestinian politician

- عمر حمايل

Mayor of Al-Bireh
- In office ?–?

Personal details
- Born: 1976/77
- Profession: Chemistry teacher

Omar Hammayil (Arabic: عمر حمايل, ‘Omar Ḥamāyil; born 1976/77) is the mayor of Al-Bireh (in the West Bank) in the State of Palestine. He is also a chemistry teacher.
