= Kaza =

Administrative division historically used in the Ottoman Empire

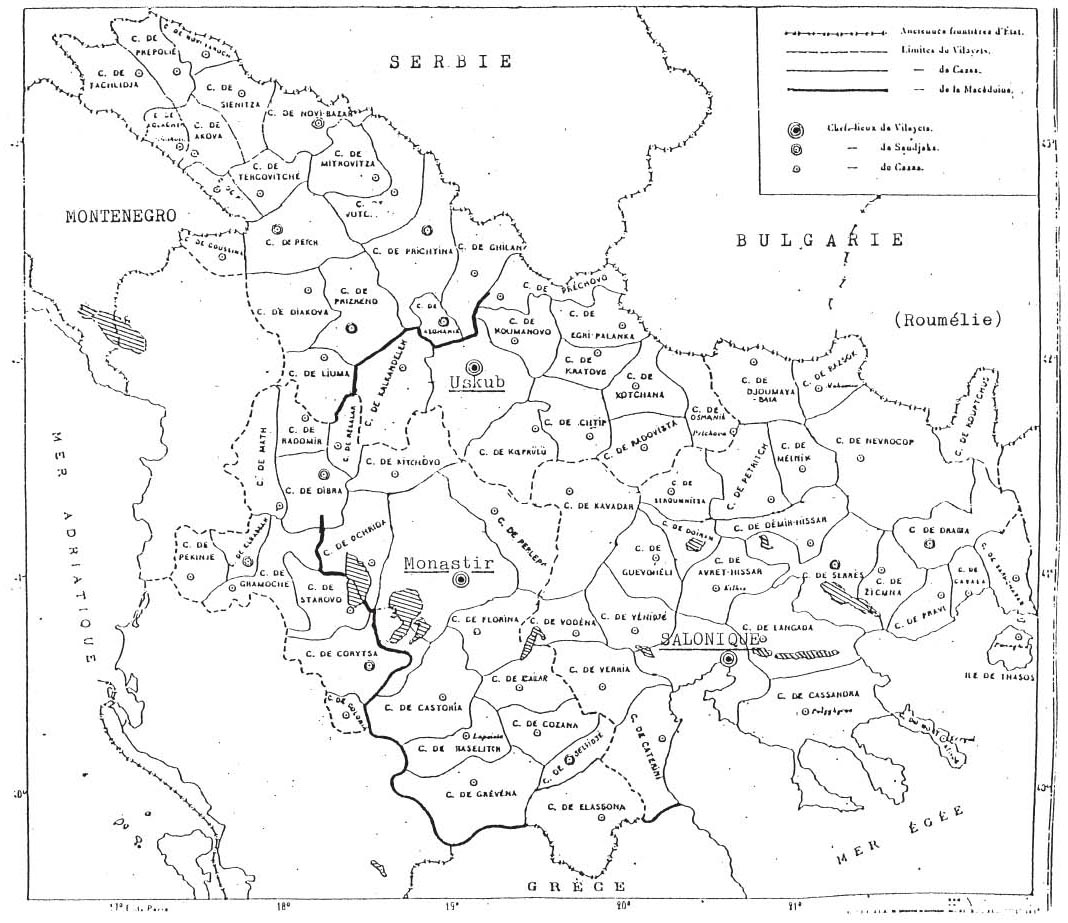
Kazas of Macedonia and Novi Pazar, late Ottoman Empire

A kaza (Ottoman Turkish: قضا, "judgment" or "jurisdiction") (Note: Translations into the languages used by the other ethnicities of the Ottoman Empire, other than those already listed above: Modern Turkish and Ladino: kaza; Armenian: աւան (awan, a calque meaning "borough"); Bulgarian: околия (okoliya, a calque meaning "district") and кааза̀ (kaazà); French: casa; Greek: υποδιοίκησις (ypodioíkisis, a calque meaning "subprefecture"), δήμος (dímos, a calque meaning "people" or "district"), and καζάς (kazás)) was an administrative division of the Ottoman Empire. It is also discussed in English under the names district, subdistrict, and juridical district. Kazas continued to be used by some of the empire's successor states. At present, they are used by Iraq, Lebanon, Jordan, Palestine and in Israel. In these contexts, they are also known by the Arabic name qada, qadā, or qadaa (Arabic: قضاء, qaḍāʾ).

== Former use ==
=== Ottoman Empire ===
In the Ottoman Empire, a kaza was originally equivalent to the kadiluk, the district subject to the legal and administrative jurisdiction of a kadi or judge of Islamic law. This usually corresponded to a major city of the empire with its surrounding villages. A small number of kazas made up each sanjak ("banner") under a sanjakbey. Each kaza was in turn made up of one or more nahiyes ("districts") under müdürs and mütesellims and several karyes ("villages") under muhtars.

With the first round of Tanzimat reforms in 1839, the administrative duties of each district's kadi were transferred to a kaymakam ("governor") appointed by the Ministry of the Interior and a treasurer, restricting the kadis solely to religious and judicial roles. Kazas were further refined and distinguished from the kadiluks under the 1864 Provincial Reform Law, which was implemented over the following decade as part of efforts by the Porte to establish uniform and rational administration across the empire. The 1871 revisions removed the kazas' responsibility for direct supervision of their villages, placing them all under nearby nahiyes instead.

=== Mandatory Palestine ===
The subdistricts of Mandatory Palestine were known as kaza, qada, etc. (قضاء) in Arabic but as nafa (נָפָה) in Hebrew. The same terms continue to be used in present-day Israel and Palestine.

=== Syria ===
Syria used kazas, qadas, etc. as its second-level administrative division after independence but later renamed them mintaqahs.

=== Turkey ===
The Republic of Turkey continued to use kazas until the late 1920s, when it renamed them subprovinces (ilçe).

== Current use ==
Kaza, qada, etc. is also used to refer to the following:

- Districts of Cyprus (first-level, in Turkish)
- Districts of Iraq (second-level, below the governorates)
- Districts of Lebanon (second-level, below the governorates)
- Subdistricts of Israel (second-level, below the districts, in Arabic)
- Subdistricts of Jordan (third-level, below the governorates and the districts)

== See also ==
- Alcalde
- Qadi
