= Nahiyah =

Type of administrative division in West and Central Asia

A nahiyah or nahiya (Arabic: نَاحِيَة, romanized: nāḥiya [ˈnaːħija], plural نَوَاحِي, nawāḥī [naˈwaːħiː]), also spelled nahia, nahiyeh or nahiye, is a regional or local type of administrative division that usually consists of a number of villages or sometimes smaller towns. The Ottoman nahiye, also called a bucak, was a third-level or lower administrative division, and remains as such in some successor states such as Syria, Iraq, Lebanon and Jordan, with the Balkan states of Serbia and Montenegro having preserved the term for a while after liberation for the highest administrative unit as nahija. In Tajikistan and the autonomous Chinese region of Xinjiang, both from the Turco-Persian or Turkic regions of Asia, it is a second- and third-level division, respectively. A nahiyah can constitute a division of a qada', mintaqa or other such district-type division and is sometimes translated as "subdistrict".

== Ottoman Empire ==
The nahiye (Ottoman Turkish: ناحیه) was an administrative territorial entity of the Ottoman Empire, smaller than a kaza. The head was a mütesellim (governor) who was appointed by the Pasha.

The kaza was a subdivision of a sanjak and corresponded roughly to a city with its surrounding villages. Kazas, in turn, were divided into nahiyes (each governed by a müdür) and villages (karye, each governed by a muhtar). Revisions of 1871 to the administrative law established the nahiye (still governed by a müdür) as an intermediate level between the kaza and the village.

=== Successor states in the Balkans ===
After achieving national liberation, the Principality of Serbia (1817–1833) and Principality of Montenegro (1852–1910) preserved the term as nahija (Serbian Cyrillic: нахија).

== Examples ==
=== Arabic-speaking countries ===
Country	Level above (Arabic)	Level above (English)	Main article
Syria	Mintaqa (formerly qadaa)	district	
Palestine	Liwa'	governorates	Districts of Palestine
Iraq	Qada'	district	Subdistricts of Iraq
Lebanon			
Jordan	Liwa'	governorate	Nahias of Jordan

=== Turkic-speaking territories ===
- Xinjiang, China: a subdivision of a prefectural.
- Ottoman Empire: subdistrict, commune, parish; a subdivision of a kaza (قضاء).

=== Other ===
- Districts of Tajikistan: a subdivision of a province.
- Nahiye (Ottoman)#Successor states in the Balkans

== Persian language ==
Persian has borrowed the Arabic word with the spelling ناحیه. Encyclopædia Iranica transliterates it mostly as nahia or, with diacritics, nāḥia/nāḥīa. In modern contexts it may be used with the meaning of anything between 'census region', and 'section' as in "Section (nāḥia) 2 of eleven local fishing stations".

== See also ==
- Nahia (disambiguation page)
