= Jerusalem International Airport =

Unused British-era airport in Jerusalem

Jerusalem International Airport נְמַל הַתְּעוּפָה יְרוּשָׁלַיִם مطار القدس الدولي
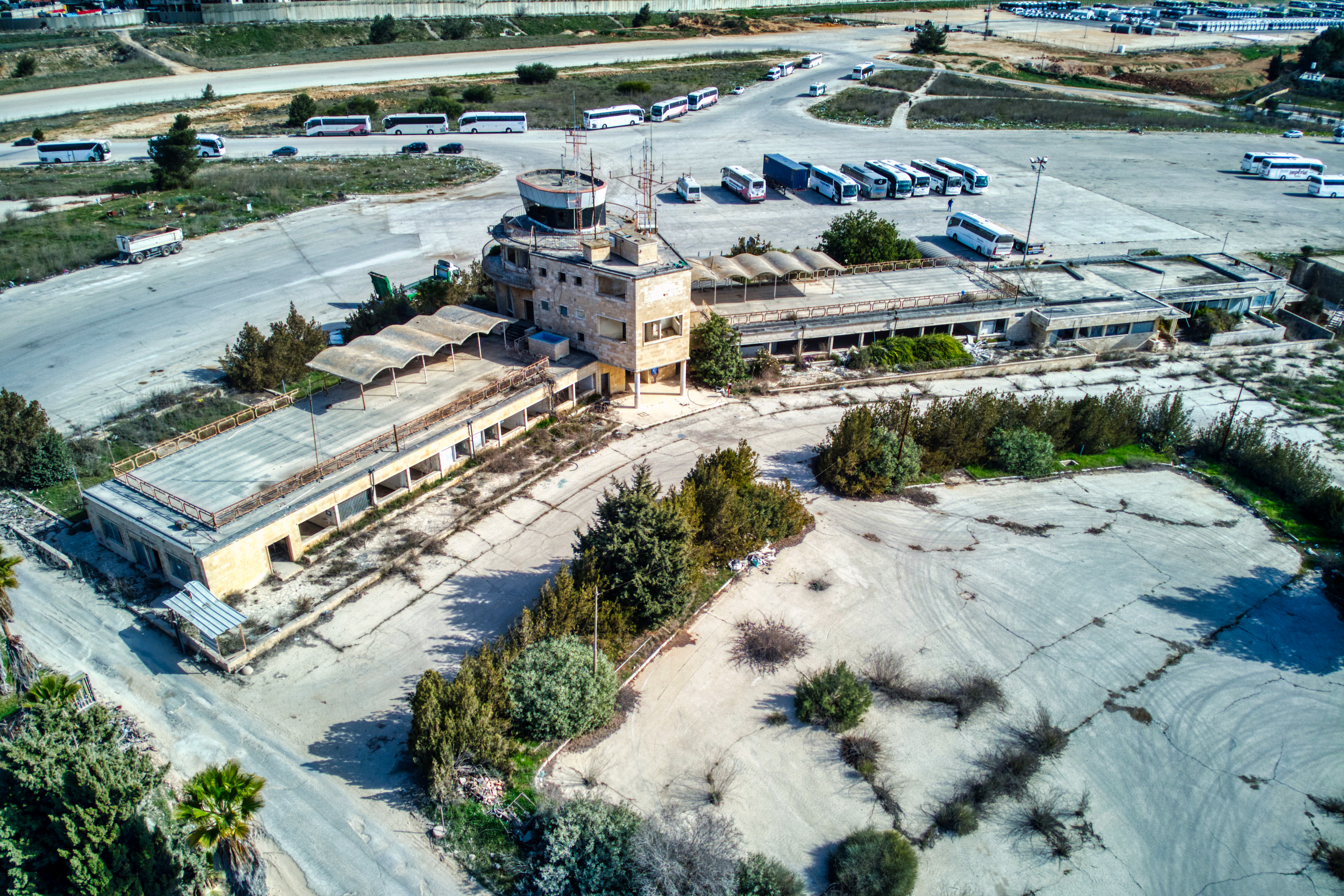
- IATA: JRS; ICAO: LLJR, OJJR

Summary
- Airport type: Defunct (formerly military and public)
- Operator: Israel Defense Forces; Israel Airports Authority
- Location: East Jerusalem
- Opened: May 1924
- Closed: 8 October 2000
- Elevation AMSL: 2,485 ft (757 m)
- Coordinates: 31°51′53″N 35°13′09″E

Map
- Location within Jerusalem Location within the West Bank

Runways
Direction	Length		Surface
Direction	ft	m	Surface
12/30	6,447	1,965	Asphalt

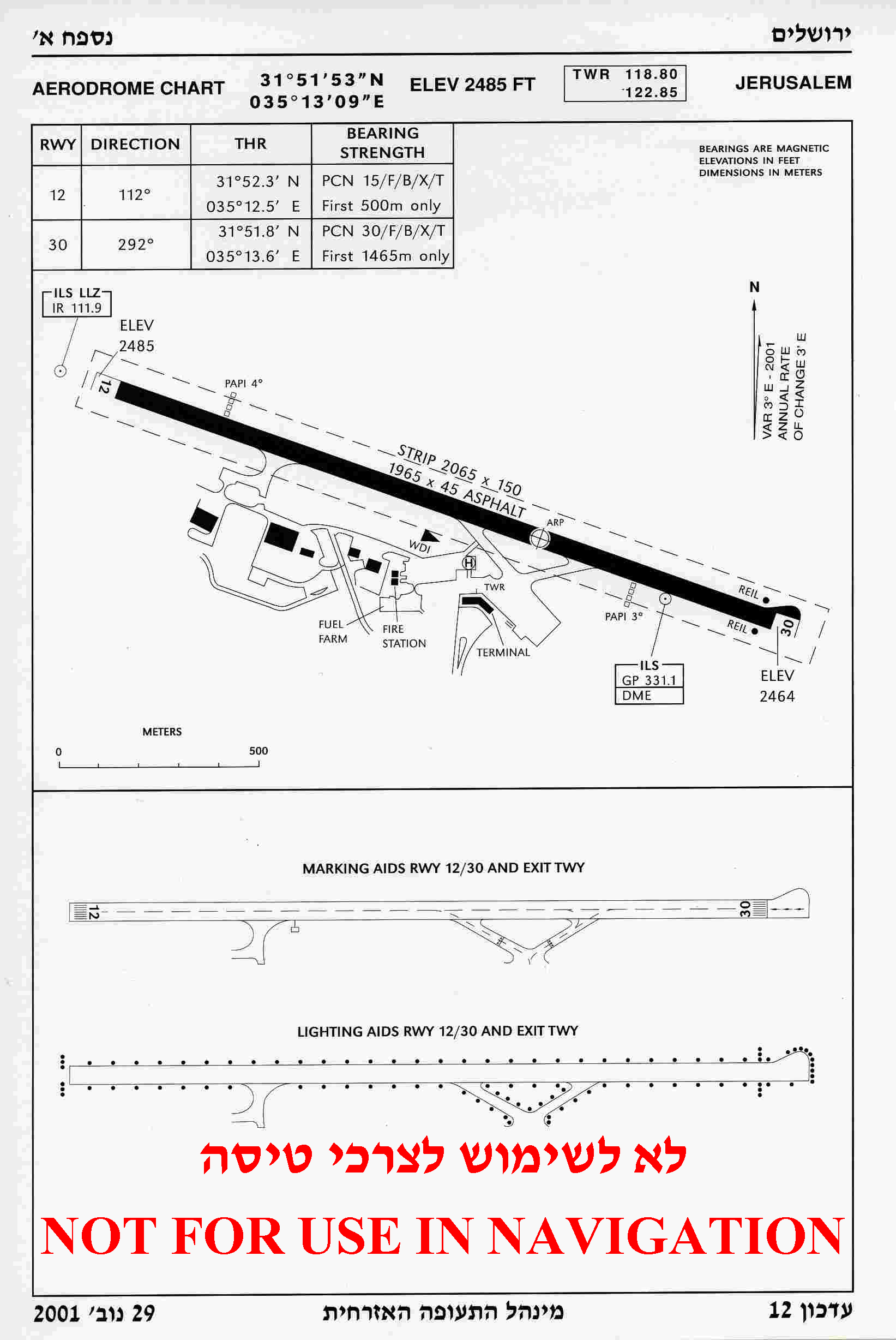
Atarot Airport chart

Jerusalem International Airport (Note: Hebrew: נמל התעופה ירושלים; Arabic: مطار القدس الدولي; also known as Kalandia/Qalandia Airport or Atarot Airport.) (IATA: JRS, ICAO: LLJR, OJJR) was a regional airport located in the city of Jerusalem. When it was opened in 1925, it was the first airport in the British Mandate for Palestine.

Under the British Mandate, the former Cyprus Airways flew to the airport, and this continued intermittently after Cyprus gained independence from the United Kingdom in 1960. Following the 1948 Arab–Israeli War, the airport was occupied by Jordan alongside the rest of the West Bank, and in 1950, it became part of the Jordanian annexation of the West Bank. Between 1948 and 1967, Royal Jordanian Airlines, as well as Middle East Airlines from Lebanon, operated daily commercial flights to and from the airport.

In 1967, Israel won the Six-Day War and began militarily occupying all previously Jordanian-annexed territory, including the airport. In 1981, Israel effectively annexed the airport as part of the Jerusalem Law. Between 1967 and 2000, Arkia and El Al operated daily commercial flights to and from the airport. Israel closed the airport to all civilian traffic following the outbreak of the Second Intifada in 2000.

== History ==
Until 1927, the airfield in Kalandia was the only airport in the British Mandate for Palestine. It was used by the British military authorities and prominent guests bound for Jerusalem. In 1931, the Mandatory government expropriated land from the Jewish village of Atarot to expand the airfield, in the process demolishing homes and uprooting fruit orchards. In 1936, the airport was opened for regular flights. The village of Atarot was captured and destroyed by the Jordanian Arab Legion during the 1948 Arab–Israeli War.

From 1948 to the Six-Day War in June 1967, the airport was under Jordanian control, designated OJJR. Following the Six Day War, the Jerusalem airport was incorporated into the Jerusalem city municipal area and was designated LLJR.

In the 1970s and early 1980s, Israel invested considerable resources in upgrading the airport and creating the infrastructure for a full-fledged international airport but the international aviation authorities, bearing in mind that the airport was in lands captured in 1967 by Israel, would not allow international flights to land there. Thus the airport was only used for domestic flights and charter flights.

Due to security issues during the Second Intifada, the airport was closed to civilian air traffic in October 2000 and by July 2001 it was formally handed over to the Israel Defense Forces.

In maps presented by Israel at the 2000 Camp David Summit, Atarot was included in the Israeli built-up area of Jerusalem. This was rejected by the Palestinian delegation, which envisioned it as a national airport for the Palestinians. Yossi Beilin proposed that the airport be used jointly as part of an overall sharing of Jerusalem between Israel and the Palestinian Authority, citing the successful model of the Geneva Airport, which is used by both Switzerland and France.

== Israeli settlement planning ==
A planning committee was scheduled to discuss on 6 December 2021, a proposal for 9,000 housing units. The site is between the Beit Hanina and Kafr Aqab, the "last free space for development left for Palestinians in the Jerusalem area."

However, on 25 November 2021, under pressure from the Biden administration in the United States, Israel has shelved plans to redevelop Jerusalem airport site.

== Gallery ==
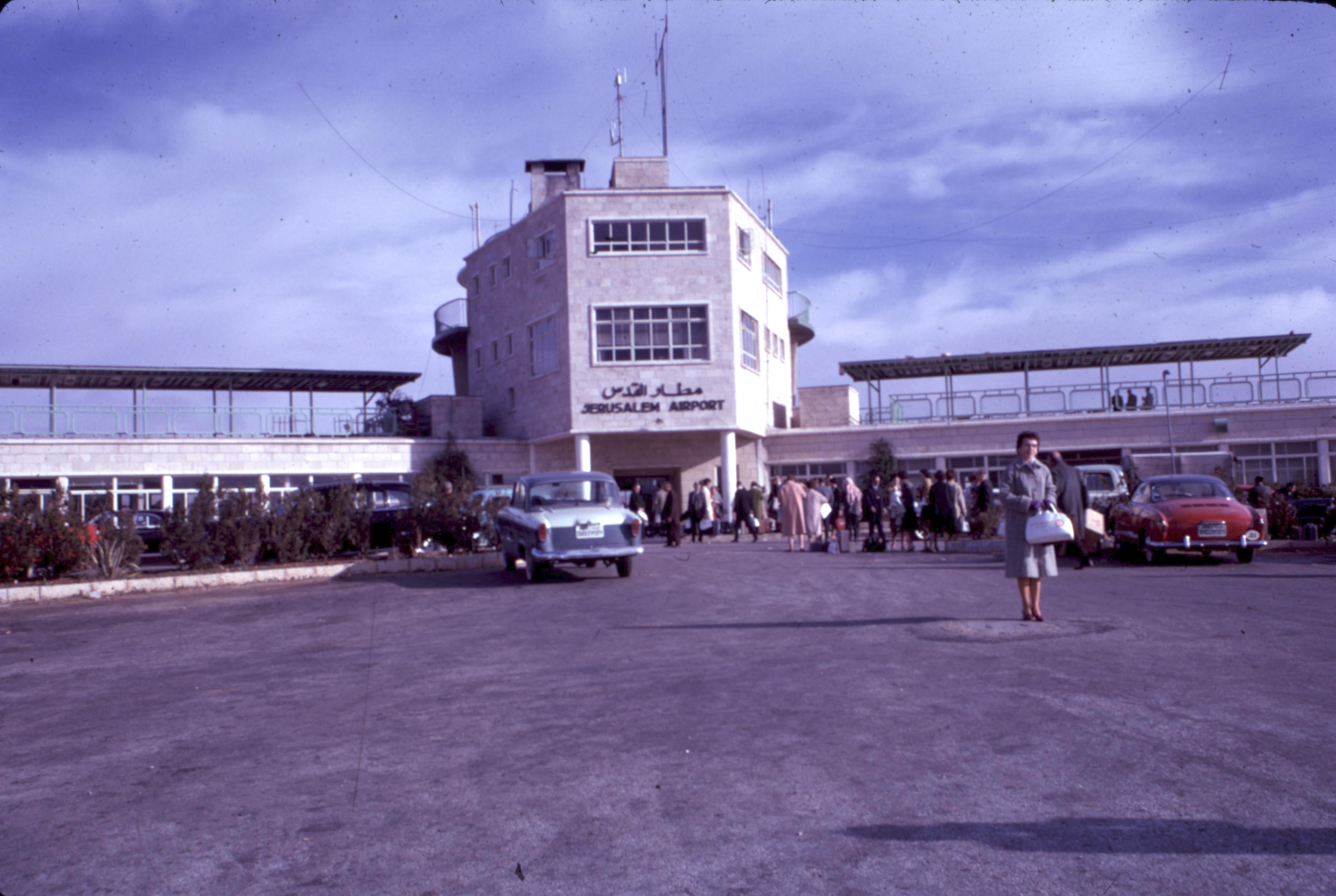
Atarot Airport/Jerusalem in 1961

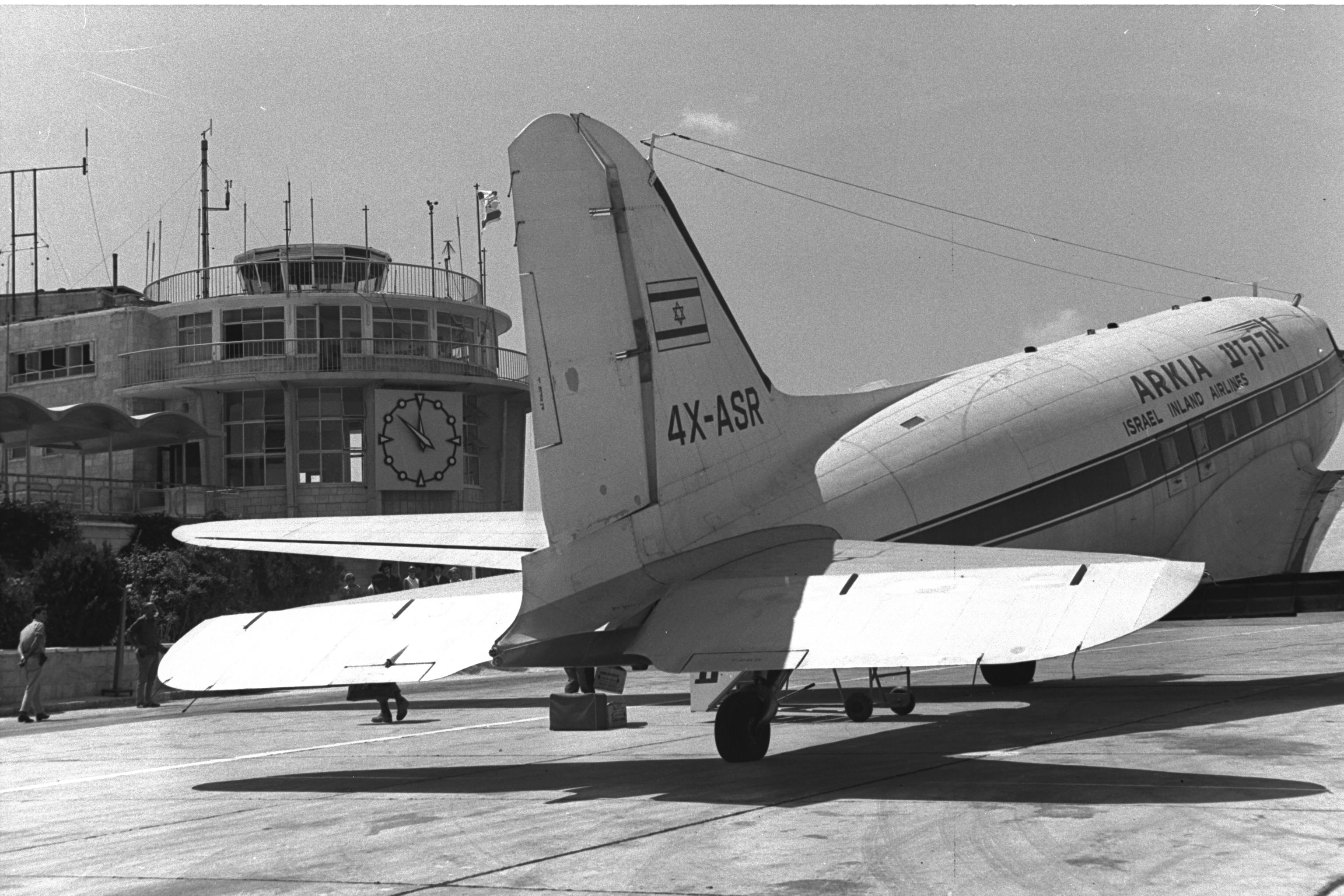
An Arkia Airlines aircraft at Atarot Airport in 1968

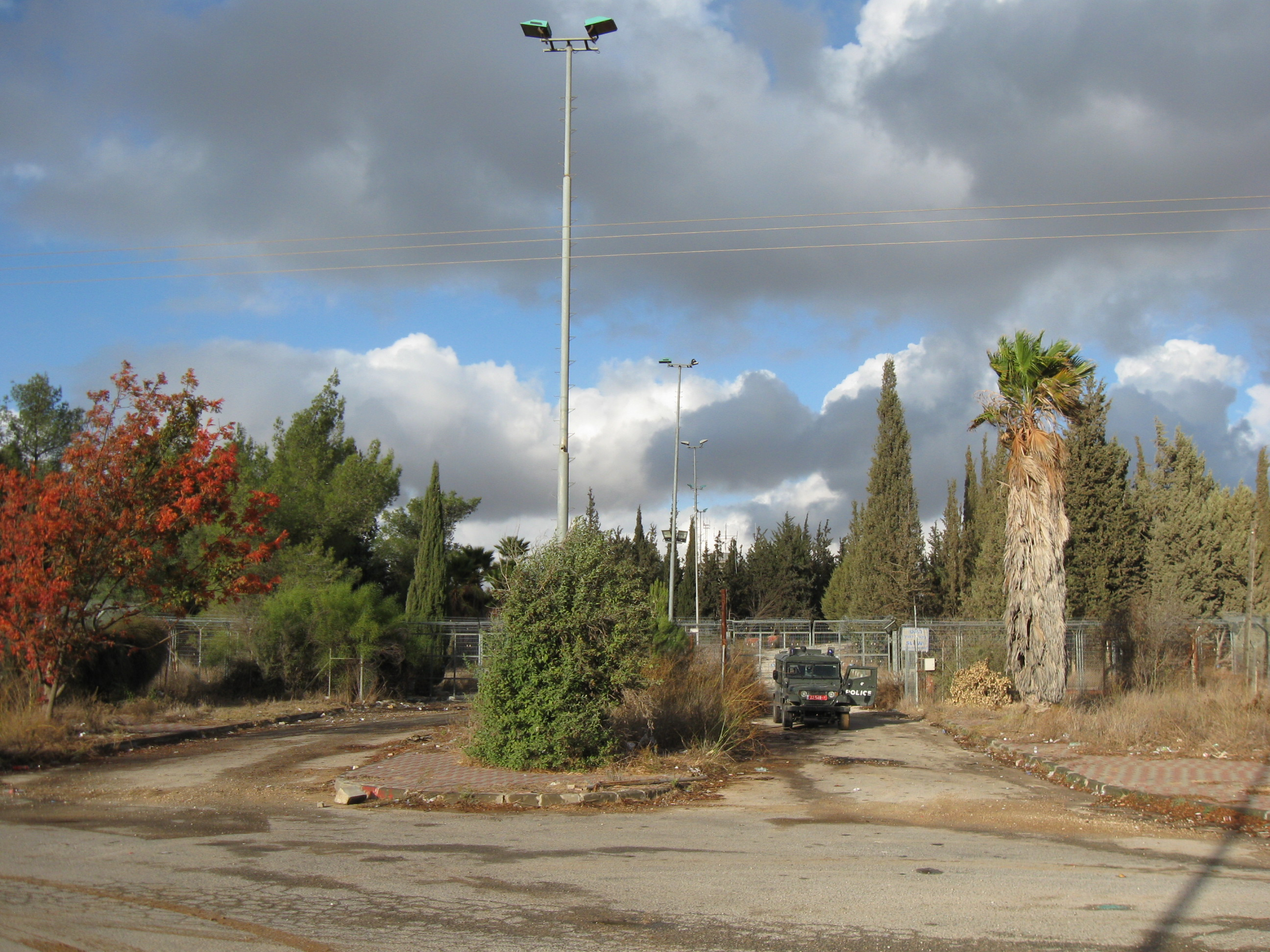
The closed entrance to Atarot Airport in 2010, with a police jeep guarding

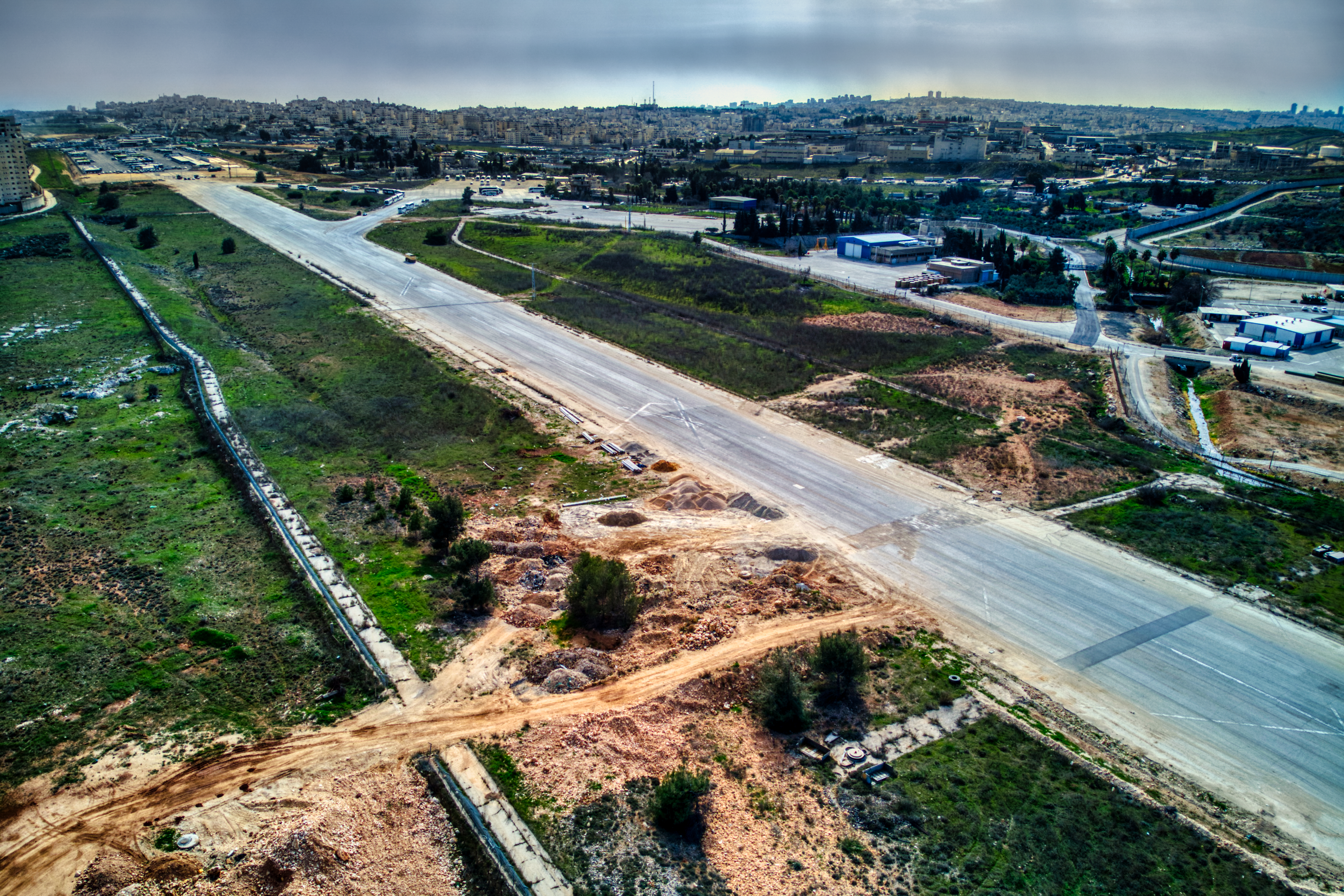
Jerusalem International Airport runway, 2023

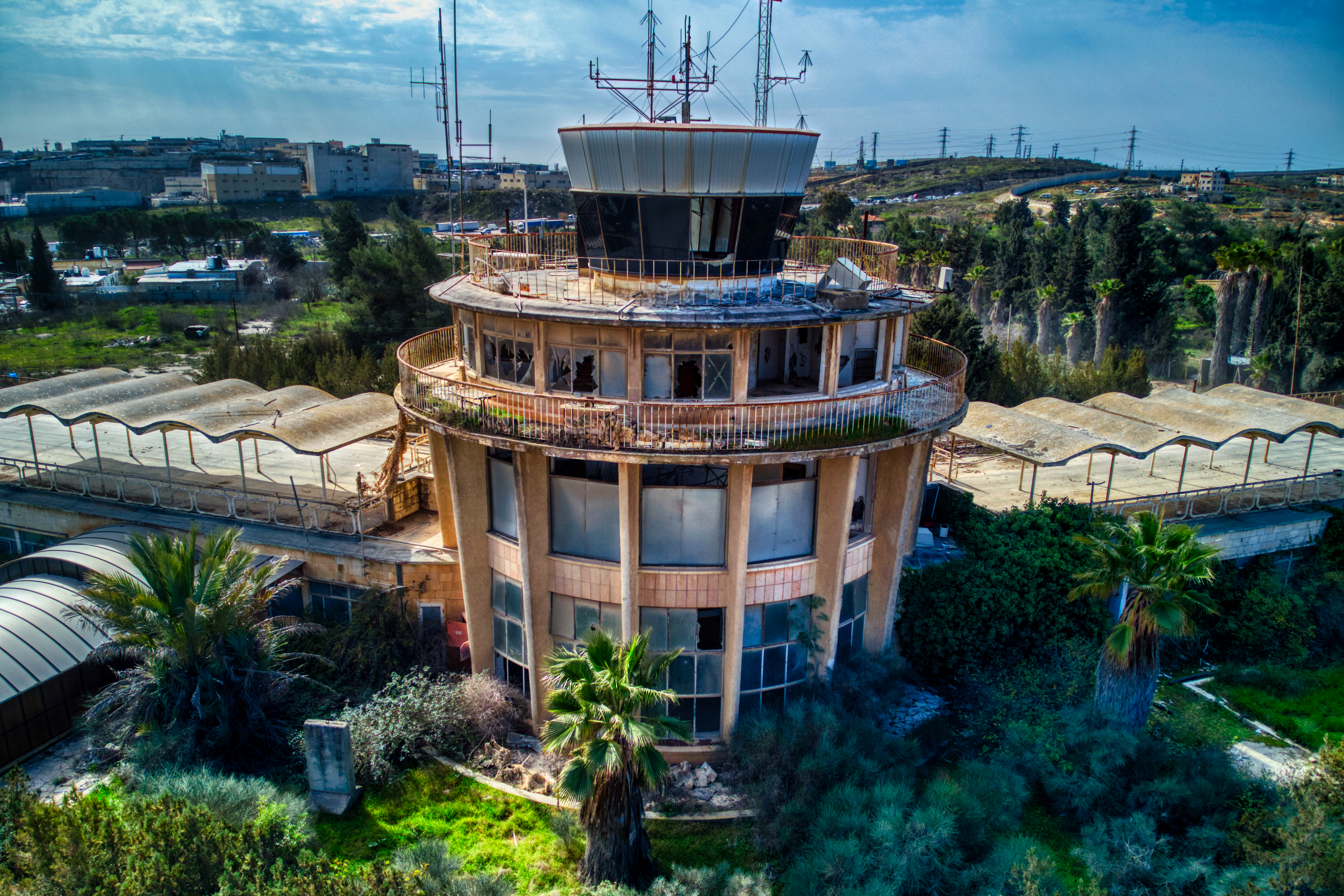
Jerusalem International Airport tower, 2023

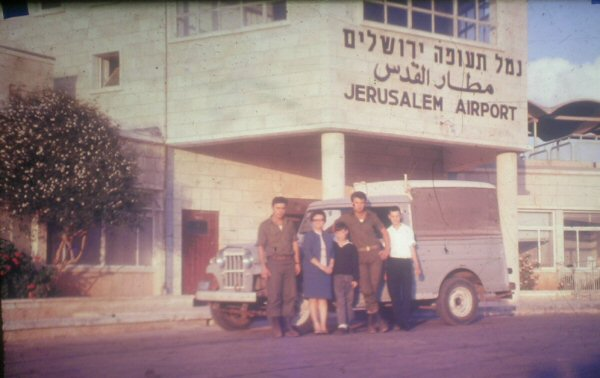
Atarot Airport, 1969

== ICAO codes ==
The airport is sometimes shown with two different ICAO codes. The LL designator is used by ICAO for airports in Israel and OJ is the code for Jordan.

== In popular culture ==
All the control tower scenes and the Algiers Airport terminal sequences of the Chuck Norris film The Delta Force were filmed at Atarot Airport, with the terminal dressed in Arabic and French signs along with the addition of Algerian flags to act as Houari Boumedienne Airport.

The airport is depicted in the film World War Z as the main Israeli airport defended from a zombie epidemic; all of the film's Israel sequences were shot in Malta.

== See also ==
- Ben-Gurion International Airport
