= Electoral regions in Palestine =

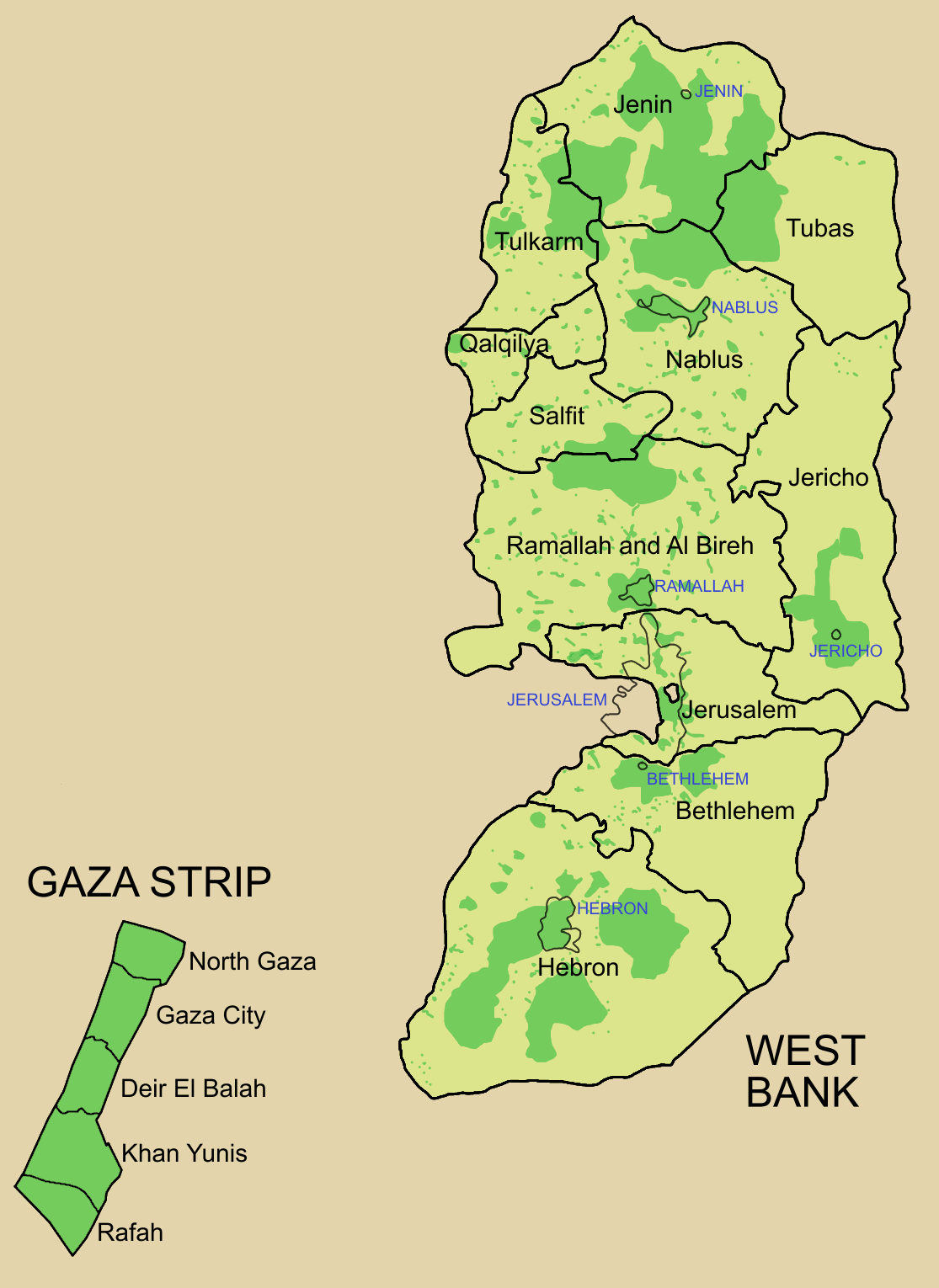
Map of the 2006 electoral regions

The 16 Governorates of the Palestinian National Authority are divided into 16 electoral regions (Aqdya, singular – qadaa). The capitals of districts are given in parentheses.

Jerusalem Governorate:

- Jerusalem District (Jerusalem)

Bethlehem Governorate:

- Bethlehem District (Bethlehem)

Deir Al-Balah Governorate:

- Deir Al-Balah District (Deir Al-Balah)

Gaza Governorate:

- Gaza District (Gaza City)

Hebron Governorate:

- Hebron District (Hebron)

Jenin Governorate:

- Jenin District (Jenin)

Jericho Governorate:

- Jericho District (Jericho)

Khan Yunis Governorate:

- Khan Younis District (Khan Younis)

Nablus Governorate:

- Nablus District (Nablus)

North Gaza Governorate:

- North Gaza (Jabalya)

Qalqilya Governorate:

- Qalqilya District (Qalqilya)

Rafah Governorate:

- Rafah District (Rafah)

Ramallah and Al-Bireh Governorate:

- Ramallah and Al-Bireh District (Ramallah)

Salfit Governorate:

- Salfit District (Salfit)

Tubas Governorate:

- Tubas District (Tubas)

Tulkarm Governorate:

- Tulkarm District (Tulkarm)

== Sources ==
- Palestinian Central Elections Commission

== See also ==
- Districts of Mandatory Palestine
