= Administrative divisions of Iraq =

Map of the 19 governorates of Iraq

The main subdivision in Iraq is the 19 muhafazah, also known as governorates. Before 1976 they were called liwas, or banner.

Under the Constitution of Iraq adopted in 2005, one or more provinces may elect to form a federal region, which has the right to a share of oil revenues.

Modern Iraq mostly corresponds to Ottoman Iraq (the provinces of Baghdad, Basra and Mosul), and also includes parts of Zor and Arabia.

The governorates are divided into districts.

== Types ==
- Federal regions of Iraq
- Governorates of Iraq
- Districts of Iraq
- Subdistricts of Iraq
