= Eugène de Rozière =

French legal historian and politician

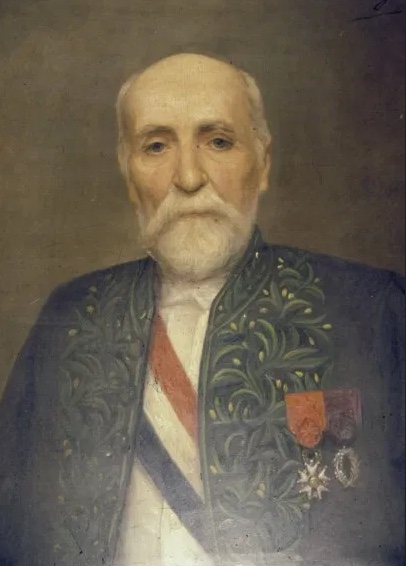
- In office 1879–1896

Personal details
- Born: 1829 Paris
- Died: 1896 (aged 66–67) Paris
- Education: École royale des chartes

Eugène de Rozière (Marie Louis Thomas Eugène de Rozière) was a French legal historian and politician. He was born in Paris on May 3, 1820, and died in the same city on June 18, 1896.

== Biography ==
From 1842 to 1845, Eugene de Roziere was a student at the École royale des chartes, where he obtained an archivist paleographer diploma. From 1846 to 1851, he worked there as a tutor. From 1859 to 1881, he was inspector general of the Departmental Archives. He was elected to the Académie des inscriptions et belles-lettres in 1871.
