= Subdivisions of Palestine =

The subdivisions of the State of Palestine are created by the Palestinian National Authority (PNA). The PNA does not control all the entities that it claims and it is only partly recognized as a sovereign state. The Oslo Accords describe different levels of control for areas named A, B, C.

There are two main areas claimed by the PNA: the Gaza Strip, which is fully Area A, and the West Bank which is A, B, C. Since 2007, two governments claim to be legitimate governments of the State of Palestine; one controlling the Gaza Strip, the other the West Bank.

In 1994 the Palestinian Ministry of Local Government (MoLG) established 483 local government units, encompassing 103 municipalities and village councils and small clusters. In addition, 16 governorates were also created. Later reforms tended to reduce the number of local governments units (municipalities and villages). The PNA is also turned towards pooling municipalities together through intercommunal entities, called Joint Services Councils (JSC), of which there are around 100.

- governorates (muhafazah) : 5 in the Gaza Strip, 11 in the West Bank
- municipalities (hayyat mahaliya, established 1994, 4 different types)
  - Level A
  - Level B
  - Level C
  - Level D: village council

There are also refugee camps, village clusters, hamlets.

The General Directorate for Joint Councils was established for the purpose of managing and running the joint projects among the local units.

The Seam Zone is the territory between the Green line and the Israeli West Bank barrier, some municipalities are located there, e.g. Umm ar-Rihan (level D).
