= Destruction of cultural heritage during the Gaza war =

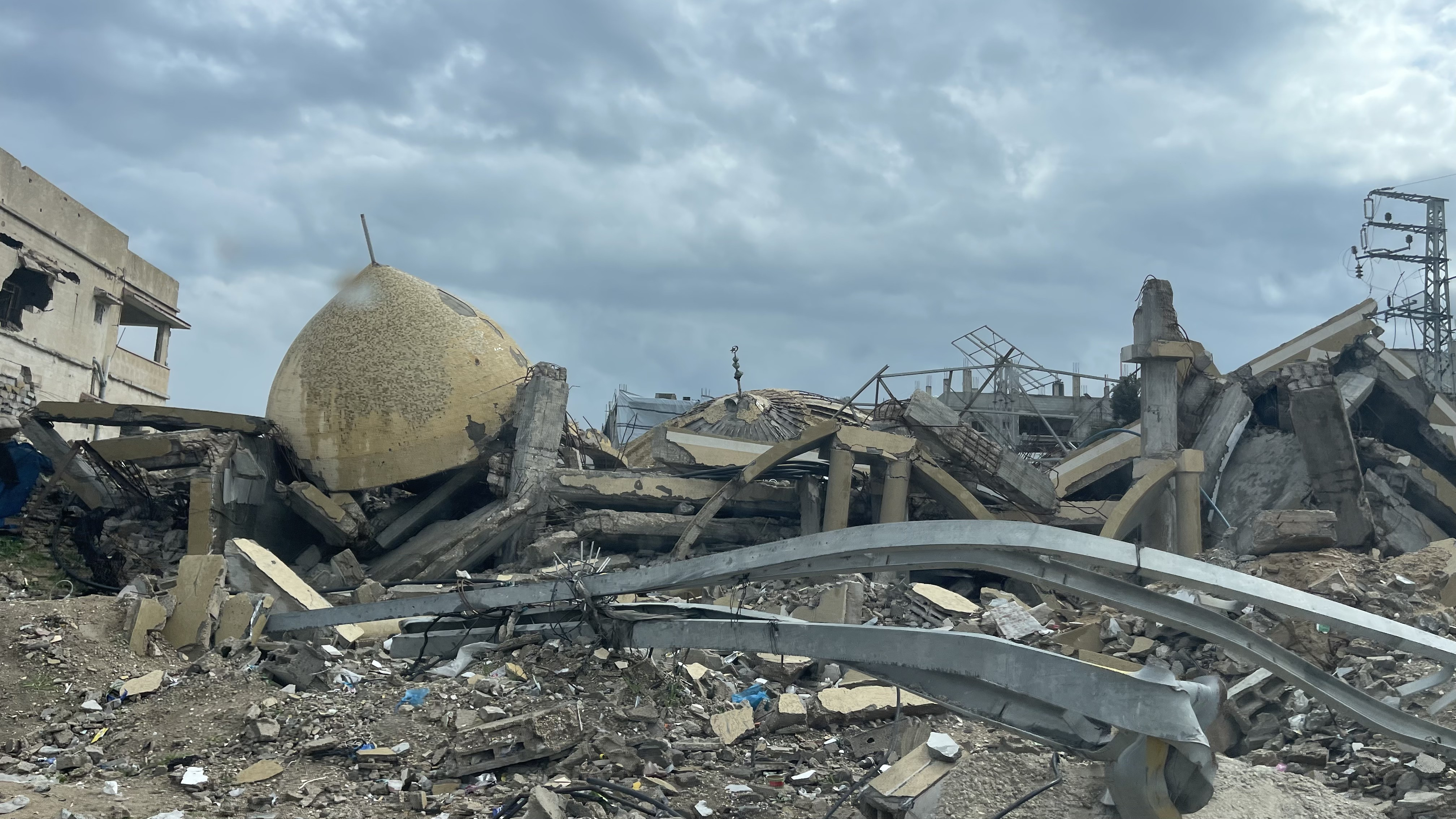
A mosque in Gaza destroyed in an Israeli airstrike, 20 February 2025. As of January 2025, Israel had destroyed 815 mosques and 19 cemeteries over the course of the Gaza war.

During the Gaza war beginning in 2023, the Israel Defense Forces (IDF) has destroyed or damaged hundreds of culturally or historically significant buildings, libraries, museums, and other repositories of knowledge in Gaza, alongside the destruction of intangible cultural heritage. Nearly 80% of the buildings in Gaza have been damaged or destroyed and 1.9 million people have been displaced.

There are hundreds of cultural heritage sites in Gaza, including more than 300 architectural heritage sites. In addition to the damaged and destroyed heritage sites, by February 2024 a total of 44 people involved with arts and culture had been killed. Cultural heritage embodies a people's collective identity. Destroyed sites have included archives, museums, mosques, churches, and cemeteries. Israel's destruction of cultural heritage in Gaza has been conducted in a systematic way.

During the war, much of the Old City of Gaza was severely damaged or destroyed by Israeli airstrikes, including the Great Omari Mosque and a compound of the Church of Saint Porphyrius – the oldest mosque and oldest church in Gaza, respectively – as well as other historical sites such as the Ibn Uthman Mosque, the Pasha Palace, the As-Saqqa Palace, the Al-Qissariya Market, and the Hamam al-Sammara. The ancient port of Anthedon was completely destroyed. Museums including the Al Qarara Cultural Museum, the Akkad Museum, and the Rafah Museum were looted, damaged, or destroyed.

In response to the threat to heritage sites, UNESCO called for the protection of heritage sites during the war. In July 2024, it added 'The Monastery of Saint Hilarion/Tell Umm Amer' to the list of World Heritage Sites and its list of sites in danger. The destruction of cultural heritage sites has been characterised by some as cultural genocide, and South Africa included the destruction of cultural heritage in Gaza as evidence of genocide in its case against Israel at the International Court of Justice.

== Background ==
=== Cultural heritage in Gaza ===
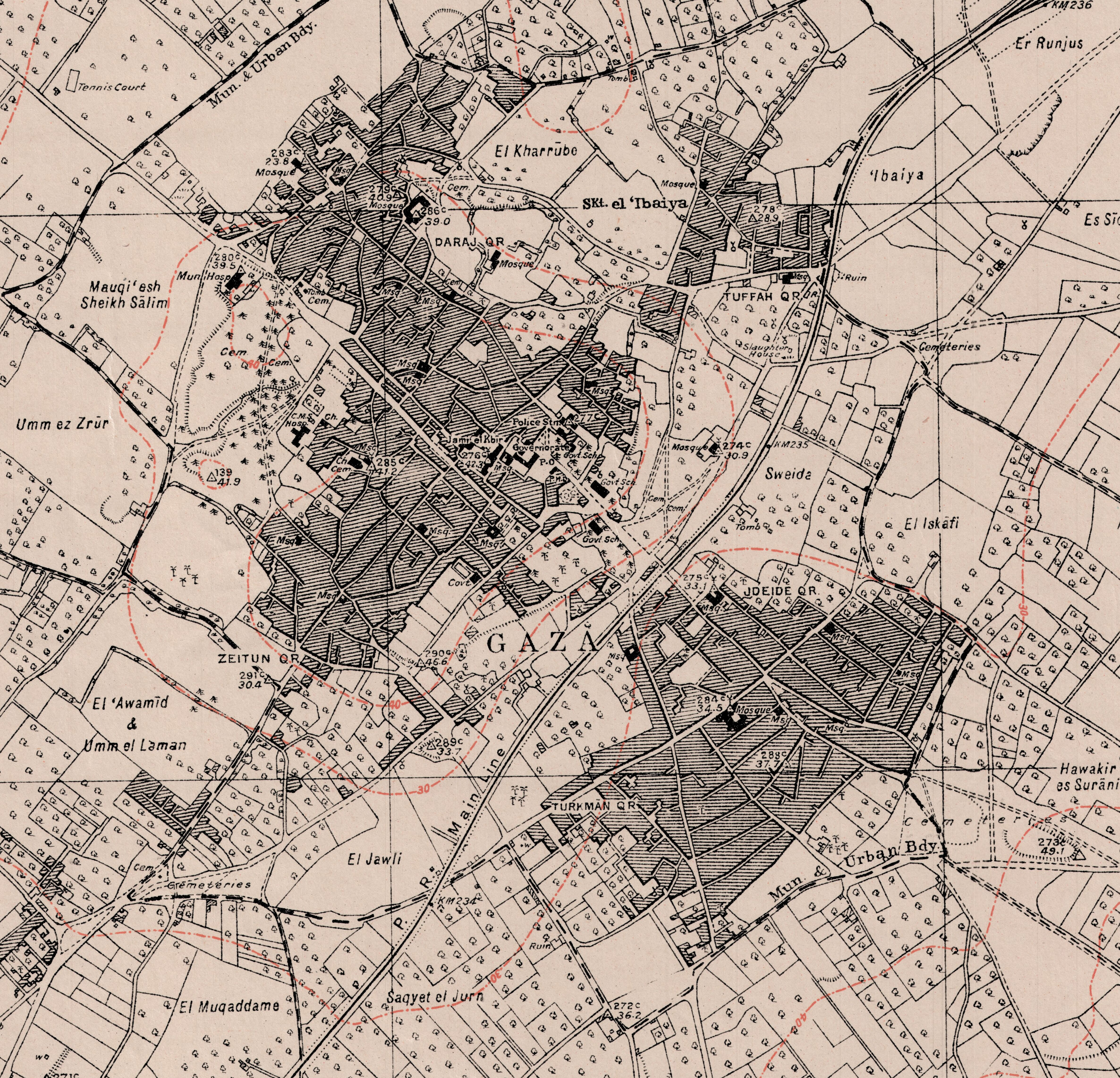
Many of the primary cultural sites destroyed were in the Old City of Gaza, the most important historical city in southern Palestine, with 5,000 years of inhabited history. This 1931 map by the British Survey of Palestine shows the Old City as it was almost a century ago.

Cultural heritage is passed down from generation to generation, comprising material culture such as artworks and buildings and intangible things such as traditions and ways of life. A 2010 survey identified 13 libraries in the Gaza Strip, and in 2017 there were five museums. In the view of archaeologist Jean-Baptiste Humbert, "Gaza's society is sensitive to its heritage, but the crushing that has been inflicted by the occupying forces over the past fifty years means that vital priorities like feeding, caring for, and educating the population have pushed cultural heritage aside as a luxury for wealthy countries."

The Gaza Strip is densely populated and modern buildings are often built over archaeological sites. In 2023 there were more than 300 architectural heritage sites in Gaza, including a range of different structures such as mosques, palaces, schools, and cemeteries. The most common categories of historic site according to the Ministry of Tourism and Antiquities are houses, followed by tells (settlement mounds) and mosques.

The historic buildings and heritage sites that make up a place embody its collective identity and history; they are important to the community of which they are a part and are an extension of their identity. Memory of significant places and events can be preserved through material culture – from small objects to buildings. For Palestinians forcibly displaced from their homes in 1948 during the Nakba, the Palestinian key has become tangible symbols of the homes they had to leave behind.

=== Destruction of cultural heritage ===
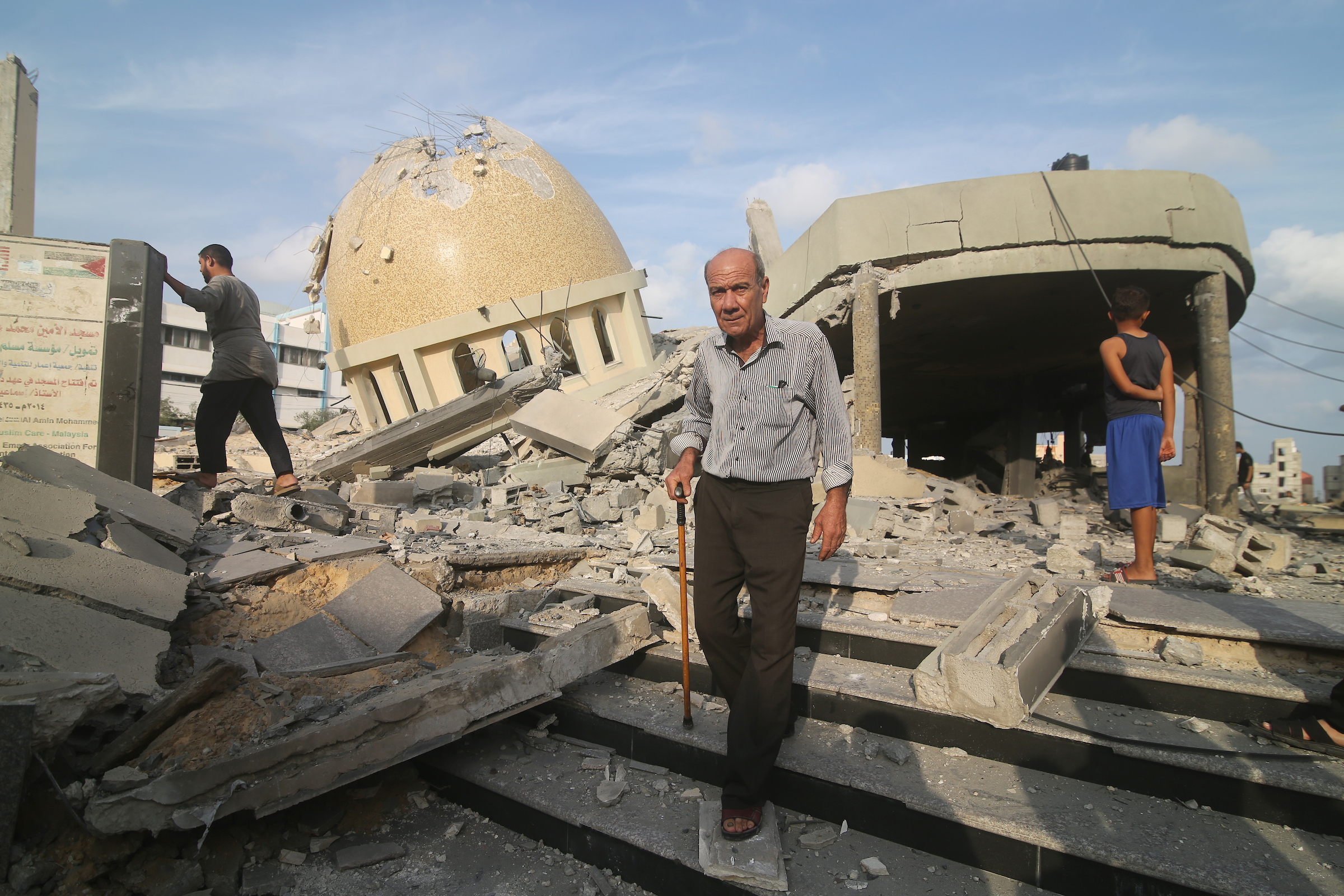
The al-Amin Muhammad Mosque was destroyed by the Israeli bombing of Khan Yunis on 8 October 2023.

Speaking about cultural heritage broadly, the archaeologist Cornelius Holtorf remarked "If heritage is said to contribute to people's identities, the loss of heritage can contribute to people's identities even more." Destruction of places and cultural heritage is often part of war and genocide and is intended to undermine a society. It has been used in this way from prehistory and classical antiquity to the modern day, notably in Nazi persecution of the Jews. The philosopher Jeff Malpas highlights the use of destruction to exert authority and control over other groups as a significant issue in Israel–Palestine relations.

Cultural sites are protected under Article 53 of Protocol I of the Geneva Conventions, and the intentional destruction of historic monument or buildings is considered a war crime. The Hague Convention for the Protection of Cultural Property in the Event of Armed Conflict requires that states "[refrain] from any use of the property and its immediate surroundings or of the appliances in use for its protection for purposes which are likely to expose it to destruction or damage in the event of armed conflict; and by refraining from any act of hostility, directed against such property". Previous conflicts between Gaza and Israel have affected the Gaza Strip's cultural heritage sites; this includes the 2008–09 war which resulted in damage to Gaza's libraries and what was then its only museum, while the 2014 war damaged more than 170 mosques in Gaza.

== Impact ==
=== Overview ===
On 7 October 2023, Hamas attacked Israel, killing more than a thousand people (including more than 800 civilians) and taking some 251 hostages. In response Israel began a counterattack on Gaza; its initial focus was on the northern Gaza Strip, and bombing intensified towards the end of 2023 and expanded to the south with ground invasions to the extent that more half of the buildings in the Strip had been damaged or destroyed by January 2024. More than 46,600 Palestinians had been killed by the time of a ceasefire in January 2025, with the majority consisting of women and children, and there was extensive damage to civilian infrastructure. Israel's bombing campaign is one of the most destructive in recent history, and nearly 80% of the buildings in the Gaza Strip were damaged or destroyed during the conflict by July 2025. The destruction has left residential areas devastated, and 1.9 million people have been displaced. In addition, the Israeli military established bases on some archaeological sites such as Anthedon.

The Palestinian Ministry of Culture published several interim reports on the impact of the war on Gaza's cultural heritage. In February 2024, they reported that 44 people involved with arts and culture were killed and around 200 historic buildings were damaged or destroyed, along with 12 museums and numerous cultural centres. Intangible cultural heritage has also been affected through the loss of centres that provided community activities and supported Gazan culture. In January 2025, shortly after the ceasefire, the Ministry of Culture began a process of evaluating the impact on the ground. UNESCO has an ongoing damage assessment and initially relied primarily on satellite image; since the ceasefire of October 2025 this has been complemented by "rapid on-site assessments". As of March 2026 it has identified damage at 164 sites. The Centre for Cultural Heritage Preservation with the Endangered Archaeology in the Middle East and North Africa project at the University of Oxford compiled a report on the impact of the war. Data collected in June to September 2024 documented damage to 226 cultural heritage sites in the Gaza Strip. On the ground in Gaza, Palestinian archaeologist Fadel al-Utol has been coordinating a group documenting the destruction of cultural heritage sites. The World Bank estimated that over US$300 million damage had been caused to Gaza's cultural heritage by the end of January 2024, part of US$18 billion damage to Gaza's built infrastructure. Restoring all the damaged sites would take nearly a decade. Following the ceasefire in late 2025, the Palestinian government and UNESCO developed a recovery plan which included a cost of US$133 million for historical sites.

=== Museums, archives, and libraries ===
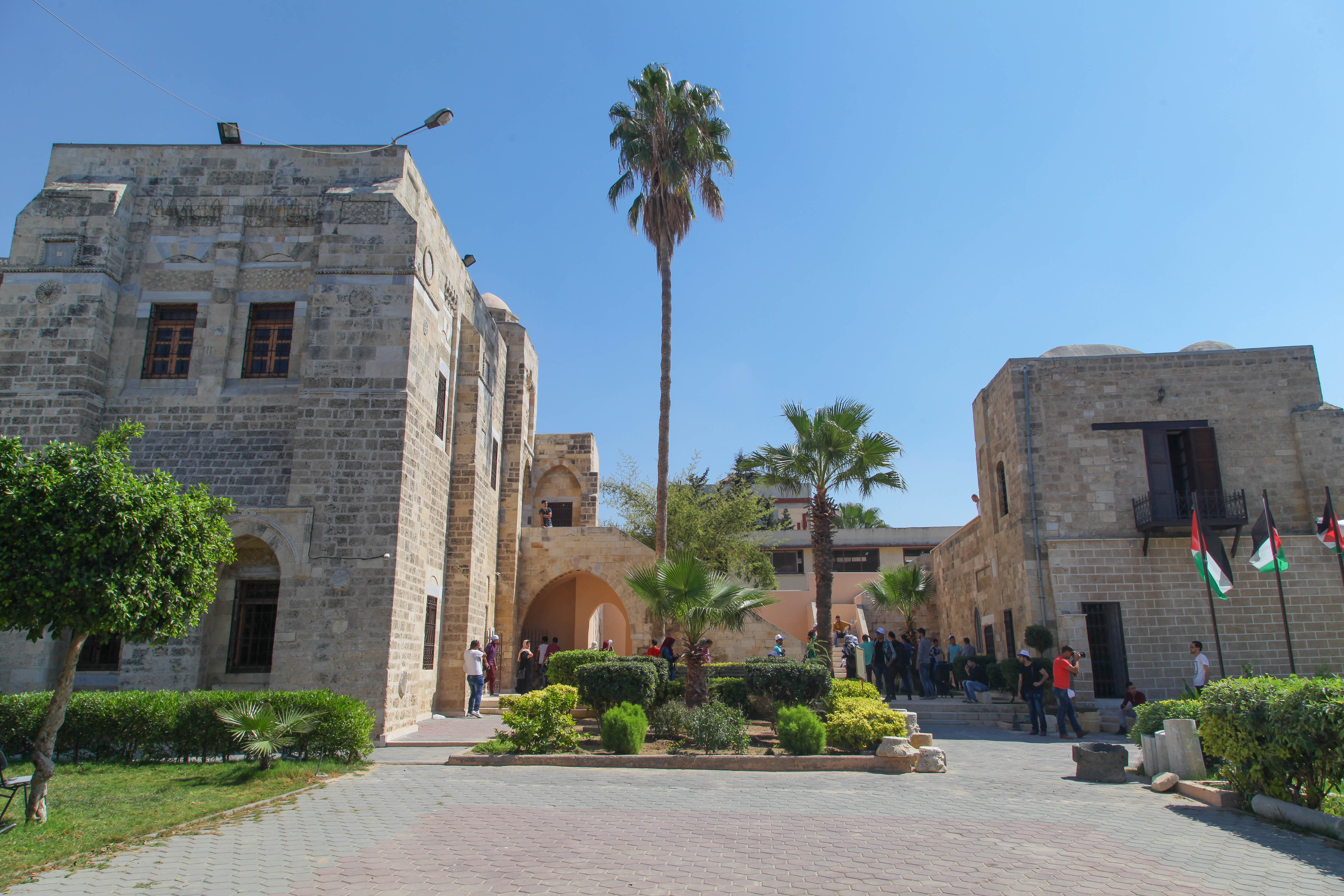
The 13th-century Qasr al-Basha in the Old City of Gaza (pictured in 2016) was bombed and bulldozed during the invasion.

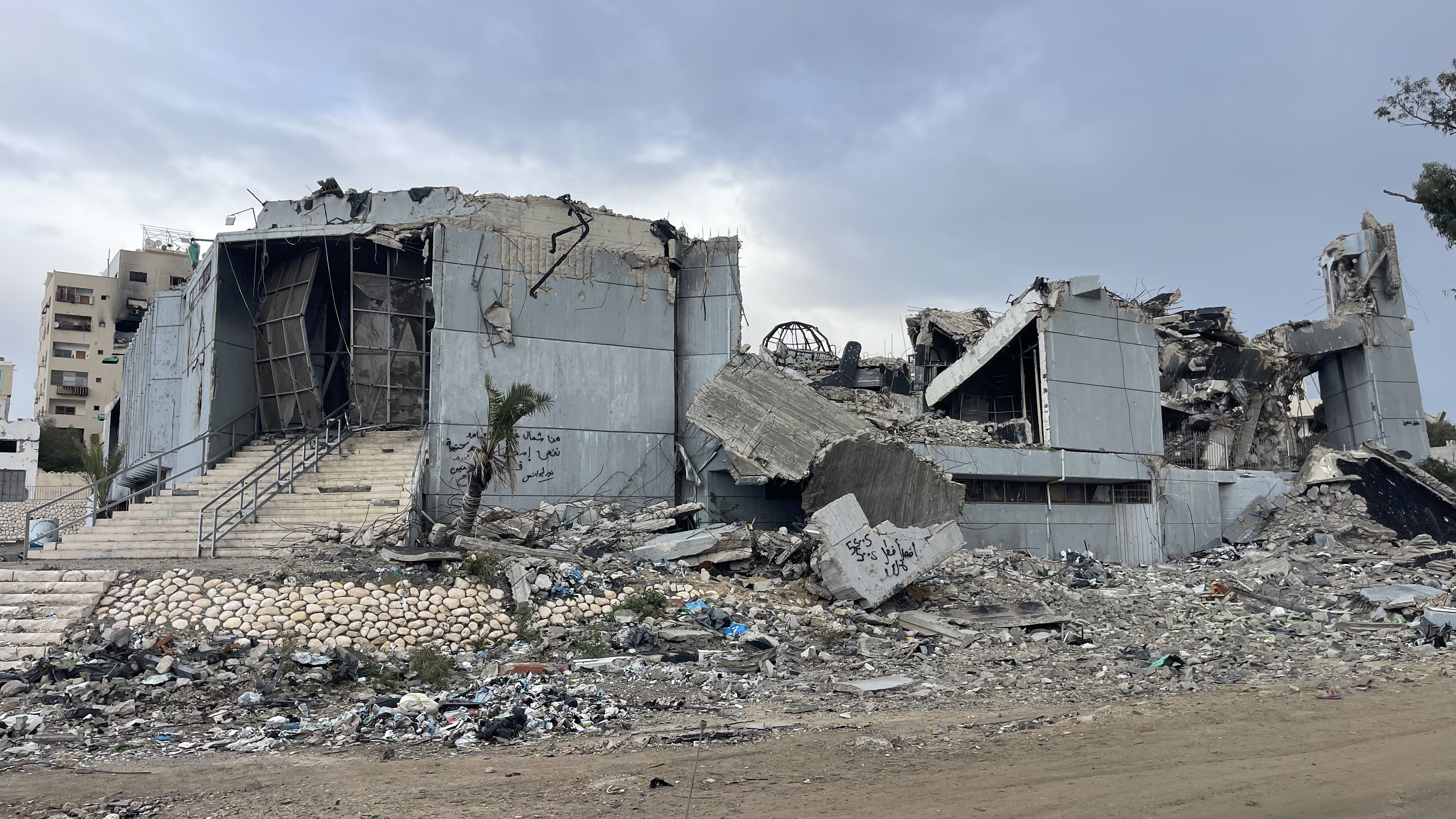
The Rashad Shawa Cultural Center was destroyed in 2023.

A Ministry of Culture noted that 12 museums had been damaged. The Al Qarara Cultural Museum was destroyed by an Israeli airstrike early on in the conflict. On 25 November 2023, the Rashad Shawa Cultural Center was destroyed by Israeli shelling. It had been used as a shelter for hundreds of civilians and contained a theatre and library with tens of thousands of books. Other libraries, including Gaza Municipal Library, Enaim Library, Al-Nahda Library, Al-Shorouq Al-Daem Library, the Kana'an Educational Development Institute, were reported as damaged or destroyed in November and December 2023.

In December 2023, bombardment by Israel destroyed the Central Archives of Gaza City which contained thousands of historically important documents. The Great Omari Mosque housed one of the most important libraries in Palestine; the rare books in its collection, which had survived the crusades and the First World War, were destroyed in the airstrike. As of December 2025, the Great Omari Mosque's Manuscripts Department, which previously held 228 complete manuscripts and 78 fragmented manuscripts (known as dasht), along with numerous Ottoman administrative records and waqf documents, was left with 147 complete manuscripts that were recovered, although most sustained significant damage, while the remainder were buried beneath the rubble. Only 35 folios from the fragmented manuscripts survived. The Ottoman records were entirely destroyed and none were recovered during excavation efforts. The manuscript collection of the Great Omari Mosque dates from the Mamluk period to the late Ottoman era and encompasses a range of disciplines, including astronomy, literature, poetry, sermons by Gaza-based scholars, and jurisprudence. The medieval Qasr al-Basha, also known as Pasha's Palace, was left in ruins after Israeli bombardment. The palace functioned as an archaeology museum. Other museums damaged or looted during the conflict included the Akkad Museum in Khan Yunis and the Rafah Museum.

=== Religious sites ===
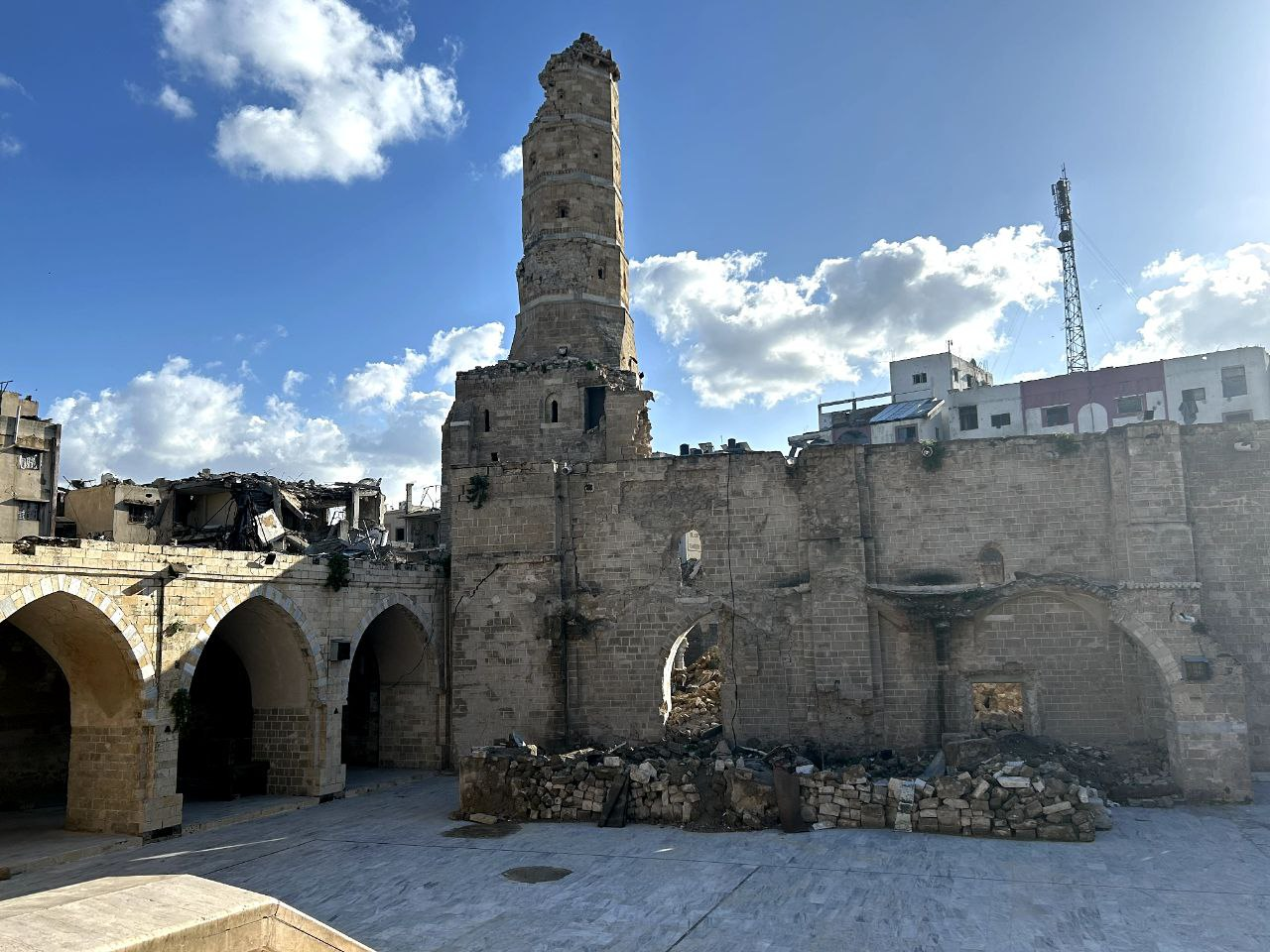
The Great Omari Mosque in Gaza City (pictured in 2025) was hit by an Israeli airstrike during the invasion.

In July 2026, According to the Gaza Ministry of Religious Affairs and Endowments, 1,076 of the 1,275 mosques in the region were completely destroyed and 165 were partially destroyed during the Israeli attacks on Gaza. The ministry also announced that 233 Muslim clerics and 20 Christian clerics have been killed in Israeli attacks since the start of the war.

On 19 October 2023 an Israeli airstrike hit the Church of Saint Porphyrius campus, the oldest church in Gaza. Hundreds of civilians were sheltering there at the time of the attack, and 18 people including several children were killed. The Sayed al-Hashim Mosque was also amongst the sites damaged during the first months of the conflict. The Omari Mosque – the oldest mosque in Gaza – was hit by an Israeli airstrike in December. 2023, leaving only the minaret intact.

In July 2024, the 15th-century Ibn Uthman Mosque in Gaza's Shuja'iyya neighbourhood was destroyed by an airstrike during an Israeli attack on the area. Further destruction was reported by Al-Jazeera in August, with the Great Mosque of Khan Yunis destroyed with explosives and IDF soldiers burning a Quran in the Bani Saleh Mosque in northern Gaza. In the assessment of Mariam Shah, a peace and conflict researcher, "Israel has targeted ancient mosques and churches, which are symbols of both historical and religious significance. These sites transcend physicality; they are vessels of faith and tradition, preserving local architectural legacies and representing the long history of interfaith coexistence in Gaza."

=== Cemeteries ===
An investigation by CNN in early 2024 using satellite imagery identified sixteen cemeteries in Gaza that had been damaged as a result of the conflict. The Israel Defense Forces (IDF) used bulldozers to level cemeteries and dig up bodies, and in some cases established fortified positions on top of burial grounds. In 2025 the Israeli military bulldozed the southern corner of the Gaza War Cemetery, damaging memorials and over 100 graves, the majority of which were of Australian soldiers who died in the Second World War.

=== Places of education ===
On 17 January 2024, the IDF used mines to destroy the main building of Israa University. The destruction of the university included its library and national museum. Israa University stated that occupying forces took over 3,000 artefacts from its museum prior to the university building's destruction. In May, the IDF Military Police opened an investigation into video footage showing IDF soldiers burning books, including a Quran in a mosque in Rafah in the south of the Gaza Strip and books at the Al-Aqsa University library.

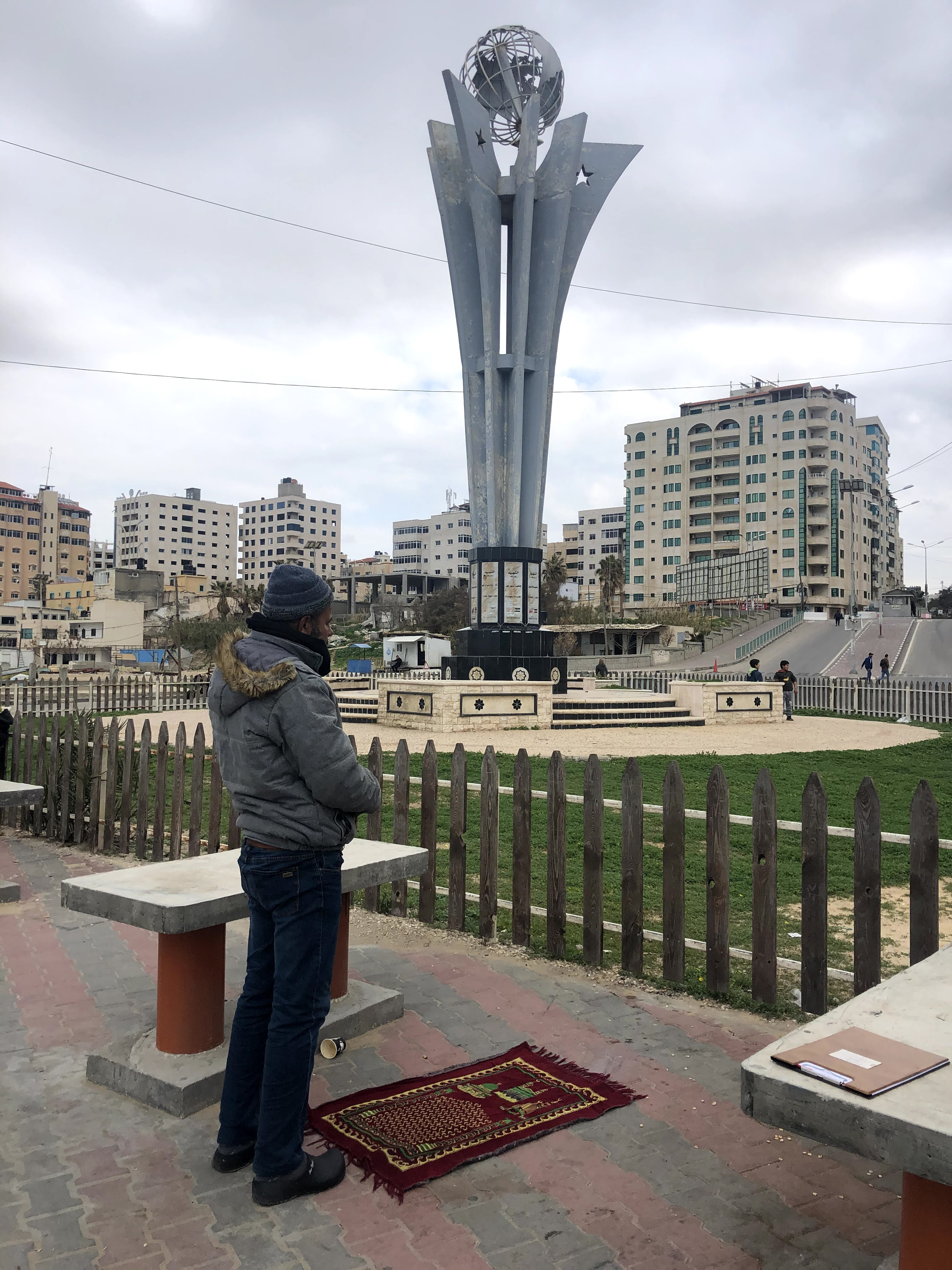
The memorial to those killed in the 2010 Gaza flotilla raid (pictured in 2020) was demolished by the IDF in November 2023.

=== Archaeological and cultural sites ===
Many archaeological sites were damaged during the war, though the full extent is obscured by active conflict. On 8 October 2023, researchers found rocket damage at the Roman cemetery of Ard-al-Moharbeen, an archaeological site discovered in 2022. The ancient port of Anthedon was completely destroyed. Analysis by the Gaza Maritime Archaeology Project of aerial photography established that archaeological sites such as Tell el-Ajjul and Maiuma had sustained damage from airstrikes by November. The same month, ICOMOS Palestine reported that the historic Souq Al-Zawiya (a market) had been destroyed by the Israeli Air Force. Tell es-Sakan, a Bronze Age settlement south of Gaza City, and Tell Ruqiash, an Iron Age fortified settlement near Deir al-Balah, were damaged by shelling.

The Marmara Memorial dedicated to those killed during the 2010 Gaza flotilla raid was demolished by the IDF in November 2023. The Hamam al-Sammara bath in the Zeitoun Quarter of the Old City was destroyed in December 2023. The Gold Market, also known as the Qissariya Market, was destroyed in December around the same time as the nearby Omari Mosque. In July 2024, the Gold Market was further damaged. The Shababeek for Contemporary Art had a collection of 20,000 artworks and was destroyed in March 2024 during the siege of the nearby Al-Shifa Hospital. On 14 September 2025, the Israeli air force struck a building housing the archives of the École biblique et archéologique française (EBAF) in the Rimal neighborhood of Gaza City. Israeli authorities had warned EBAF a few days earlier of is intention; though important artefacts were removed in an emergency operation and most of the collection remained in the building at the time of the attack.

== UNESCO list of affected sites ==
The UNESCO summary of 164 verified damaged or destroyed cultural sites identified as of March 2026 is set out below:

Site		Location		Type
Name	Date Constructed	Place	Governorate	Type
Anthedon Harbour	800 BCE	Gaza City	Gaza	Archeological site
Ibn Uthman Mosque	1399/1400	Gaza City	Gaza	Religious building
Rashad Shawa Cultural Center	1985	Gaza City	Gaza	Museum
The Great Omari Mosque (Great Mosque of Gaza)	12th century (replacing a destroyed 7th century mosque)	Gaza City	Gaza	Religious building
Dar As-Sa’ada dome and Manuscript Center		Gaza City	Gaza	
Pasha Palace	1260–1277	Gaza City	Gaza	
Zofor Domri Mosque		Gaza City	Gaza	Religious building
As-Saqqa Palace	1661	Gaza City	Gaza	
Subat Al Alami		Gaza City	Gaza	
Al-Qissariya Market	14th century	Gaza City	Gaza	
Commonwealth Gaza War Cemetery	1920	Gaza City	Gaza	
Hamam al-Sammara	Possibly 13th century	Gaza City	Gaza	
Khader Tarazi House		Gaza City	Gaza	
Storage facility of the Ministry of Tourism and Antiquities		Sheikh Radwan	Gaza	Depository of movable cultural property
The Roman cemetery (The Roman cemetery)	1st century BC	Gaza City	Gaza	Archaeological site
Al-Ghussein House/Goethe Institute	c. 1800	Gaza City	Gaza	
Saint Porphyrios Orthodox Church Complex	407 (rebuilt in the 12th century)	Gaza City	Gaza	Religious building
Sabil ArRifaiya (ArRifaiya Fountain)		Gaza City	Gaza	
HatHat House		Gaza City	Gaza	
Old Gaza Municipality historic building of Midan Filastin "AsSaha"		Gaza City	Gaza	
Ali Ibn Marwan Mosque	14th century	Gaza City	Gaza	Religious building
Shaikh Zakaria Mosque		Gaza City	Gaza	
Al-Mahkama Mosque Minaret	1455	Gaza City	Gaza	
Al-Mughrabi Mosque		Gaza City	Gaza	
Raghib Al-Alami House		Gaza City	Gaza	
Hani Saba House		Gaza City	Gaza	
Sett Ruqayya Mosque		Gaza City	Gaza	Religious building
Ahmad Bsieso House		Gaza City	Gaza	
Eid Al-Biltaji House		Gaza City	Gaza	
Abdelqader Bsieso House		Gaza City	Gaza	
Sarah Al-Hatou House		Gaza City	Gaza	
Ash-Shawwa House		Gaza City	Gaza	Architectural monument of local importance
Unknown Soldier Memorial	1949	Gaza City	Gaza	
Riyad Al-Qishawi (Beit Sitti)		Gaza City	Gaza	
Gaza Municipality building of Omar Al-Mukhtar Street		Gaza City	Gaza	Architectural monument of local importance
Building of An-Nassr Cinema		Gaza City	Gaza	Architectural monument of local importance
Building of As-Samer Cinema		Gaza City	Gaza	Architectural monument of local importance
Bashir Ar-Rayyes		Gaza City	Gaza	
Jalal Al Ghalayeeni		Gaza City	Gaza	
Abu Ramadan House		Gaza City	Gaza	
Al-Qirm House		Gaza City	Gaza	
Tell el-Ajjul	c. 2000–1500 BCE	Al Mughraqa	Gaza	Archeological site
Mahfuz Shuhaiber House		Gaza City	Gaza	
Ali Ibn Marwan Shrine		Gaza City	Gaza	Religious building
Al-Wheidi House (Basma Society)		Gaza City	Gaza	
Tell es-Sakan	3300 BCE	Al-Zahra	Gaza	Archeological site
Omar Shakhsa House		Gaza City	Gaza	
Ali Abu Al-Kass Shrine		Gaza City	Gaza	Religious building
Tell Al-Muntar	2nd millennium BCE	Gaza City	Gaza	Archaeological site
Moris Shuhaiber house		Gaza City	Gaza	
Khalil Al Halimi shops		Gaza City	Gaza	Architectural monument of local importance
Saleh Ja'rour house		Gaza City	Gaza	
Abdulhamid Ashaikh house		Gaza City	Gaza	
Ayesh Al-Ar'ir house		Gaza City	Gaza	
Ashaikh Deib house		Gaza City	Gaza	
Al-Ghussien shop		Gaza City	Gaza	Architectural monument of local importance
Hashim Abu Jarad shop		Gaza City	Gaza	Architectural monument of local importance
Jahshan House		Gaza City	Gaza	
Abdul-Mutaleb Al-Ghussien house		Gaza City	Gaza	
Abu Kamal Sahyon shops		Gaza City	Gaza	Architectural monument of local importance
Hanna Al-Ma'sarani shops		Gaza City	Gaza	Architectural monument of local importance
Habib Al-Kabariti shop		Gaza City	Gaza	Architectural monument of local importance
Abu Mohammad Skaik – Awqaf shop		Gaza City	Gaza	Architectural monument of local importance
ArRayyes Shop		Gaza City	Gaza	Architectural monument of local importance
Theater Day productions		Gaza City	Gaza	
Atfaluna Society for Deaf Children		Gaza City	Gaza	
Shababeek Studio		Gaza City	Gaza	
The Palestinian Institute of Music		Gaza City	Gaza	
École biblique et archéologique française de Jérusalem (EBAF) Storage		Gaza City	Gaza	Depository of movable cultural property
Al-Ghussein Shrine and Cemetery		Gaza City	Gaza	
House of Ramadan Al-Burno		Gaza City	Gaza	
Abd Al Mo'ti Al Mashharawi Store		Gaza City	Gaza	
House of Awni Bseiso		Gaza City	Gaza	
Al-Husseini Shrine		Gaza City	Gaza	
House of Fathi Jarada		Gaza City	Gaza	
Abdelhamid Ad Dirawi		Gaza City	Gaza	
Abu Al-Azm/Shamshon Shrine		Gaza City	Gaza	
Ahmad Al Mashharawi		Gaza City	Gaza	
Al-Jarou		Gaza City	Gaza	
Sa'eed Abdelhay Al Husseini		Gaza City	Gaza	
Mohammad Ishaq Abdo		Gaza City	Gaza	
Mahmoud Khalil Lulu		Gaza City	Gaza	
Saleh Salouha		Gaza City	Gaza	
Widad As Saqqa		Gaza City	Gaza	
House of Abu Shanab (Khalil Al-Shawa)		Gaza City	Gaza	
House of Khalil Al-Shawa		Gaza City	Gaza	
Al Madani		Gaza City	Gaza	
Khan Abu Sha'ban		Gaza City	Gaza	
Fawra & Jamal Khalaf Shops		Gaza City	Gaza	
Abu Maher Helles and Salah Herzallah		Gaza City	Gaza	
The Baptist Hospital Emergency building		Gaza City	Gaza	Architectural monument of local importance
The Baptist Hospital Surgery building		Gaza City	Gaza	Architectural monument of local importance
Othman At-Tabaa' house		Gaza City	Gaza	
Al-Bakri Shops		Gaza City	Gaza	
Physiotherapy building		Gaza City	Gaza	Architectural monument of local importance
Storage Building		Gaza City	Gaza	Architectural monument of local importance
Ramdan Khalil Samamah House		Gaza City	Gaza	
AzZawiya Al-Ahmadiya		Gaza City	Gaza	
Rabee' Al-Ashi House		Gaza City	Gaza	
Nasr Abdel Wahed House		Gaza City	Gaza	
Khalil Al-Wazeer House		Gaza City	Gaza	
Abed Mohammad Awad Al Banna House		Gaza City	Gaza	
Munir Al Ghazali House		Gaza City	Gaza	
Sowwan House		Gaza City	Gaza	
Abdullah At Tarazi House		Gaza City	Gaza	
Abdullah Shafiq Al Qishawi House		Gaza City	Gaza	
Abu Sha'ban Shops 2		Gaza City	Gaza	
Ali Ragheb Ash Shorafa Shop		Gaza City	Gaza	
Ayesh Nimer Diab House		Gaza City	Gaza	
Ibrahim Zeno House		Gaza City	Gaza	
Jawad Arafat Shops		Gaza City	Gaza	
Mousa Ar Rayes House		Gaza City	Gaza	
Rashad Arafat Abu Sido House		Gaza City	Gaza	
Sulaiman Al Ashi House		Gaza City	Gaza	
Yassin Al Barqoni House		Gaza City	Gaza	
Subat Kassab		Gaza City	Gaza	
Saed Kassab House		Gaza City	Gaza	
Abu Ayman Al-Muzaini shops		Gaza City	Gaza	
Badee' Saq Allah shops		Gaza City	Gaza	
Eltiqa' Gallery		Gaza City	Gaza	
Edward Sa'ed Institute of Music		Gaza City	Gaza	
Ishaq Al Hato		Gaza City	Gaza	
Sabri Al-Mozzeini House		Gaza City	Gaza	
Ramiz Fakhera House		Gaza City	Gaza	
Tawfiq Ash Sheikh House		Gaza City	Gaza	
Rafiq Bseiso House		Gaza City	Gaza	
Al Muzaini (Ahmad Diab Obeid) House		Gaza City	Gaza	
Mohammad Saleh Hammodeh House		Gaza City	Gaza	
Wafa AsSayegh House		Gaza City	Gaza	
Othman Qushqar Mosque		Gaza City	Gaza	
Holy Family Church (The Latin Church)	1965	Gaza City	Gaza	Religious building
Alaa' Skaik		Gaza City	Gaza	
Ziyad Al-Amsi House		Gaza City	Gaza	
Salman Al Amsi House		Gaza City	Gaza	
Al Mkhalalati House		Gaza City	Gaza	
Abdellatif Al Alami House		Gaza City	Gaza	
Eisa Abdullah Al Muzaini House		Gaza City	Gaza	
Khalil & Ragheb Abu Sha'ban		Gaza City	Gaza	
Riyad Al Alami House		Gaza City	Gaza	
Fahmi Yousef Az Zeabaq House		Gaza City	Gaza	
Bseiso (Abu Yamen) House		Gaza City	Gaza	
Shafiq Ash Shawwa House		Gaza City	Gaza	
Rafiq & Yousif Ash Shawwa House		Gaza City	Gaza	
Kamel Al Muzaini House		Gaza City	Gaza	
Mustafa Al Farran House		Gaza City	Gaza	
Khalil Al Halimi House		Gaza City	Gaza	
Murtaja House		Gaza City	Gaza	
Sha'ban Arafa House		Gaza City	Gaza	
Ahmad Ar Rayyes House		Gaza City	Gaza	
Mahmoud Al Halees House		Gaza City	Gaza	
Jamal Doghmosh building		Gaza City	Gaza	
Maher Mohammad Ali Saqallah House		Gaza City	Gaza	
Salim Ashour House		Gaza City	Gaza	
Old Al-Omari Mosque		Jabalia	North Gaza	Religious building
Byzantine Church of Jabalia		Jabalia	North Gaza	Archaeological site
"Al Mathaf" Hotel		Jabalia	North Gaza	Depository of movable cultural property
Ash Sheikh Sa'd Mosque		Jabalia	North Gaza	Religious building
Rajab Ibrahim Abedrabboh House & Shop		Jabalia	North Gaza	
Tell Rafah		Rafah	Rafah	Archeological site
English Cemetery (Deir El Belah War Cemetery)	1917	Az-Zawaida	Deir Al Balah	
Al-Bureij Mosaic	5th–7th century	al Bureij	Deir Al Balah	Archeological site
Qal'at Barqouq (Barquq Castle)	1387	Khan Yunis	Khan Younis	Archeological site
Abasan Mosaics		Khan Yunis	Khan Younis	
Al Qarara Cultural Museum		al-Qarara	Khan Younis	

== International response ==
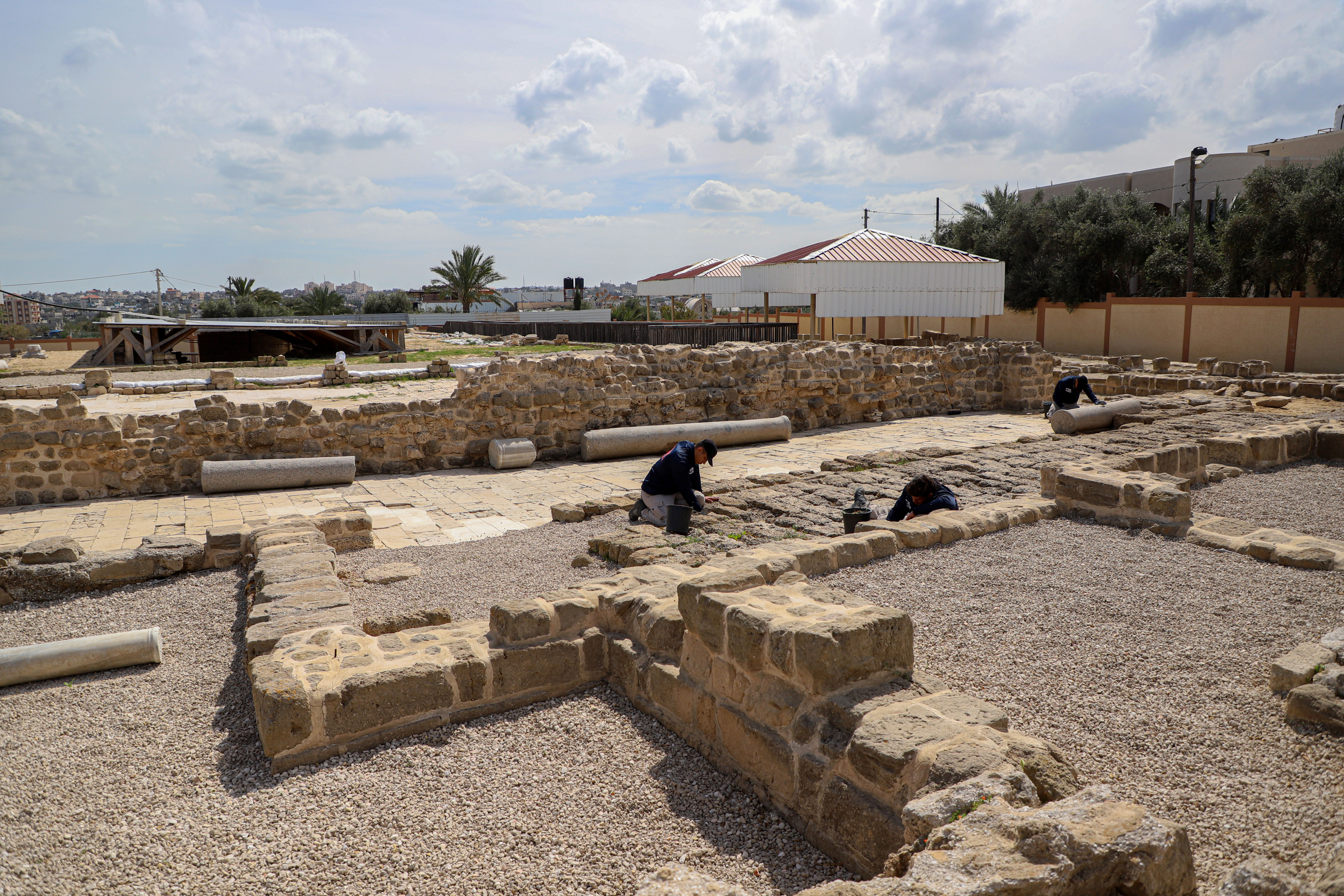
'The Monastery of Saint Hilarion/Tell Umm Amer', seen here being excavated in 2023, was made a UNESCO World Heritage Site in July 2024.

At the start of November 2023, Blue Shield International issued a public statement asking "all parties to the conflict to do all in their power to protect the cultural heritage of Gaza, Israel, and beyond". On 14 December 2023, UNESCO gave "provisional enhanced protection" to Saint Hilarion Monastery, one of the oldest monasteries in the Middle East. In the announcement, UNESCO called for the protection of heritage sites during the war: "While priority is rightly given to the humanitarian situation, the protection of cultural heritage in all its forms must also be taken into account. .... Cultural property should not be targeted or used for military purposes, as it is considered to be civilian infrastructure." It is conducting research using remote monitoring to assess damage to cultural heritage sites. At its next session in July, UNESCO added 'The Monastery of Saint Hilarion/Tell Umm Amer' to the list of World Heritage Sites; it was also added to the List of World Heritage in Danger at the same due to the war.

In December 2023, South Africa brought a case to the International Court of Justice alleging that Israel was committing genocide against the Palestinian people, noting the destruction of cultural heritage amongst its evidence. The destruction of cultural heritage sites has been characterised by some as cultural genocide, and linked to the urbicide in the Gaza Strip. Israel denied the accusations, saying its campaign is restricted to military targets. It has said that "Sites of cultural heritage and locations of historical and cultural significance are treated with the utmost sensitivity by the IDF and constitute a central consideration in the planning of strikes, with the aim of minimising harm to these sites and to the civilian population".

Euro-Mediterranean Human Rights Monitor organised a petition calling for a boycott of Israeli academic institutions as part of a response to the destruction of Gaza's educational institutions, cultural heritage, and the killing of students and teachers; it gathered more than 100 signatures from European academics. Separately, 1,600 academics in North America signed an open letter condemning the scholasticide in Gaza and the destruction of cultural heritage. The American Historical Association's members voted to condemn Israel's actions in Gaza, the scholasticide, and the destruction of libraries and archives. Employees of the Metropolitan Museum of Art in New York wrote an open letter to the museum's chief executive encouraging him to publicly make a statement on the destruction of Gaza's heritage as it was consistent with the museum's public stance in previous conflicts that threatened culture. A group of 500 publishers, collaborating under the name 'Publishers for Palestine', as the Frankfurt Book Fair (held in October 2024) to condemn the attack on Gaza and to not work with "complicit Israeli book publishers". In mid-2025, five hundred Romanian cultural workers wrote an open letter to the Romanian government asking them to "stand against the genocide, ecocide and cultural genocide".

The Palestine Exploration Fund released a statement condemning the destruction in Gaza along with the attack by Hamas on 7 October; it also stated that it would not fund or publish research engaging with items unlawfully removed from Palestine. The Institute of Conservation (Icon), the Middle East Studies Association, and the Iran Public Libraries Foundation condemned the destruction of Palestine's heritage, while PEN America noted that it was "gravely alarmed by and mourn the loss of these cultural institutions and all that they represent". A group of UN experts commented on the destruction of cultural heritage that "The foundations of Palestinian society are being reduced to rubble, and their history is being erased". In the view of Mahmoud Hawari, former director of The Palestinian Museum, the intentional destruction of Palestinian cultural heritage "demonstrates the Israeli political and military leadership's intent to destroy the Palestinian people and their cultural identity". The Council on American–Islamic Relations characterised the destruction as deliberate and evidence that "the Israeli apartheid government is seeking to eliminate Palestinian existence in Gaza and the West Bank".

The destruction of and threat to physical materials has led to increased efforts to digitise works. Supporting physical preservation and recording, the Aliph Foundation began a $1 million project in collaboration with the Riwaq Centre for Architectural Conservation in the West Bank to assess the impact of the war on Gaza's historic sites and to train people to conduct the work and document heritage at risk. By September 2024, evaluations were underway at the Great Mosque of Gaza, Al-Saqqa House, and a historic courtyard (Dar-Farah).

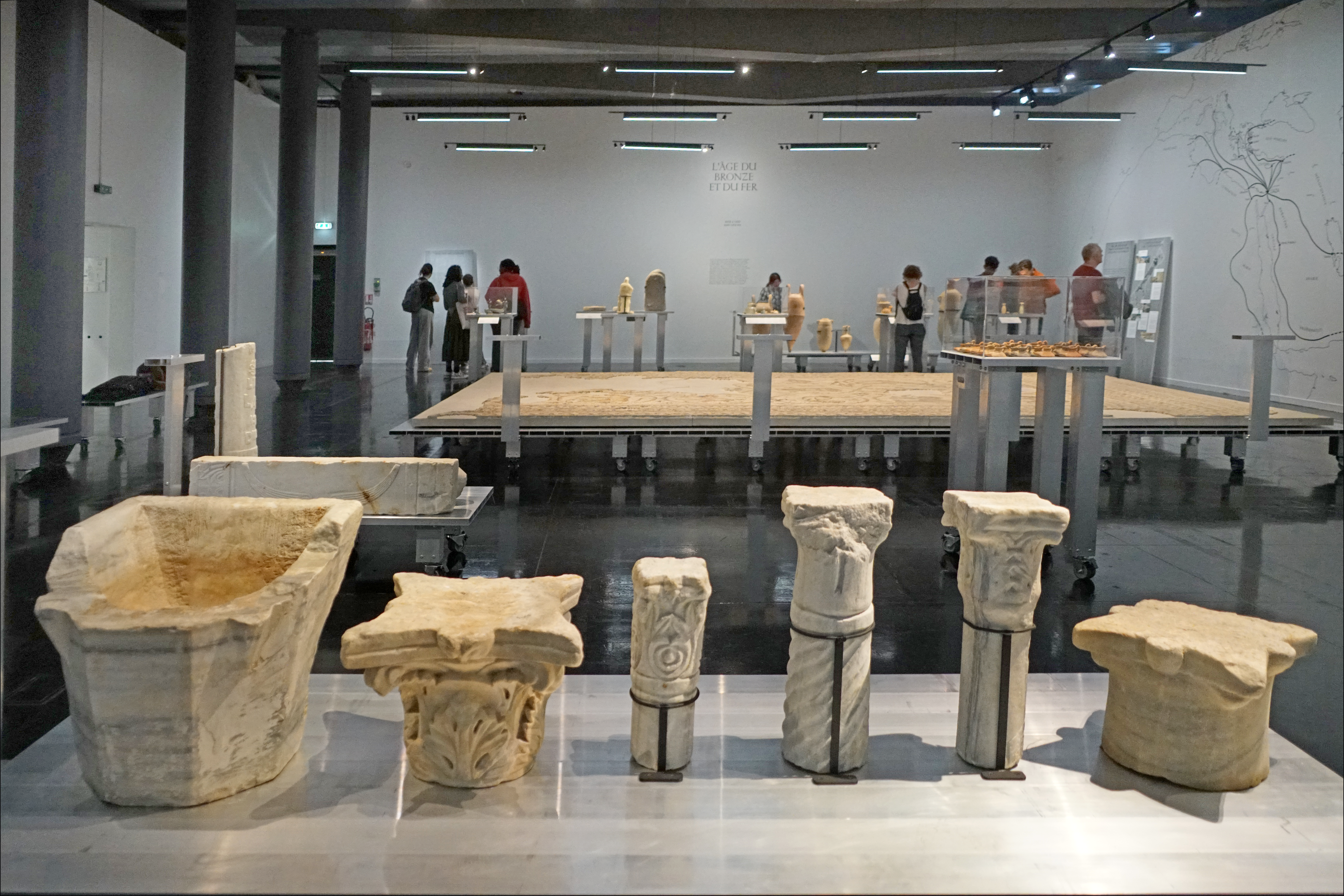
The Institut du monde arabe organised an exhibition of artefacts from Gaza titled "Trésors sauvés de Gaza. 5000 ans d'histoire".

During the conflict, exhibitions of archaeological finds from Gaza have taken place in Europe. From October 2024 to February 2025, the Museum of Art and History (MAH) in Geneva held an exhibition of 44 artefacts from Gaza; titled "Patrimony in Peril", it commemorated the 70th anniversary of the Hague Convention for the Protection of Cultural Property in the Event of Armed Conflict. Some of the objects on display were excavated in Gaza in the 1990s and shipped to Paris for display in 2000, but which could not be returned due to the Second Intifada. The MAH coordinated with the Institut du monde arabe which displaying 130 items from Gaza from April to November 2025 in an exhibition titled "Trésors sauvés de Gaza. 5000 ans d'histoire" ("Saved Treasures of Gaza: 5000 Years of History").

The World Monuments Fund publish a list every two years of historic places under threat to raise awareness of their situation. Gaza's historic urban fabric was amongst the 25 places included in the 2025 list. The founder of human rights non-governmental organisation Al-Haq advocated for the reconstruction of Gaza cultural sites as a way of rejecting Donald Trump's mooted suggestion for the US to take over the Gaza Strip. In September 2025, the UN's Independent International Commission of Inquiry on the Occupied Palestinian Territory concluded that Israel had committed genocide in the Gaza Strip, taking into account the destruction of cultural sites amongst the evidence.

== Restoration ==
A restoration plan was developed following the ceasefire in late 2025, beginning with supporting buildings at risk of collapse. There are limited resources for the work, particularly white cement and gypsum. Work at the Great Mosque of Gaza supported by Riwaq has been restricted to manually clearing rubble, with repair work deferred until suitable building materials enter Gaza. Researchers have also been working on manuscripts from the mosque's library. By December 2025, recovery work at Qasr al-Basha had found 30 out of 17,000 artefacts in the museum's collection, and many had been destroyed or looted. UNESCO and the Centre for Cultural Heritage Preservation began an initiative stabilising heritage sites in the Gaza Strip.

== See also ==
- Bulldozer politics
- Cultural genocide
- Destruction of early Islamic heritage sites in Saudi Arabia
- Destruction of cultural heritage by ISIS
- Destruction of cultural heritage during the Israeli invasion of Lebanon
- Destruction of cultural heritage sites during the 2026 Iran war
- Ethnic cleansing
- Ethnocide
- Israeli demolition of Palestinian property
- List of archaeological sites in the Gaza Strip
- List of destroyed heritage
- Psychology of genocide
- Social cleansing
- Ten stages of genocide
- War crimes in the Gaza war
- Samir Mansour Library
