= Hamam al-Sammara =

Bathhouse in Gaza, Palestine

Coordinates: 31.5036653°N 34.4637499°E

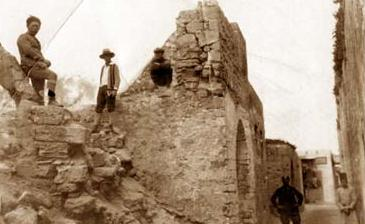
Hamam as-Sammara in late 1920s

Hamam al-Sammara (Arabic: حمام السمرا, also spelled Hamaam as-Sumara; transliteration: "the Bath of the Samaritans" or "the Brown Bath") was a hammam (traditional public bathhouse) in the Zeitoun Quarter of the Old City of Gaza, Palestine. It was situated 3 meters (9.8 ft) below street level. It was owned by Salim Abdullah al-Wazeer. The bathhouse was destroyed by airstrike from Israeli forces in December 2023; at the time it was the only active hammam in Gaza.

== History ==
Inscribed on the wall of the entrance to the bathhouse is an inscription dated 685 hijri year (c. 1320) that says Hamam al-Sammara was restored by the Mamluk governor of the city, Sanjar al-Jawli. It was the only hammam in Gaza, of the original five, that continued to function, until it was destroyed by Israeli bombardment in 2023.

Theodore E. Dowling writing in 1913, says that in 1584, a Samaritan community existed in Gaza and possessed a large synagogue and two bathhouses, and that "One of them still bears the name "the Bath of the Samaritans". He claims that one of governors of Gaza who belonged to the Ridwan dynasty, desired to acquire the bathhouse, but the owner refused to sell it, granting it instead for the use of visitors to the Great mosque, and that the indignant governor had him hanged in front of the building.

The Wazeer family who have owned Hamam as-Sammara for more than a century were faced with an ancient water heating system and traditional bathhouse that no longer functioned properly and which would be extremely costly to repair. Therefore, the Islamic University of Gaza and the United Nations Development Programme partly restored Hamam as-Sammara after it was nearly demolished due to rising costs of maintenance. The bathhouse used an old system of wood-fueled ovens and aqueducts, and for this reason, the Wazeer family had been collecting funds to renovate the aqueducts beneath the buildings' marble slabs.

== Structure and services ==
Hamam as-Sammara consisted of several rooms with varied temperatures. Customers would first leave their belongings with the clerk, then proceed to the steam room, after which they bathe in warm water. Sprinklers shower cool water on bathers to prevent overheating, and canisters are provided for ladling water. The final stage involved wading in the maghtas, a small pool filled with hot water, about a meter deep. After bathing, customers would enter the room-temperature lounge. Massages were also available. Massages were undertaken by a mudalik (a professional "scrubber"), while the client soaked in the steam room.

Bathhouses are used as a folk remedy for rheumatism and infertility, and it was customary for mothers to bring their 40-day-old infants to Hamam as-Sammara for a blessing. It had a social importance, especially to women, as a place where community members come together to socialize. Services were open to both men and women, but at different times of the day.

== See also ==
- Destruction of cultural heritage during the Gaza war
- List of archaeological sites in the Gaza Strip

== Bibliography ==
- Dowling, Theodore Edward (1913), Gaza: A City of Many Battles (from the family of Noah to the Present Day), Society for Promoting Christian Knowledge, ISBN 0-7905-6990-6
