= Rafah Museum =

Museum in Rafah, Gaza Strip, Palestine

Coordinates: 31.288°N 34.252°E

The Rafah Museum (Arabic: متحف رفح) was established in December 2022 in the south of the city of Rafah in the Gaza Strip, Palestine. It was founded by Suihala Shaheen, an activist and university lecturer, who holds a doctorate in educational studies from the Arab Research Institute of the League of Arab States in Cairo, and a doctorate in arts education technology from Helwan University in Egypt. The museum was the culmination of 30 years of collecting. Openings, exhibitions, and heritage celebrations were held at the museum to commemorate Earth Day and International Women’s Day.

== Collections ==
The museum contained thousands of artefacts relating to Palestinian heritage and reflecting the culture of Bedouins, farmers, and city dwellers. The items collected by Mrs. Suhaila Shaheen included traditional costume including women's headdresses, Palestinian embroidery, baskets, agricultural tools, legal and historical documents. The museum also exhibited rare gemstones, historic passports, postage stamps, and illustrated documents about ancient Palestine. Some of the oldest artefacts in the collection dated to the Byzantine period.

== Destruction ==
The museum was bombed in 2023 by the Israeli Air Force in response to Operation Al-Aqsa Flood. Shaheen said after the bombing:

No tree, no stone, no human being, no animal, no heritage is safe here, the treasures of my life and my toil, the dresses, precious stones, old coins, documents, the treasures of my life are gone. This is our condition, this is the condition of the Palestinian people, God help us[.]

In February 2024, Suhaila was interviewed by The Art Newspaper about her museum, its destruction, and her attempts to salvage the collection. She said "the museum was a beacon of training and education for everyone, especially women, to spread the message of science, art, culture and heritage. But the dream I had [worked towards] for more than 30 years is lost. Destroyed in moments.”

== Recovery ==
The Palestinian Museum received funding from ALIPH (International Alliance for the protection of Heritage) to enable salvage attempts to begin. A bulldozer was hired, and a group of around ten women began digging, retrieving approximately 25% of the collection. One dress was recovered in several pieces, which were several kilometres apart. The second was recovered from on top of an electricity pylon. A third dress, that of a child, was retrieved after several months, from the roof of a partially destroyed building. These three traditional Palestinian embroidered dresses were able to be smuggled out of Gaza through the Karm Abu Salam crossing. On 26 June 2025, the child's dress was put on display in the exhibition 'Thread Memory' at V&A Dundee.

== See also ==
- Destruction of cultural heritage during the Gaza war
