= Al-Saqqa House =

17th century building in Gaza City, Palestine

- قصر السقا الأثري (Arabic)
- Location within Gaza City Location within State of Palestine
- 31°30′02″N 34°28′05″E
- Location: Shuja'iyya, Old City of Gaza, Palestine
- Region: Levant

History
- Built: 1661
- Built by: Ahmed Al-Saqqa

Site notes
- Architectural style: Mamluk architecture

Al-Saqqa House (or Al-Saqqa Palace) was a 17th-century house in the Shuja'iyya neighborhood in the market in the eastern suburb of Gaza City. It was built in 1661, during the reign of Sultan Mehmed IV. It is an example of Mamluk architecture. It was built by Ahmed Al-Saqqa, a merchant. His family descended Aqil ibn Abi Talib, a cousin of Muhammad.

The house was destroyed on November 10, 2023, during an airstrike carried out by the Israeli Air Force, during the Israeli invasion of the Gaza Strip during the Gaza war.

== Design ==
The house covered 700 square meters. It consisted of a courtyard with marble tiles from the mountains of central Palestine and columns indicating the presence of a well. Its main door was two meters long. It took the form of a right angle and was darkened to preserve privacy. It included an iwan (a room for receiving guests), and living rooms in addition to the kitchen and bathroom. Major merchants and economists gathered there. It had a hall for events, including weddings, as it was the largest house in the area.

The house was built from Karkar stone or sandstone, Jerusalem stone from central Palestine, and marble from Roman stones and columns. The roof was made of sand filled with pottery, providing cooling in the summer and warmth in the winter.

== Uses ==
It was the first economic forum in Palestine. It was restored after shelling during the 1948 war. It was registered as an archaeological site in the Palestinian Ministry of Tourism and Antiquities after the arrival of the Palestinian Authority in 1994.

In 2014, the “Iwan” Heritage Architecture Center, affiliated with the Islamic University, restored Al-Saqqa House.

A senior mukhtar of the Shuja’iyah district described its origin saying, "The house belongs to a simple worker on a farm called Al-Tawabin, and he had a plot of land next to the Saeed Al-Shawa building. The narrator refers to the story from the days of Ibrahim Pasha's campaign in Palestine and Syria, which lasted ten years. One of the Pasha's guards By stealing the “capacity of gold” that was considered as salaries for his army, and after stealing it, the guard hides it in the “Al-Tawabin” farm where Al-Saqqa works. The guard is executed with the Pasha's cannon."

Al-Saqqa discovers the story and decided to build a house that matched Al-Shawa's architecture.

== See also ==
- Destruction of cultural heritage during the Gaza war
- List of archaeological sites in the Gaza Strip
