= List of archaeological sites in the Gaza Strip =

There are more than 300 archaeological sites in the Gaza Strip. The Endangered Archaeology in the Middle East and North Africa database contains information on 166 of these sites. The sites span the Chalcolithic (Taur Ikhbeineh) to the contemporary period (Al-Ahli Arab Hospital).

Archaeological sites in Palestine have been administered by various organisations. The Department of Antiquities during the British Mandate in Palestine from 1920 to 1948; from 1948 to 1994 the administration of sites in the Gaza Strip was separate to those in the West Bank and were controlled first by Egypt and then by Israel from 1967. In 1994, the Palestinian Department of Antiquities and Cultural Heritage was established, with a branch in the Gaza Strip.

During the British Mandate, there was significant archaeological work in Palestine but it was comparatively limited in Gaza. British-led small-scale excavations took place at Tell Harubah (the predecessor to Gaza City) in the 1920s, and in the 1930s Flinders Petrie led excavations at Tell el-Ajjul. While under Egyptian rule there were no major excavations in the Gaza Strip. During the Israeli occupation archaeologists from the university in Beersheba conducted fieldwork at Deir al-Balah and Tell Ruqeish.

Archaeologists Jean-Baptiste Humbert and Moain Sadeq suggest the impact of war, different administrations with different archaeological interests and priorities, and a lack of Biblical archaeology have contributed to a relative lack of interest in the region's sites from archaeologists. Writing in 2010, archaeologist Hamdan Taha said that while Palestinians had previously viewed archaeology as a tool of occupation, views were changing and "The new transformation of the role of archaeology and cultural heritage is evoking a chain of positive reactions in the Palestinian society".

== List ==
Site name	Additional names	Image	Coordinates	Type	Cultural period	Description	References
Abu Shehab			31.5279°N 34.482°E	Tomb/Grave/Burial, Temple/Sanctuary/Shrine	Islamic (Levant/Arabia)		
Al Ahli Hospital	al-Ahli Arab Hospital		31.5046°N 34.4614°E	Government/Administrative Building	Contemporary Islamic (MENA)		
al Ghussein Mosque			31.5042°N 34.4649°E	Mosque/Imam/Marabout, Cemetery	Islamic (Levant/Arabia)		
Al Mathaf Archaeological Museum			31.5478°N 34.4569°E	Unknown	Unknown		
al Qissariya	Gold Market	More images	31.5041°N 34.4641°E	Market	Islamic (Levant/Arabia)	A covered market next to the Great Omari Mosque in the Old City of Gaza. It consists of two rows of shops flanking a street. The current structure was likely built in the 15th century during the Mamluk period.	
Al-Basha Palace, Dar Al-Sa'adah	Qasr al-Basha	More images	31.5045°N 34.4662°E	Palace/High Status Complex, Fort/Fortress/Castle	Islamic (Levant/Arabia)	The palace's first storey dates to the 13th century, and its second storey to the Ottoman period. Its Mamluk decoration includes reliefs of lions, the symbol of Sultan Baybars.	
Al-Qazmari Mosque	Zofor Domri Mosque, Al-Thafar Damri Mosque		31.5011°N 34.4675°E	Mosque	Contemporary Islamic	The mosque was built in Mamluk style in about 1360, dated by an inscription above the entrance. It was expanded in 1498.	
Al-Zaiton Cemetery			31.5067°N 34.4596°E	Cemetery	Islamic (Levant/Arabia)		
Ali Mirwan Mosque	Ibn Marwan Mosque	More images	31.5043°N 34.4689°E	Mosque/Imam/Marabout	Islamic (Levant/Arabia)	While it is uncertain when the mosque was built it existed by the 14th century. It was named after Sheikh Ali ibn Marwan whose grave is near the mosque.	
Ard-al-Moharbeen necropolis			31°32′55″N 34°27′59″E	Cemetery	Classical/Pre-Islamic	Roman cemetery used from the 1st and 3rd centuries. 135 graves have been discovered in an area of 3,500 square metres (38,000 sq ft) including two lead sarcophagi – the first of their kind found in Gaza.	
Anthedon	Gaza Ancient port, Tida, al-Blakhiyah		31.5467°N 34.454°E	Port/Harbour	Classical/Pre-Islamic (Levant), Bronze Age, Iron Age, Islamic (Levant/Arabia)		
Aybaki Mosque	Mosque of Sheikh Abdullah al-Aybaki, Jami ash-Shaykh 'Abdallah al-Aybaki		31.5083°N 34.4688°E	Mosque/Imam/Marabout	Islamic (Levant/Arabia)		
Bab al-Ascalon (east)			31.5065°N 34.4669°E	Gateway/Arch/Intersection	Islamic (Levant/Arabia)		
Bab al-Ascalon (west)			31.5082°N 34.4638°E	Gateway/Arch/Intersection	Islamic (Levant/Arabia)		
Bab al-Bahr			31.5044°N 34.4596°E	Gateway/Arch/Intersection	Islamic (Levant/Arabia)		
Bab al-Blakhiyah			31.5083°N 34.4619°E	Gateway/Arch/Intersection	Islamic (Levant/Arabia)		
Bab al-Darum			31.5018°N 34.4618°E	Gateway/Arch/Intersection	Islamic (Levant/Arabia)		
Bab al-Khalil			31.5032°N 34.4668°E	Gateway/Arch/Intersection	Islamic (Levant/Arabia)		
Bab al-Minas			31.5069°N 34.4606°E	Gateway/Arch/Intersection	Islamic (Levant/Arabia)		
Bab al-Muntar			31.5007°N 34.4632°E	Gateway/Arch/Intersection	Islamic (Levant/Arabia)		
Bab al-Sharif			31.5022°N 34.4662°E	Gateway/Arch/Intersection	Islamic (Levant/Arabia)		
Beit Hanun old town			31.5414°N 34.5362°E	House/Dwelling, Settlement/Habitation Site	Islamic (Levant/Arabia)		
Beit Lahiya old town			31.5495°N 34.4994°E	Settlement/Habitation Site, House/Dwelling	Islamic (Levant/Arabia)		
Blakhiya Byzantine cemetery			31.5445°N 34.456°E	Inhumation cemetery	Byzantine		
Deir el-Balah Bronze Age cemetery		More images	31.4167°N 34.3518°E	Cemetery, Tomb/Grave/Burial	Bronze Age	A cemetery covering 3 to 4 hectares (7 to 10 acres) associated with the contemporary settlement at Deir el-Balah. The cemetery was established in the 14th century BCE and likely used into the 12th century BCE. Amongst fifty burials, dozens of antropoid sarcophagi were discovered and many illicitly removed.	
Deir el-Balah Old Town			31.4185°N 34.3492°E	Road/Track, Settlement/Habitation Site, Building, House/Dwelling	Islamic (Levant/Arabia)		
El Ghazali Mosque			31.501°N 34.4729°E	Mosque/Imam/Marabout, Minaret	Islamic (Levant/Arabia)		
El Hawashi Mosque			31.4995°N 34.4714°E	Mosque/Imam/Marabout	Islamic (Levant/Arabia)		
El Mahkanin Mosque, Jami el Mahkameh			31.5019°N 34.4689°E	Mosque/Imam/Marabout, Minaret	Islamic (Levant/Arabia)		
el-Harbish			31.496°N 34.4074°E	Building, Lighthouse	Unknown		
el-Maghazi, Kh. Inseirat			31.422°N 34.3881°E	Watchtower/Observation Post	Unknown		
el-Muntar			31.4895°N 34.4727°E	Tomb/Grave/Burial, Cemetery	Unknown		
en-Nusairat			31.4479°N 34.3838°E	Watchtower/Observation Post, Farm Building	Unknown		
er-Rusum			31.496°N 34.4992°E	Production/Processing (Pottery)	Unknown		
Es Sidre Mosque			31.5069°N 34.4704°E	Mosque/Imam/Marabout	Islamic (Levant/Arabia)		
Esh Sheik Othman Mosque			31.5028°N 34.4634°E	Mosque/Imam/Marabout	Islamic (Levant/Arabia)		
esh-Shatt			31.5382°N 34.4501°E	Watchtower/Observation Post	Unknown		
esh-Sheikh 'Abeid			31.3977°N 34.3627°E	Tomb/Grave/Burial, Temple/Sanctuary/Shrine	Islamic (Levant/Arabia)		
esh-Sheikh 'Ajlin			31.5027°N 34.415°E	Temple/Sanctuary/Shrine, Tomb/Grave/Burial	Islamic (Levant/Arabia)		
esh-Sheikh 'Aliya			31.3456°N 34.3206°E	Temple/Sanctuary/Shrine, Tomb/Grave/Burial	Islamic (Levant/Arabia)		
esh-Sheikh 'Umri			31.3552°N 34.3323°E	Temple/Sanctuary/Shrine, Tomb/Grave/Burial	Islamic (Levant/Arabia)		
esh-Sheikh Ahmad			31.5014°N 34.418°E	Mosque/Imam/Marabout	Islamic (Levant/Arabia)		
esh-Sheikh Duweir			31.4198°N 34.354°E	Tomb/Grave/Burial, Mosque/Imam/Marabout, Temple/Sanctuary/Shrine	Islamic (Levant/Arabia)		
esh-Sheikh en-Nagiyah			31.5726°N 34.4978°E	Mosque/Imam/Marabout	Islamic (Levant/Arabia)		
esh-Sheikh Hasan			31.5307°N 34.4394°E	Temple/Sanctuary/Shrine, Tomb/Grave/Burial	Islamic (Levant/Arabia)		
esh-Sheikh Mohammad el-Yamani			31.4126°N 34.3418°E	Tomb/Grave/Burial, Temple/Sanctuary/Shrine	Islamic (Levant/Arabia)		
esh-Sheikh Nabhan			31.426°N 34.4242°E	Tomb/Grave/Burial, Temple/Sanctuary/Shrine	Islamic (Levant/Arabia)		
esh-Sheikh Sa'd el-Ensar			31.5421°N 34.5125°E	Building	Unknown		
esh-Sheikh Sara			31.3202°N 34.345°E	Temple/Sanctuary/Shrine, Tomb/Grave/Burial	Islamic (Levant/Arabia)		
esh-Sheikh Shubani			31.4541°N 34.3704°E	Temple/Sanctuary/Shrine, Tomb/Grave/Burial	Islamic (Levant/Arabia)		
esh-Sheikh Sulaiman Rafah			31.298°N 34.2421°E	Temple/Sanctuary/Shrine, Tomb/Grave/Burial	Islamic (Levant/Arabia)		
esh-Sheikh Umm en-Nasr			31.5499°N 34.5241°E	Building	Unknown		
esh-Sheikh Yusuf			31.3424°N 34.3236°E	Temple/Sanctuary/Shrine, Tomb/Grave/Burial	Islamic (Levant/Arabia)		
esh-Sheikha Amina			31.3244°N 34.3525°E	Temple/Sanctuary/Shrine, Tomb/Grave/Burial	Islamic (Levant/Arabia)		
Gaza City Walls			31.5082°N 34.4618°E	Ramparts/Fortification/ Defensive Earthwork	Bronze Age, Iron Age, Classical/Pre-Islamic, Islamic (Levant/Arabia),		
Gaza Old City			31.4961°N 34.4663°E	Building, Settlement/Habitation Site, Church/Chapel, Mosque/Imam/Marabout, Market/Commercial Unit, Government/Administrative Building, Temple/Sanctuary/Shrine, Cemetery, Mosque/Madrasa Complex, House/Dwelling, Road/Track, Tell	Bronze Age, Classical/Pre-Islamic (Levant), Islamic (Levant/Arabia)		
Great al-Umar Mosque, Temple of Marna		More images	31.5041°N 34.4641°E	Mosque/Imam/Marabout, Church/Chapel, Temple/Sanctuary/Shrine	Classical/Pre-Islamic, Islamic (Levant/Arabia)		
Hakurat 'Abd el-Hamid			31.4759°N 34.4758°E	Watchtower/Observation Post, Farm Building	Unknown		
Hammam el-Ushabir			31.5033°N 34.4647°E	Bath-house, Sub-surface Material	Islamic (Levant/Arabia), Classical/Pre-Islamic (Levant)		
Hamman al Samara		More images	31.5037°N 34.4638°E	Bath-house	Islamic (Levant/Arabia)	The hammam was likely built during the Mamluk period and was one of six public baths in Gaza.	
Ibn Othman Mosque		More images	31.5001°N 34.4694°E	Mosque/Imam/Marabout	Islamic (Levant/Arabia)		
Jabaliya Byzantine Church			31.5253°N 34.4994°E	Church/Chapel	Classical/Pre-Islamic (Levant)	Basilica church used from the 5th century to the 8th when it was targeted by iconoclasts. The main survivals were the mosaic floors.	
Jabaliya old town			31.5265°N 34.4841°E	Building, Settlement/Habitation Site, Road/Track, House/Dwelling	Islamic (Levant/Arabia)		
Jami esh Sham'ah			31.5018°N 34.4618°E	Mosque/Imam/Marabout	Islamic (Levant/Arabia)		
Jami Katig el Wilaya			31.5041°N 34.4622°E		Islamic (Levant/Arabia)		
Jemia Well			31.504°N 34.4689°E	Well	Unknown		
Khan Abu Khadra			31.5059°N 34.4624°E	Market/Commercial Unit	Islamic (Levant/Arabia)		
Khan el Ma'arif			31.5063°N 34.4619°E	Market/Commercial Unit	Islamic (Levant/Arabia)		
Khan es Zeit			31.5037°N 34.4638°E	Market/Commercial Unit	Islamic (Levant/Arabia)		
Khan Yunus			31.3457°N 34.3108°E	Watchtower/Observation Post, Caravanserai/Khan	Islamic (Levant/Arabia)		
Khirbet Abu Qashta			31.2613°N 34.2642°E	Farm Building, House/Dwelling	Unknown		
Khirbet Aslan			31.55°N 34.4928°E	House/Dwelling, Building	Unknown		
Khirbet el-'Adas			31.2856°N 34.2752°E	Building, House/Dwelling, Farm Building	Unknown		
Khirbet el-Bard			31.2808°N 34.3016°E	Farm Building, Grove/Garden/Orchard, House/Dwelling	Unknown		
Khirbet el-Bureij			31.4455°N 34.4088°E	Farm Building, Building	Unknown		
Khirbet el-Esra'			31.2466°N 34.2762°E	Farm Building, Field System, House/Dwelling	Unknown		
Khirbet en-Nuseira			31.4567°N 34.4422°E	Farm Building, House/Dwelling, Building	Unknown		
Khirbet er-Rasm, el-Khirbeh			31.4367°N 34.4133°E	Farm Building, Building, House/Dwelling	Unknown		
Khirbet es-Sawaqi			31.5236°N 34.489°E	Tell, House/Dwelling	Unknown		
Khirbet es-Sira			31.4474°N 34.4321°E	Farm Building, House/Dwelling, Building	Unknown		
Khirbet esh-Shallouf			31.4665°N 34.4293°E	Farm Building, Building, House/Dwelling	Unknown		
Khirbet Ikhza'a			31.3044°N 34.3568°E	Farm Building, Grove/Garden/Orchard, House/Dwelling	Classical/Pre-Islamic (Levant), Islamic (Levant/Arabia)		
Khirbet Rafah			31.2984°N 34.2426°E	House/Dwelling, Farm Building	Classical/Pre-Islamic (Levant)		
Khirbet Souq Mazen			31.3644°N 34.3517°E	Production/Processing (Agricultural), House/Dwelling, Farm Building	Unknown		
Khirbet Zeita			31.552°N 34.55°E	Tell	Unknown		
Latin Convent			31.5021°N 34.4645°E	Monastic Complex	Islamic (Levant/Arabia), Contemporary Islamic (MENA)		
Maioumas			31.5304°N 34.44°E	Settlement/Habitation Site, Port/Harbour, Ramparts/Fortification/ Defensive Earthwork, Synagogue	Classical/Pre-Islamic (Levant), Islamic (Levant/Arabia)	Includes the 6th-century Gaza synagogue	
Maqam el-Khader			31.4186°N 34.3534°E	Tomb/Grave/Burial, Temple/Sanctuary/Shrine	Islamic (Levant/Arabia)		
Maqam el-Khalili			31.3225°N 34.3473°E	Tomb/Grave/Burial, Temple/Sanctuary/Shrine	Islamic (Levant/Arabia)		
Qa' el-Khirbeh			31.3146°N 34.309°E	Grove/Garden/Orchard, House/Dwelling, Farm Building	Unknown		
Qalaat Barquq	Khan Younis	More images	31.3431°N 34.3032°E	Fort/Fortress/Castle	Islamic (Levant/Arabia)	A caravanserai (also called a khan) along the route of the Via Maris that gave shelter to travellers and traders. An example of Mamluk architecture, was named after its builder and contained a mosque.	
Qasr al-Saqqa			31.5005°N 34.4682°E	House	Islamic (Levant/Arabia)		
Rafah			31.2972°N 34.243°E	Tomb/Grave/Burial, Temple/Sanctuary/Shrine	Islamic (Levant/Arabia)		
Rafia, Tell Zu'roub			31.3004°N 34.237°E	Tell, Building, House/Dwelling	Classical/Pre-Islamic (Levant)		
Reyad al-Alami			31.5053°N 34.4649°E	House	Islamic (Levant/Arabia)		
Sabil Al-Rifaiya			31.5038°N 34.4662°E		Islamic (Levant/Arabia)		
Saiyid el Bawdawi mosque			31.5072°N 34.465°E	Mosque/Imam/Marabout	Islamic (Levant/Arabia)		
Saqiyat el Qasr			31.4979°N 34.4464°E	Water Control Mechanism/Feature, Fort/Fortress/Castle	Islamic (Levant/Arabia)		
Sayed al-Hashim Mosque		More images	31.5079°N 34.4631°E	Mosque/Imam/Marabout	Islamic (Levant/Arabia)		
Sayeda Ruqayya Mosque			31.5°N 34.4703°E	Mosque/Imam/Marabout	Classical/Pre-Islamic		
Sheik Bashir Mosque			31.5058°N 34.4715°E	Mosque/Imam/Marabout	Islamic (Levant/Arabia)		
Sheik Kalid Mosque			31.5086°N 34.4621°E	Mosque/Imam/Marabout	Islamic (Levant/Arabia)		
Sheik Shaban Mosque			31.5067°N 34.461°E	Mosque/Imam/Marabout, Cemetery, Tomb/Grave/Burial	Islamic (Levant/Arabia)		
Sheik Zakari Mosque			31.5088°N 34.4609°E	Mosque/Imam/Marabout	Islamic (Levant/Arabia)		
St Porphyrius Orthodox Church		More images	31.5038°N 34.4622°E	Church/Chapel	Classical/Pre-Islamic (Levant)		
Tareq bin Zayed Mosque			31.4926°N 34.4735°E	Tomb/Grave/Burial	Islamic (Levant/Arabia)		
Taur Ikhbeineh			31.4537°N 34.4141°E	Tell	Chalcolithic (Levant)	A settlement inhabited in the 34th century BCE, providing evidence of interactions between Egyptians and Canaanites.	
Tell er-Ruqeish	Tell 'Akluk	More images	31.417°N 34.3269°E	Ramparts/Fortification/ Defensive Earthwork, Cemetery, Tell	Iron Age	A Phoenician settlement and necropolis established in the 8th centuries BC as a fortified city. The settlement later came under Persian control and the city walls fell out of use.	
Tell Abu el-Hawa			31.5366°N 34.4451°E	Tell	Unknown		
Tell Ali Muntar			31.4905°N 34.4735°E	Tell, Settlement/Habitation Site	Classical/Pre-Islamic (Levant), Islamic (Levant/Arabia), Bronze Age	The settlement is thought to have been inhabited in the Bronze Age, and is traditionally linked to the Philistines. The site has not been excavated.	
Tell el-Ajjul	Tell al-'Ajjul, Bethaglaim, Tell el-Nekeiz, Tell el 'Ujul	More images	31.4663°N 34.4073°E	Tell, House/Dwelling	Bronze Age, Classical/Pre-Islamic (Levant), Islamic (Levant/Arabia)	The remains of a Canaanite city inhabited in the Bronze Age. Likely replaced Tell es-Sakan.	
Tell el-Burki			31.5278°N 34.4417°E	Tell	Unknown		
Tell el-Fajam			31.3395°N 34.3489°E	Tell	Unknown		
Tell el-Fukhari			31.2882°N 34.3219°E	Tell	Unknown		
Tell el-Harrash			31.421°N 34.3328°E	Ramparts/Fortification/ Defensive Earthwork, Tell	Unknown		
Tell el-Jenan			31.3618°N 34.2651°E	Tell	Unknown		
Tell el-Khirbeh			31.5464°N 34.5116°E	Tell	Unknown		
Tell el-Masabih			31.3037°N 34.2737°E	Ramparts/Fortification/ Defensive Earthwork, Tell	Unknown		
Tell el-Mukheimal			31.3013°N 34.3068°E	Ramparts/Fortification/ Defensive Earthwork, Tell	Unknown		
Tell el-Qatifa			31.3976°N 34.3052°E	House/Dwelling, Tell	Bronze Age		
Tell es-Sakan		More images	31.4764°N 34.4055°E	Tell	Bronze Age	The remains of two settlements: an Egyptian city (inhabited c. 3300–3000 BCE) succeeded by a Canaanite settlement (inhabited c. 2600–2250 BCE).	
Tell es-Sanam			31.4636°N 34.3841°E	Tell	Iron Age	A settlement and probable port suggested to have been the successor to Tell el-Ajjul. Late Bronze Age and Iron Age pottery has been recovered from the site.	
Tell esh-Sheikh Radwan			31.5274°N 34.4578°E	Tell, Ramparts/Fortification/ Defensive Earthwork	Unknown		
Tell et Tineh			31.5029°N 34.42°E	Tell	Bronze Age		
Tell et-Tin			31.4758°N 34.4167°E	Tell	Bronze Age		
Tell eth-Thahab			31.5515°N 34.5016°E	Tell	Unknown		
Tell Haboula			31.3418°N 34.3487°E	Tell, Ramparts/Fortification/ Defensive Earthwork	Unknown		
Tell Nejid, Tell es-Sanam			31.4637°N 34.3831°E	Tell	Unknown		
Tell Rafah			31.3233°N 34.2194°E	Tell	Iron Age, Classical/Pre-Islamic (Levant)		
Tell Ridan	Tall Rīdān		31.382°N 34.2869°E	Ramparts/Fortification/ Defensive Earthwork, Tell	Unknown		
Tell Tin Fanis			31.5716°N 34.5121°E	Tell	Unknown		
Tell Umm 'Amer, The Monastery of Saint Hilarion	Umm et-Tut	More images	31.448°N 34.3664°E	Church/Chapel, Monastic Complex	Classical/Pre-Islamic (Levant), Islamic (Levant/Arabia)	A site contains the remains of the 4th-century Saint Hilarion Monastery and the settlement of Tabatha. The site is a UNESCO World Heritage Site.	
Tulul el-Humr			31.4856°N 34.4163°E	Tell	Unknown		
Turbat esh Sheik Hyas			31.5004°N 34.4641°E	Tomb/Grave/Burial	Islamic (Levant/Arabia)		
Umm el-Hajar			31.4033°N 34.3225°E	Farm Building, Watchtower/Observation Post	Unknown		
Umm et Tell			31.5552°N 34.4952°E	Tell	Unknown		
Wadi Gaza		More images	31.4648°N 34.3763°E	Boundary/Barrier, Channel	Neolithic (Levant)		
Zeita			31.51°N 34.4962°E	Watchtower/Observation Post, Farm Building	Unknown		

== See also ==
- Destruction of cultural heritage during the Gaza war
- List of archaeological sites in Israel and Palestine
- List of museums in Palestine
- Palestinian archaeology
- Saved Treasures of Gaza: 5000 Years of History
