= Rashad Shawa Cultural Center =

Cultural center in Gaza City, Palestine

Coordinates: 31.5206°N 34.443°E

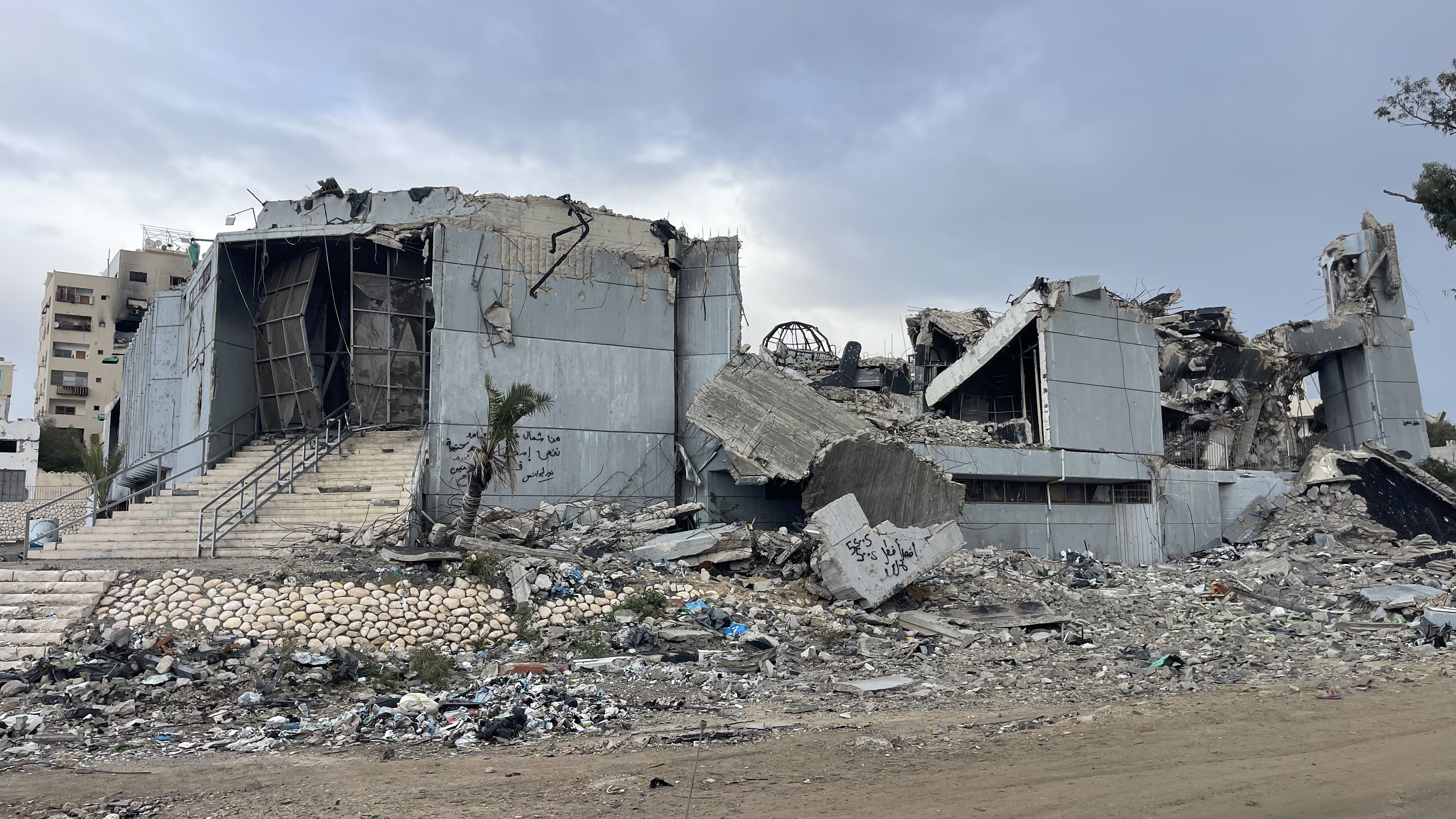
The Rashad Shawa Cultural Center, destroyed by Israeli bombing in November 2023

The Rashad Shawa Cultural Center was a cultural center built in 1985, in Rimal, Gaza, Palestine. The place was named after its founder Rashad al-Shawa, the city's Palestinian mayor who served in office for 11 years. The building was completed 1988, opened during the First Intifada, and destroyed in 2023 during the Gaza War.

== Description and function ==
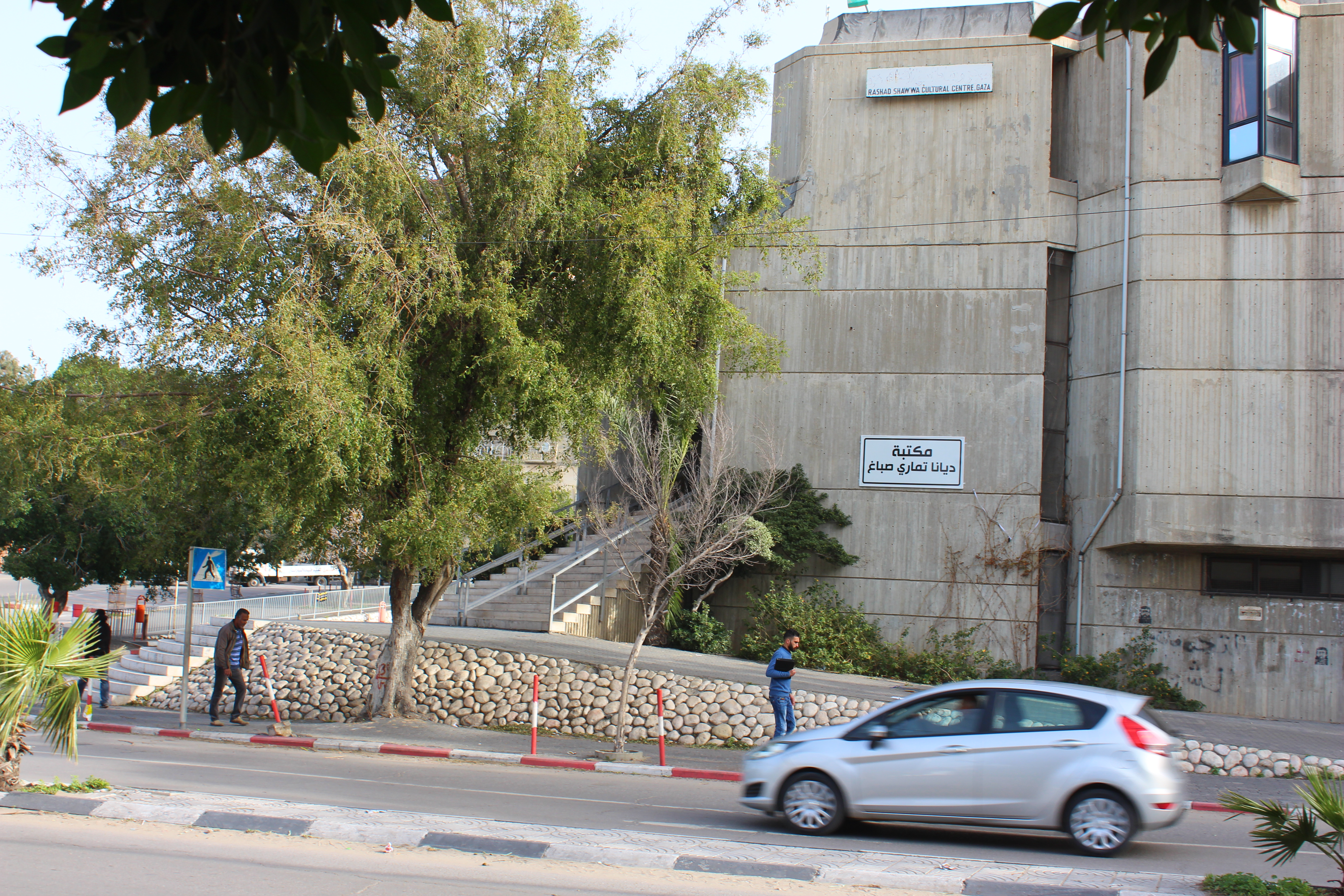
The center in 2018

The building was two-story tall, with triangular roof. The center had a meeting place, where people meet for celebrations, the Tamari Sabbagh Library, and a stage for films and performances.

It was designed by Syrian architect Sa’ad Mohaffel. Mohaffel was influenced by tropical architecture and the proximity to the Mediterranean sea, with the design aligned on a west-east access to naturally ventilate the building, a shaded southern terrace for sun protection, and an open-grid suspended ceiling for air circulation. He chose concrete as the primary construction material both for aesthetics and because it was the most affordable material available in Gaza. Mohaffel believed that despite the availability of concrete, builders in Gaza had not had opportunity to learn specialized techniques and their participation in the project would advance craftmanship in the community.

Artist Laila Shawa designed the stained glass panels in the large foyer and library.

== Events and performances ==
In September 2009, the cultural center had a three-day festival, that featured training workshops. The workshops were designed for filmmakers to learn from the films exhibited.

The stage hosted performances from Mohammed Assad, Reem Talhami, and other notable Palestinian musicians. International leaders, including South African President Nelson Mandela, French President Jacques Chirac, and U.S. President Bill Clinton delivered speeches at the venue.

In the 1990s, the venue was the site of Oslo peace process discussions between Yasser Arafat and Bill Clinton.

== Destruction ==
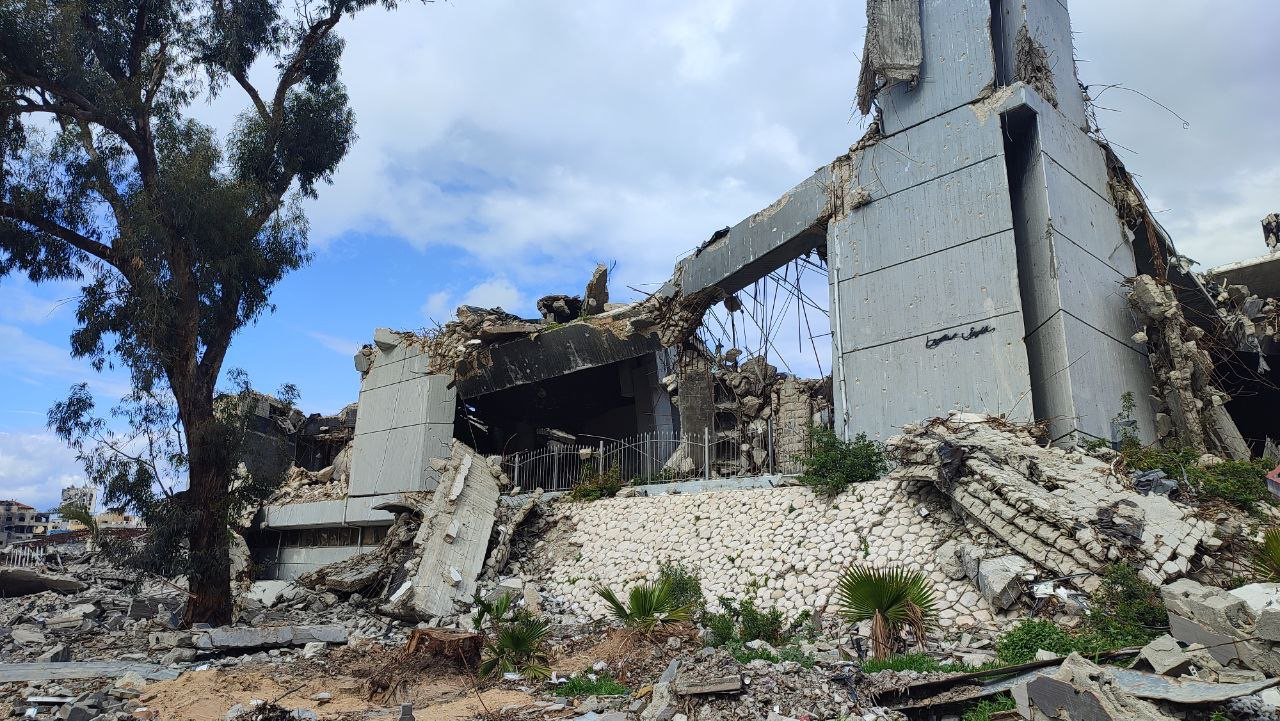
Ruins of the cultural center, January 28, 2025

During a brief truce in November 2023 during the Gaza war, it was found that Rashad Shawa Cultural Center had been reduced to rubble. Gaza City Municipality told reporters that Israeli forces intentionally targeted landmarks for destruction.
