= Al Mat'haf =

Archeological museum in Gaza, Palestine

Coordinates: 31.5486°N 34.4571°E

- Established: 2008
- Location: Gaza City, Palestine
- Type: museum
- Owner: Jawdat N. Khoudary

Al Mat'haf (Arabic: المتحف, al-Mathaf, "The Museum") is a small, private museum in Gaza City, Palestine, focused on archaeology of the Gaza Strip. The museum is part of a privately owned hotel, also named Al Mat'haf, that includes a restaurant and conference center; both the hotel and its small museum opened to the public in the fall of 2008. The privately owned museum houses antiquities discovered in the Gaza Strip from various historical periods. The museum is owned by the businessman Jawdat N. Khoudary, who owns a series of construction companies in Gaza.

== Museum ==
According to Al-Mathaf's owner, Jawdat N. Khoudary, "The idea of the museum is to show our deep roots from many cultures in Gaza. … It’s important that people realize we had a good civilization in the past. Israel has legitimacy from its history. We do, too." Khoudary is distantly related to the journalist Hind Khoudary.

The museum claims to hold a collection of 350 artifacts, dating as far back as the Bronze Age (3500 BCE). Tools, columns, motifs, coins, glass and pottery from the Roman and Byzantine periods, the Islamic period, the Crusader periods, continuing through the modern era to the time of the Egyptian administration of the Gaza Strip, which ended in 1967. Each display features explanations of the artifacts in several languages, designed for specialists and laymen alike, although none of the artifacts featured on the museum's website is identified or dated.

Gaza does not have a law requiring rescue archaeology when construction crews happen on archaeological artifacts. As a construction company owner, Khoudary instructs his employees to save whatever they dig up so that he can search it for treasures for the museums. He also pays fishermen who bring him archaeologically interesting objects. The New York Times describes the museum building, made partly of stones recovered from old houses, old railroad ties and marble columns discovered by Gazan fishermen and construction workers, as "stunning".

The museum has received scientific and technical support from the Museums Division of the city of Geneva.

Al-Mathaf's owner Khoudary noting "Hamas’s rule and the conservative piety of the population" has chosen not to display some of the objects he owns – such as a statue of Aphrodite whose gown is too revealing, images of other ancient deities and oil lamps featuring menorahs.

== Conflict damage ==
In January 2009, reports surfaced detailing damage to the Al Mat'haf museum in Gaza following Israel’s 22-day air and land strikes during Operation Cast Lead. This operation, initiated in late December 2008, targeted Hamas positions across Gaza.

Jawdat Khoudary, speaking to reporters, recounted his return to the museum in February 2009, once Israeli ground forces had withdrawn and a tentative cease-fire was in place.

Accounts described the extent of the damage, revealing shattered display cases with artefacts dating back to the Hellenistic, Roman, and Byzantine eras being destroyed and damaged. Additionally, an Islamic oil lamp stand from the Mamluk period (A.D. 1244-1517) was also broken. The museum building itself suffered structural harm, with fallen ceiling tiles and walls bearing the scars of bullet and tank round impacts.

During the eight-day Israel campaign in the Hamas-governed Gaza Strip in 2012 Khoudary shuttered the hotel/museum until hostilities calmed.

=== Gaza War ===
External videos
- Instagram video
- A video from Jawdat Khoudary showing the state of Al Mat'haf in February 2024

The status of the Al-Mathaf museum and its adjacent 36-room boutique was unclear following the start of the Israel–Hamas war on 7 October 2023. With the first reports of damages by shelling being reported on 3 November 2023.

On 4 February 2024 Jawdat Khoudary posted video footage to his Instagram account of the severe destruction at the hotel and museum, filmed in early February, after Israeli troops had withdrawn from the area. The video shows the extreme structural damage to the hotel with the inside space reduced to rubble, with some areas containing small groupings of chairs placed on top of the rubble. Outside the museum space, the curated grounds, once filled with formally curated cactus gardens, also suffered significant damage.

== See also ==
- Destruction of cultural heritage during the Gaza war
- List of museums in Palestine
- List of archaeological sites in the Gaza Strip
