= Gold Market =

Market in Gaza Strip, Palestine

Gold Market Souk ad-Dahab Qissariya Market
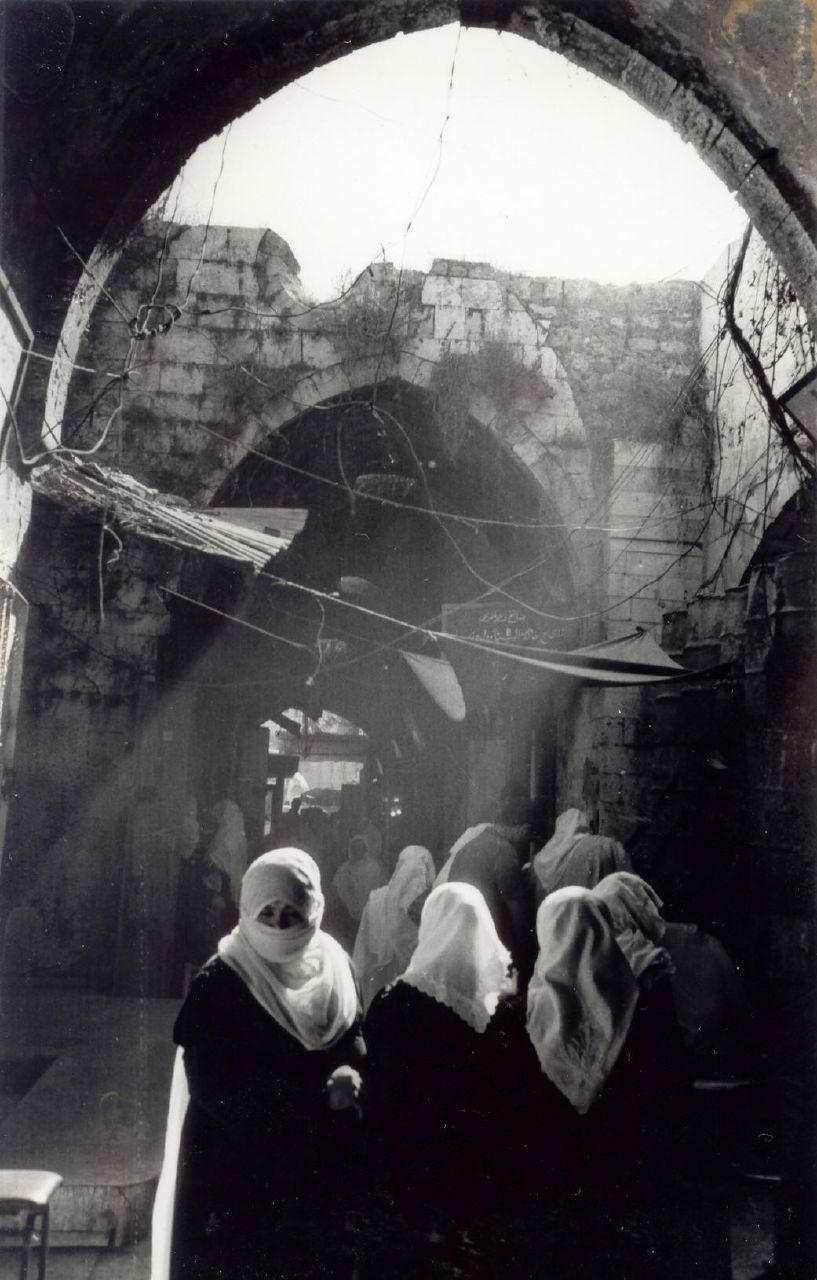
- Women strolling through the market

- Location within Gaza City
- Alternative names: Caesarea market

General information
- Location: Gaza, Palestine
- Coordinates: 31°30′11″N 34°27′50″E

The Gold Market (Arabic: سوق الذهب Souk ad-Dahab; also known as the Qissariya Market, Arabic: سوق القيسارية Souk al-Qissariya) was a narrow covered passageway located in the old quarter of Gaza, Palestine; it was both a center for trading and buying gold, and location for foreign exchange. The market was located along the southern edge of the Great Mosque of Gaza, beside the main Omar Mukhtar Street. The Market was configured with a pointed and vaulted roof above the central road, which was lined on both sides by small shops that are themselves roofed by the cross vaults of the covered central road.

== History ==
A late 15th-century document mentions a Qissariya at Gaza that was built on the orders of Sheikh Shams ad-Din al-Himsi, a qadi or judge. The archaeologist Moain Sadeq suggests that this refers to the Gold Market immediately south of the Great Omari Mosque and that it was established during al-Himi's tenure as qadi from 1448/49 to 1476/77 (851–881 AH). The Market originally formed a part of a much larger covered market, but most of the area was destroyed by the British Army during World War I.

It was common for people from Gaza to buy jewellery from the Gold Market to present to brides as a traditional gift as part of Palestinian marriage. The market underwent a conservation programme between 2020 and 2023. The market was destroyed on December 7th, 2023, by an Israeli air strike on the adjacent Great Omari Mosque.

== See also ==
- Destruction of cultural heritage during the Gaza war
- List of archaeological sites in the Gaza Strip

== Bibliography ==
- Jacobs, Daniel (1998), Israel and the Palestinian territories, Rough Guides, ISBN 978-1-85828-248-0
- Sadeq, Moain (1991). Die mamlukische Architektur der Stadt Gaza (in German). Klaus Schwarz Verlag. doi:10.1515/9783112400968. ISBN 978-3-11-240096-8.
