= Zofor Domri Mosque =

Destroyed mosque in Gaza, Palestine

- مسجد الظفر دمري

Religion
- Affiliation: Islam (former)
- Ecclesiastical or organisational status: Mosque
- Governing body: Ministry of Awqaf and Religious Affairs
- Status: Destroyed

Location
- Location: Shuja'iyya, Old City of Gaza, Gaza Strip
- Country: Palestine
- Interactive map of Zofor Domri Mosque
- Coordinates: 31°30′04″N 34°28′02″E

Architecture
- Style: Mamluk
- Founder: Shihab al-Din Ahmad bin Azafir al-Thafer Damri
- Completed: 762 AH (1360/1361 CE)
- Destroyed: 2023 bombing

Specifications
- Interior area: 600 m^{2} (6,500 sq ft)
- Minaret: 1
- Materials: Limestone; sandstone

The Zofor Domri Mosque (Arabic: مسجد الظفر دمري, romanized: Al-Ẓafar Damrī Mosque) (Note: Other names include: Al-Zufurdimri Mosque, Al-Thafar Damri, and Qazmari.) is a destroyed mosque located in the Shuja'iyya area of the Old City of Gaza in the State of Palestine. It was built in c. 1360 CE during the Mamluk rule of the region and expanded in 1498. The mosque has a central courtyard, and arranged around it are a prayer room, a library, a burial room, an iwan, and a minaret. The mosque was damaged on multiple occasions by conflicts in the region: the First World War, the 2014 Gaza War, and the Gaza war beginning in 2023.

== History ==
The mosque was founded in 762 AH (1360/1361 CE) by Shihab al-Din Ahmad bin Azafir al-Thafer Damri, a Mamluk prince, after whom it is named. Al-Thafer Damri was buried at the mosque. An inscription dated to 1498 (903 AH) indicates that the mosque was expanded around this time.

Following the Third Battle of Gaza in late 1917, in which the British Army captured Gaza from Turkish forces, the city was devastated and Zofor Domri Mosque was damaged. It was rebuilt in the following decades, during the period of British Mandate in Palestine.

The Zofor Domri Mosque was amongst the more than 170 mosques damaged during the 2014 Gaza War; the parts built in 2010 bore the brunt of the damage and repair works were undertaken in 2015. It is managed by the Ministry of Awqaf and Religious Affairs.

The mosque was again damaged during the Israeli invasion of the Gaza Strip, when it was bombed on three occasions and bulldozed. In February 2025, Gaza's Ministry of Endowments reported that 79% of the mosques in the Gaza Strip were destroyed. As of February 2026, UNESCO confirmed that the mosque was one of more than 160 cultural properties with damage, assessed on satellite imagery and on-site rapid assessments where possible.

== Architecture ==
The mosque measures 24.5 by 26 metres (80 by 85 ft) and was built from limestone and sandstone. Arranged around the 13.8 by 9.2 metres (45 by 30 ft) courtyard are a prayer room to the east, an iwan to the south, a minaret, and on the north side are a library and a burial room containing al-Thafer Damri's tomb. The entrance on the north side dates from the mosque's establishment in 1360, and in the late 20th century was one of the best preserved entrances from the Mamluk period in Gaza. The inscription dating the mosque's construction is above the door. Above this are decorative fields of trefoil patterns and geometric shapes. Several iwans were added during the mosque's reconstruction after the First World War. By the 1990s only one of the iwans, the one the south side, survived – it likely dated to the Mamluk period.

The prayer room is connected to the courtyard by two doors. This access method route to the courtyard rather than using an arcade may have been developed in Syria. The style is used at other mosques in Gaza such as the 13th-century al-Agami mosque.

== See also ==
- List of mosques in Palestine
- Islam in Palestine
- Attacks on religious sites during the Israeli invasion of Gaza
- Destruction of cultural heritage during the Gaza war
- List of archaeological sites in the Gaza Strip
