= Al-Ahli Arab Hospital =

Hospital in Gaza City, Palestine

- Anglican Diocese of Jerusalem

Geography
- Location: Gaza City, Gaza Strip, Palestine
- Coordinates: 31.5049°N 34.4615°E

Organisation
- Type: General
- Religious affiliation: Anglican

Services
- Beds: 80

History
- Opened: 1882

Al-Ahli Arab Baptist Hospital (Arabic: المستشفى الأهلي العربي المعمداني, lit. 'The Arab Baptist National Hospital'), usually called the Baptist Hospital for short (Arabic: المستشفى المعمداني), is a hospital in the Gaza Strip. Its headquarters are located in the Zeitoun neighborhood in the south of Gaza City, Palestine, and it is managed by the Episcopal Church in Jerusalem. Founded in 1882, it is one of the oldest hospitals in the city and the only Christian hospital in Gaza.

== History ==
The hospital has been in operation since 1882. It was established in what was then the Ottoman Empire as a medical mission of the Anglican Church's Church Missionary Society (CMS) following the Anglo-Egyptian War. In 1954, the hospital was purchased by the Foreign Mission Board of the Southern Baptist Convention, which renamed it the Gaza Baptist Hospital (Arabic: المستشفى المعمداني). In the early 1980s, it was returned to the CMS, which turned it over to the Anglican Diocese of Jerusalem. The diocese changed the name of the hospital to Ahli Arab Hospital.

The hospital is the only Christian hospital in the Gaza Strip. It normally handles around 300 surgeries and 600 radiological and a total of 3,000 outpatient visits per month. It is supported by international charities such as Embrace the Middle East.

=== 1948–1987 ===
After the 1948 Arab–Israeli War and occupation of the Gaza Strip by Egypt, the American Baptist Foreign Mission Society operated the hospital. The Baptist society left in 1982, and an international alliance of donors that included Church World Service, DanChurchAid, and the Presbyterian Church (USA) interceded.

Al-Ahli had a urology department. In 1985, Al-Ahli commenced its dental and ophthalmology departments, and had a large burn unit. By June 1987, there were redevelopment funds secured from a German charity, which included support for a new building, as well as plans to lease hospital land to local developers for a shopping center to provide an additional funding stream. The hospital had five dunams of land and planned to allocate two of them to develop commercially, of which one fourth of the generated income would be used to construct a new multi-story hospital building.

=== 1987–2005: First and Second Intifada ===
The First Intifada transformed the hospital's daily operations during the Intifada's first year to "manage the increasing number of casualties". In 1996, in response to a series of bus bombings, Israel shut Gaza’s borders, which halted commercial and agricultural goods transport. The hospital's annual report said this also closed off transport of medicine and humanitarian aid. Al Ahli was appointed as a frontline hospital for casualties during the Second Intifada.

=== 2023–2025: Gaza war ===
==== Rocket strike at Cancer Diagnostic Centre ====
According to the Anglican Communion News Service, at 7:30 p.m. EEST on 14 October 2023, the hospital's Diagnostic Cancer Treatment Centre was damaged by Israeli rockets, causing four hospital staff members to be injured and severely damaging two of its upper floors, with the mammography and ultrasound departments affected the most. The Israel Defense Forces did not respond to BBC inquiries about this strike.

==== 17 October explosion ====
On 17 October 2023, an explosion took place in a courtyard of al-Ahli Arab Hospital in Gaza City during the Gaza war, resulting in a large number of displaced Palestinians seeking shelter there being killed or injured.

International media initially reported that over 500 Palestinians were killed according to the Gaza Health Ministry (GHM), but this was a mistranslation of a report that had mentioned over 500 total victims, including injured. The Gaza Health Ministry (GHM) later reported a more precise figure of 471 killed and 342 wounded. A report by Human Rights Watch (HRW) questioned the Health Ministry's casualty figures. The Anglican Diocese of Jerusalem, which manages the hospital, reported 200 people killed, while the U.S. assessed a figure between 100 and 300.

The cause of the explosion is contested. Israel, the United States, France, the United Kingdom, and Canada said that their intelligence sources indicated that the cause of the explosion was a failed rocket launch from within the Gaza Strip by the Palestinian Islamic Jihad (PIJ). Hamas and PIJ stated the explosion was caused by an Israeli airstrike.

In the days after the incident, several organizations concluded that an errant rocket from Gaza was the likeliest explanation, including the Associated Press (AP), CNN, The Economist, The Guardian, and The Wall Street Journal (WSJ). Le Monde and the New York Times (NYT) rejected the Israeli interpretation of Al Jazeera and Hevrat HaHadashot footage cited as evidence of a stray rocket from Gaza hitting the hospital, while noting that other evidence was consistent with that hypothesis and concluding that the cause of the blast remained uncertain. In November 2023, Human Rights Watch (HRW) said that the available evidence made an Israeli airstrike "highly unlikely".

Investigations by Al Jazeera, and research groups Earshot and Forensic Architecture (FA) contested Israeli claims of a misfired Palestinian rocket being responsible for the blast. In its investigation on 20 October 2023, Forensic Architecture concluded that the blast was the result of a munition fired from the direction of Israel. Subsequent investigations by Forensic Architecture published in February and October 2024—the first one tracking, in 3D, each rocket in a volley of Palestinian rockets that Israel accused of striking the hospital, and the latter including situated testimony from Dr. Ghassan Abu-Sitta—were said by the organisation to cast further doubt on the errant rocket launch theory.

==== 2024 ====
As of February 2024, Al-Ahli Hospital was functioning at 30 per cent capacity and operated 100 per cent on solar power. The World Health Organization arrived at Al-Ahli in March 2024, bringing trauma supplies and fuel. In July 2024, the hospital was forcibly closed and evacuated, leading to condemnation by the Archbishop of Canterbury, who stated, "In the face of intense Israeli bombardment, this closure puts injured and sick people in even greater danger".

==== 2025 ====
On 13 April 2025, Israel bombed a part of the hospital, taking out its emergency department. The attack was conducted after patients were evacuated and there were no casualties reported. However, according to the Palestinian Centre for Human Rights, one child died during the evacuation due to interruption of medical care.

== See also ==
- List of hospitals in the State of Palestine
- Attacks on health facilities during the Gaza war
- Timeline of the Gaza Strip healthcare collapse
- List of archaeological sites in the Gaza Strip
