= Jeff Malpas =

Australian philosopher

Jeff Malpas FAHA
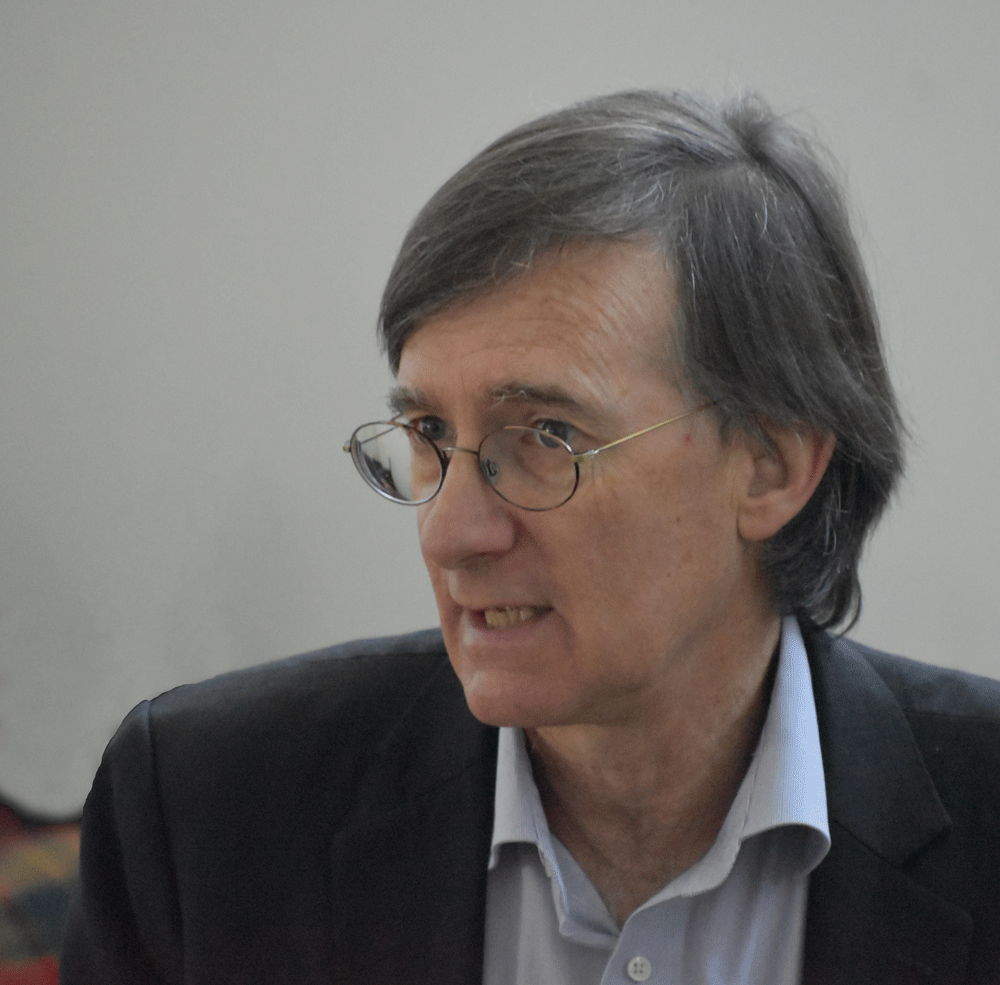
- Born: Jeffery Edward Malpas; 21 August 1958 (age 68); Campsie, New South Wales, Australia

Education
- Education: University of Auckland; Australian National University (Ph.D., 1986)

Philosophical work
- Era: Contemporary philosophy
- Region: Western philosophy
- School: Continental philosophy Phenomenology; Hermeneutics
- Institutions: University of Tasmania
- Main interests: Place and space Ethics; Philosophy of language Critque of modernity
- Notable ideas: Grounding of human thought, experience, and identity in place
- Website: jeffmalpas.com

Jeff Malpas FAHA is an Australian philosopher and emeritus distinguished professor at the University of Tasmania in Hobart. Known internationally for his work across the analytic and continental traditions, Malpas is also at the forefront of contemporary philosophical research on the concept of "place" (topography or topology, from topos), as first and most comprehensively presented in his Place and Experience: A Philosophical Topography and further developed in numerous subsequent works.

== Education ==
BA, History and Philosophy (1980); MA, Philosophy (1982, with First Class Honours) from the University of Auckland (NZ); and PhD (1986) from the Australian National University (thesis: "Agreement and Interpretation").

== Career ==
Malpas joined the University of Tasmania in 1999 and, there, was actively engaged for twenty years. During that time, he held both academic and administrative positions, including professor and chair of philosophy, Australian Research Council (ARC) Professorial Fellow, and director of university collections. He founded the University of Tasmania's Centre for Applied Philosophy and Ethics (later, the Inglis Clark Centre for Civil Society), and served as its director for five years. In 2011, Malpas was recognised as distinguished professor and continued with a university-wide appointment that spanned a broad range of disciplines, including architecture, geography, and environmental studies, and involved collaborative research projects in those as well as other disciplines, such as archaeology, design, the creative arts, history, sociology, anthropology, and medical humanities. His supervision of sixty doctoral students reflects similarly diverse disciplines and topics. Upon retirement, in 2018, he was made Emeritus Distinguished Professor. Prior to his work at the University of Tasmania, Malpas held an Alexander von Humboldt Foundation Research Fellowship at Heidelberg University and was founder and head of the philosophy programme at Murdoch University (Western Australia). He also held positions at the University of New England (Australia) and the University of Auckland, and has been a visiting scholar at universities in the United States, Germany, England, and Sweden. He continues to hold positions as Visiting Distinguished Professor at La Trobe University in Melbourne and honorary professor at the University of Queensland. Current endeavours primarily focus on select research, publication, and consultancy activities, as well as commenting on issues of contemporary ethics and politics.

== Thinking and writing ==
Malpas's philosophical work is situated amid five major themes: (1) German Post-Kantian philosophy (especially Martin Heidegger and Hans-Georg Gadamer), (2) twentieth-century American philosophy (especially Donald Davidson and Richard Rorty), (3) hermeneutics and philosophy of language, (4) philosophy of place and space (including philosophy of art and philosophy of architecture, among others), and (5) the critique of modernity (including the critique of contemporary bureaucracy and management).

Malpas's work bridges analytic and continental philosophy. His readings of Heidegger and Gadamer are characterised by an emphasis on argumentative reconstruction and clarity of exposition, while his interpretation and development of Davidson’s thought emphasises the broader philosophical and meta-philosophical elements of the Davidsonian position (and, so, places greater emphasis on Davidson’s later writings as providing the framework for reading Davidson’s work as a whole).

Malpas has devoted considerable attention to the idea of the transcendental, particularly as it links with hermeneutic themes, and places special emphasis on notions of ground and limit. He sees the transcendental as providing an important point of connection between philosophers such as Davidson, Gadamer, and Heidegger, even as it also connects to Malpas’s own development of what he has termed “philosophical topography.”

The latter idea not only draws on phenomenological and hermeneutic resources but also is heavily indebted to analytic approaches in philosophy of mind and of language. Distinguishing his work, in this realm, is the detailed conceptual analysis of topographical and spatial notions, the methodological implications that it associates with the focus on place, and the topographical analysis of self and identity. As developed in his Place and Experience: A Philosophical Topography, Malpas sees place as “a complex but unitary structure that encompasses self and other, space and time, subjectivity and objectivity.” He argues for an “externalist” conception of self and mind, according to which human lives are indissolubly linked to the places in which those lives are lived. Indeed, he posits that the importance of place lies, not so much in the experience that one might have of place (or of a particular place), but in the fact that it is in place that all experience, thought, and identity are made possible—that place is that in and through which all things are grounded and all things happen.

Two of his subsequent volumes—Heidegger’s Topology: Being, Place, World (2006) and Heidegger and the Thinking of Place: Explorations in the Topology of Being (2012)—provide more specific analyses of the notions of place and “topology” found in the work of Martin Heidegger (who, himself, refers to his thinking as a “topology of Being”). And, even more specifically, Malpas examines a central aspect of Heidegger’s topological thinking—particularly as related to architecture and other spatial disciplines—in his Rethinking Dwelling: Heidegger, Place, Architecture (2021). His readings represent a distinctive position within the Heidegger literature.

Moreover, Malpas's engagement with the idea of place undergirds his thinking and writing about ethics, and especially about a perceived loss of ethical commitment in contemporary culture and society—the result, he contends, of the rise of corporatized, bureaucratic models within public life and institutions, and, with that, an ideology of compliance that undermines ethical conduct. In response to such loss, he proposes that ethics be seen as grounded in a prior commitment to the communities of which we are a part—fundamentally, therefore, as grounded in place.

== Teaching and invited presentations ==
Although his positions have been primarily in research, Malpas has also taught across nearly all areas of philosophy, from ethics to logic, and has additionally lectured in related fields, including architecture, landscape architecture, geography, and other spatial disciplines. He has also presented invited papers for at least twelve international university audiences. Beyond academe, he has been invited to lead workshops and seminars for groups in government and business.

== Engagement and critique by others ==
The main charge levelled against Malpas’s “philosophical topography” is that the notion of place is inherently regressive and conservative—as typified in an article by John Wylie, for example. Malpas has responded to such charges, contesting the assumptions about both place and belonging on which they rest, as well as their reliance on certain ideological presuppositions rather than genuine engagement with the issues at stake.

Malpas’s emphasis on mortality and finitude as essential to the human, and to the very possibility of a life, has been specifically taken up in various discussions, including that in an essay by Nick Trakakis.

A broader engagement and critique of Malpas’s work has appeared in papers presented in the International Journal of Philosophical Studies and, by Paloma Puerte-Lozano, in Place, Space, and Hermeneutics.

Such engagement has not been limited to philosophy, but has extended to other fields as well. In theology, for example, British theologian Mark Wynn has drawn on Malpas’s work in order to examine connections between the philosophy of place and philosophical theology. And in sociology, Malpas has published with sociologists such as Gary Wickham and Keith Jacobs.

== Recognition ==
=== Scholarly organizations ===
- Vice-president and Distinguished Fellow, Australian Association of Humboldt Fellows
- Fellow, Australian Academy of the Humanities (2018)

=== Grants, prizes, and awards ===
| 1989 and 1993 | Murdoch University Special Research Grant |
| 1994 | Australian Research Council Large Grant (for 1995-96): “Body and Place” |
| 1997 | Humboldt Research Fellowship (for 1998-1999), Heidelberg University |
| 1999 | Bill Myers Prize, Australasian Journal of Political Science (joint winner with Gary Wickham) |
| 2000 | Australian Research Council Large Grant (for 2001-03): “Heidegger’s Topology of Being” |
| 2002 | Australian Research Council Linkage Grant (for 2003-04), with Jonathan Holmes, Paul Zika, David Hansen, and Maria Kunda: “The Shifting Locus of Artistic Practice” |
| 2003 | Australian Research Council Discovery Grant (for 2004-06), with Andrew Benjamin: “Between the Outback and the Sea: The Place of Cosmopolitanism in Contemporary Australia” |
| 2004 | Humboldt Research Fellowship (resumption), LMU Munich |
| 2005 | Australian Research Council Discovery Grant (for 2006-08), with Andrew Brennan: “Making Ethics Work: A New Model for Business and Organizational Ethics” |
| 2005 | University of Tasmania, Vice-Chancellor’s Award for Outstanding Community Engagement |
| 2006 | Australian Research Council, Australian Professorial Fellowship (for 2007-2012): “Ethos and Topos: Towards an Ethics and Politics of Place” |
| 2006 | University of Tasmania, Inaugural Postgraduate Supervision Award |
| 2007 | Australian Research Council International Linkage Award (for 2008-09), with Karsten Thiel: “Genealogy and Topology: A Constellational Comparison of Nietzsche and Heidegger” |
| 2008 | Humboldt Research Fellowship (resumption), LMU Munich |
| 2010 | Humboldt Research Fellowship (resumption), Husserl-Archiv, University of Freiburg |
| 2014 | Henrietta Harvey Lecturer, Memorial University of Newfoundland, St. John's, Newfoundland |
| 2015 | Australian Research Council Discovery Grant (for 2016-18), with Andrew Benjamin: “Place, Commonality, and the Human: Towards a New Philosophical Anthropology” (Philosophy) |
| 2016 | Australian Research Council Discovery Grant (for 2017–19), with Mark Burry, et al.: “Place and Parametricism: Provocations for the Rethinking of Design” (Architecture) |

=== Visiting positions ===
| 1992 and 1997 | Visiting Scholar: Department of Philosophy, University of California at Berkeley, Berkeley, California, USA |
| 1997 | Visiting Professor: Department of Philosophy, Uppsala University, Uppsala, Sweden |
| 1998 (May) | Visiting Professor: Department of Philosophy, Umeå University, Umea, Sweden |
| 1997 – 1999 | Humboldt Research Fellow: Heidelberg University, Germany |
| 2000 | Visiting Research Fellow: Humanities Research Center, University of California at Irvine, Irvine, California, USA |
| 2004 (May) | Visiting Professor: Department of Philosophy, University of Auckland, NZ |
| 2004 | Humboldt Research Fellow: LMU Munich, Germany |
| 2008 | Humboldt Research Fellow: LMU Munich, Germany |
| 2010 | Humboldt Research Fellow: Husserl-Archiv, University of Freiburg, Germany |

=== Significant appointments ===
| 1999 – continuing | Member, Editorial Board: International Journal of Philosophical Studies |
| 2008 – continuing | Member, Scientific Board: Tropos. Rivista di ermeneutica e critica filosofica |
| 2009 – continuing | Member, Scientific Board: Mimesis Group (international publishers) |
| 2010 – continuing | Member, Editorial Board: Interstices—Journal of Architecture and Related Arts |
| 2013 – continuing | Member, Editorial Board: Annals in Social Responsibility |
| 2013 – continuing | Member, Editorial Board: Encyclopedia of Global Bioethics |
| 2014 – continuing | Member, Editorial Board: Montreal Architectural Review, University of Montreal |
| 2014 – continuing | Co-editor (with Claude Romano): Contributions to Hermeneutics, Book Series, Dordrecht, Springer Verlag |
| 2015 – continuing | Member, Editorial Board: Études Phénoménologiques / Phenomenological Studies |
| 2014 – continuing | Co-editor (with Claude Romano): Contributions to Hermeneutics, Book Series, Dordrecht, Springer Verlag |
| 2016 – continuing | Member, Editorial Board: Journal of Philosophy of History |
| 2021 – continuing | Co-editor (with Jessica Dubow): Toposophia: Sustainability, Dwelling, Design, Book Series, Lanham, Rowman and Littlefield |
| 2012 – 2019 | Member, Editorial Board: Journal of Island Studies |
| 2018, 2016, and 2014 | European Research Council, Panel Member |
| 2010 – 2012 | Member, Editorial Board: Purliew |
| 2005 – 2010 | Member, Editorial Board: Ethics, Place and Environment |
| 2009 | Advisor, Future Fellowships Advisory Committee: Australian Research Council |
| 1997 – 2008 | Member, Editorial Board: Australasian Journal of Philosophy |
| 2000 – 2008 | Corresponding Editor: International Journal of Philosophical Studies |
| 2004 – 2006 | Advisor, Humanities and Creative Arts Panel: Australian Research Council |
| 1999 – 2006 | Director: Buddhist Studies in India Exchange Program |
| 2000 – 2005 | Director (and Founder): Centre for Applied Philosophy and Ethics, University of Tasmania |
| 2000 – 2005 | Member, Editorial Board: Philosophy and Geography |
| 1999 – 2004, and 2005 | Head, School of Philosophy, University of Tasmania |
| 2001 – 2002 | President: Australasian Association of Philosophy |

== Selected publications ==
=== Monographs ===
Malpas has authored (or co-authored) eight monographs, including:

———. In the Brightness of Place: Topological Thinking In and After Heidegger. Albany, NY: SUNY Press, forthcoming 2022.

———. Rethinking Dwelling: Heidegger, Place, Architecture. London: Bloomsbury, 2021.

——— and Kenneth White. The Fundamental Field: Thought, Poetics, World. Edinburgh: Edinburgh University Press, 2021.

———. Place and Experience: A Philosophical Topography. 2nd, rev. ed. London: Routledge, 2018. First published 1999, by Cambridge University Press.

———. Heidegger and the Thinking of Place: Explorations in the Topology of Being. Cambridge, MA: MIT Press, 2012.

———. Heidegger’s Topology: Being, Place, World. Cambridge, MA: MIT Press, 2006. Rev. paperback edition, 2008. Translated in Italian, by Giulia Ballocca, as

=== Edited volumes ===
Malpas has edited (or co-edited) twenty-four volumes, including:

——— and Ingo Farin, eds. Heidegger and the Human. Albany, NY: SUNY Press, forthcoming 2022).

——— and Keith Jacobs, eds. Towards a Philosophy of the City. London: Rowman and Littlefield, 2019.

——— and Ingo Farin, eds. Reading Heidegger’s Black Notebooks, 1931–1941. Cambridge, MA: MIT Press, 2016.

———, ed. The Intelligence of Place: Topographies and Poetics. London: Bloomsbury, 2015.

———, ed. Dialogues with Davidson: New Perspectives on His Philosophy. Cambridge, MA: MIT Press, 2011.

=== Chapters in edited volumes ===
Malpas has authored (or co-authored) seventy-six chapters in edited volumes, including:

———. “Uprostorjenje oblikovanja: arhitektura v dobi tehnološkega kapitalizma—oblast, vertikalnost in ulica” [“The Spatialization of Design: Architecture in the Age of Technological Capitalism—Power, Verticality, and the Street”]. In O oblasti v arhitekturi [On Power in Architecture], Zbirka Transformacije, vol. 47, edited by Mateja Kurir, 99-112. Ljubljana: Maska, Društvo Igor Zabel za kulturo in teorijo, 2021.

———. “In the Presence of Things.” In After Discourse: Things, Affects, Ethics, edited by Bjørnar Olsen, Mats Burström, Caitlin DeSilvey, Þóra Pétursdóttir, 59-71. London: Routledge, 2020.

——— and Randall Lindstrom. “The Modesty of Architecture.” In Political Theory and Architecture, edited by Duncan Bell and Bernardo Zacka, 255-276. London: Bloomsbury, 2020.

———. “The House of Being: Poetry, Language, Place.” In Paths in Heidegger’s Later Thought, edited by Günter Figal, Diego D’Angelo, Tobias Keiling, and Guang Yang, 15-44. Bloomington, IN: Indiana University Press, 2020.

———. “Dying in a Liberal Society.” In Considering Religions, Rights, and Bioethics: For Max Charlesworth, edited by P. Wong, S. Bloor, P. Hutchings, and P. P. Bilimoria, 51-62. Dordrecht: Springer, 2019.

——— and Edward Casey. “A Phenomenology of Thinking in Place.” In Thinking in the World, edited by Jill Bennett and Mary Zournazi, 39-63. London: Bloomsbury, 2019.

———. “Taking Everything in Hand: Managerialism and Technology.” In The Rise of Managerialism, edited by Anna Yeatman, 21-42. London: Rowman and Littlefield, 2018.

———. “Governing Theory: Ontology, Methodology, and the Critique of Metaphysics.” In Rethinking Law, Society, and Governance: Foucault’s Bequest, edited by Gary Wickham, 125-140. Oxford, Hart Publishing, 2001.

=== Journal articles ===
Malpas has authored (or co-authored) seventy-eight journal articles, including:

———. “From Place to Territory.” Environment and Planning D: Society and Space: forthcoming 2022.

———. “Place and Philosophical Topography: Responding to Bubbio, Farin, and Satne.” International Journal of Philosophical Studies 28 (2020): 299–312.

———. “Spirit of Time/ Spirit of Place.” Journal of Continental Philosophy 1 (2020): 277-283. Originally published in Turkish as “Zamanın Ruhu/Yerin Ruhu,” Sabah Ülkesi [Quarterly Journal of Arts, Culture, and Philosophy] 58 (2019):36–39.

———. “Topologies of History.” History and Theory 58 (2019): 3–23.

———. “The Spatialization of the World: Technology, Modernity, and the Effacement of the Human.” Phainomena 27 (2018): 91–108.

———. “Five Theses on Place (and some associated remarks): A Reply to Peter Gratton.” Il Cannocchiale: rivista di studi filosofici 42 (2017): 69–81.

———. “Putting Space in Place: Relational Geography and Philosophical Topography.” Planning and Environment D: Space and Society 30 (2012): 226-242. Translated in Korean and reprinted in Space Theory and its Social Appropriation (2013): 15–53.

——— and Gary Wickham. “Democracy and Instrumentalism.” Australian Journal of Political Science 33 (1998): 345–362.

=== Other publications ===
In addition, Malpas has published review articles, encyclopaedia entries, electronic publications, magazine articles, conference proceedings, interviews, book forewords, reports, and book reviews, and has made other contributions via newspapers, radio, television, and online platforms.
