= Theodore Edward Dowling =

Theodore Edward Dowling (1837 – 1921), Archdeacon in Syria, was an Anglican priest and historian who studied the ancient eastern churches and wrote several scholarly works regarding the church history of Armenia, Antioch, the Eastern Orthodox Patriarchate of Jerusalem, and Georgia.

== Selected works ==
- Dies panis (Boston: H. Rowsell, 1867)
- The Abyssinian Church (London: Cope & Fenwick, 1909)
- The Egyptian Church (London: SPCK, 1909)
- The Patriarchate of Jerusalem (London: SPCK, 1909)
- The Armenian Church (London: SPCK, 1910)
- Sketches of Georgian Church History (London: SPCK / New York: E.S. Gorham, 1912)
- Gaza: A City of Many Battles (London: SPCK, 1913)
- The Orthodox Greek Patriarchate of Jerusalem (London: SPCK, 1913)
- Hellenism in England (London: Faith Press, 1915)

== See also ==
- Kartvelian studies
