= Samir Mansour Library =

Library and bookshop in Palestine

Coordinates: 31.3547°N 34.3087°E

The Samir Mansour Library is a library, bookshop, and publishing house in Gaza, Palestine. It is one of the first libraries in the region, and is one of the largest. It was destroyed in an Israeli airstrike in 2021, and rebuilt with fundraising from a GoFundMe campaign.

== Function ==
The library functions as a library, bookshop, and publishing house. It is the biggest library or bookshop in Gaza. It has books in both Arabic and English. The library is located near three universities, including the Islamic University of Gaza and is used by students. The publishing house focuses on Palestinian writers, with the books printed in Egypt.

== History ==
The library's owner, Samir Mansour, had worked with books since he was 15 in the 1980s, helping his father in his bookshop. Mansour started his own bookshop and publishing house started in 2000. It was called the Samir Mansour Bookshop, although it allowed visitors to read books in the shop "without any obligation to purchase". The original bookshop contained around 100,000 books.

=== Initial destruction ===
The Kuheil building, where the bookshop was housed since 2008, was destroyed in Israeli airstrikes in May 2021, along with the nearby Iqraa library and two other bookshops. Mansour was at home when he saw a warning on television that the building his bookshop was in was going to be destroyed. He ran to the shop, but stopped 200m away and saw Israeli planes fire two missiles at the building. The Israeli military said that the bookshop was not a target, but that the building the bookshop was in "contained a Hamas facility for producing weapons and intelligence-gathering."

=== Rebuilding efforts ===
A GoFundMe to rebuild the bookshop was started by human rights lawyers Mahvish Rukhsana and Clive Stafford Smith and managed by the non-profit organisation Reprieve. The campaign raised over US$200,000 for the rebuilding of the bookshop and over 10,000 books were donated. Books2Door, a UK children's bookseller, donated 1000 books to the library. Many people who donated books left messages and their email addresses in the books. Mansour's only request of those donating books was for Harry Potter books, saying they are very popular with children in Gaza. This led many people to donate boxsets of the series.

The owner, Mansour, reopened it as a bookshop and library with plans to build a Gaza Cultural Centre library next door. Seven months after the initial destruction, the library was 90% rebuilt. Nine months after initial destruction, the library was ultimately rebuilt to triple the size of the original building with a collection of 400,000 books. It was reopened on 17 February 2022.

=== Second bombing ===
In October 2023, the library was damaged in an Israeli airstrike, along with eight other publishing houses and libraries.

== Honours ==
In November 2021, the library was nominated for the International Publishers Association 2021 Prix Voltaire prize, which honours freedom to publish. In 2024, it was again nominated for the Prix Voltaire prize and won.
