= Al-Ghussein House =

House in Gaza, Palestine

Al-Gussein House
- بيت الغصين
- Interactive map of the Al-Gussein House area

General information
- Status: Destroyed
- Location: Daraj Quarter, Old City of Gaza, Gaza City, Gaza Strip, Palestine
- Coordinates: 31.505596°N 34.465806°E
- Year built: 1870-1917

The Al-Ghussein House was the former house of the Al-Ghussein family, located in the Old City of Gaza. The house is located in the Al-Daraj neighborhood, north of the Omari Mosque.

== History ==
The building was constructed sometime from 1870 to 1917 during the late period of Ottoman Palestine, housed the wealthy Al-Ghussein family. Later it housed the British consul's family during the British Mandate before being abandoned and falling into disrepair. In 2020, it was restored through a collaborative project between the Goethe-Institut, Riwaq, and Iwan. Following the restoration, it became a vibrant cultural center, hosting various events, such as film screenings, poetry evenings, music performances, workshops, and exhibits.

== Destruction ==
The house was destroyed by Israeli bombings in 2023 during the Israel-Gaza War. Hani Hayek, minister of Palestine Tourism and Antiquities, in a 2025 report of building damage in Gaza, listed the house under "Highly Damaged" due to two instances of bombing.

In tandem with accusations of genocide against the Palestinian people by the Israeli military during the offensive, human rights organization Euro-Med Monitor called the destruction of the house a deliberate attempt to destroy Palestinian culture and heritage, citing the bombings of the nearby Omari Mosque and the ancient port of Gaza as additional examples. Hayek similarly writes in his 2025 report: "The destruction of historic sites not only results in the loss of physical structures but also threatens the cultural identity, social fabric, and historical continuity of the Gaza Strip."
