= List of archaeological sites in Israel and Palestine =

This is a list of archaeological sites in Israel and Palestine.

== Chronological framework ==
The chronological periods are abbreviated in this way:

- Pa – Paleolithic
- EP – Epipalaeolithic
- Ne – Neolithic
- Ch – Chalcolithic
- EB – Early Bronze Age
- IB – Intermediate Bronze Age (also called "Early Bronze IV" and "Middle Bronze I")
- MB – Middle Bronze Age
- LB – Late Bronze Age
- IA – Iron Age
- Pe – Persian period (Achaemenid Empire)
- He – Hellenistic period
- Ro – Roman period
- By – Byzantine period
- EM – Early Muslim period (Rashidun, Umayyad, Abbasid, and Fatimid periods)
- Cr – Crusader period
- Ma – Mamluk period
- Ot – Ottoman period

== Northern District ==
Name	Alternative Name(s)	Pa	EP	Ne	Ch	EB	IB	MB	LB	IA	Pe	He	Ro	By	EM	Cr	Ma	Ot	Features and notes
Tel Abel Beth Maachah	Tell Abil el-Qameḥ					✓		✓	✓	✓	✓	✓	✓	✓	✓	✓			
Abu Zurayq	Tel Zariq	✓		✓	✓	✓		✓	✓	✓	✓	✓	✓	✓	✓	✓	✓	✓	
Achziv	Az-Zeeb, al-Zib, al-Zaib							✓	✓	✓			✓			✓		✓	
Ain Mallaha	Eynan		✓																
Tel Anafa	Tel el-Hader					✓		✓	✓	✓	✓	✓	✓						
Amud Cave		✓																	
Arbel	Khirbet Irbid													✓	✓		✓		
Banias	Caesarea Philippi									✓		✓	✓	✓	✓	✓	✓	✓	
Bar'am Synagogue											✓	✓	✓	✓				✓	
Beth Alpha	Bet Alpha, Bet Alfa												✓	✓					
Beit She'arim (Roman-era Jewish village)	Sheikh Abreik																		
Beit She'arim necropolis	Bet She'arāyim, Kfar She'arāyim									✓			✓	✓	✓	✓		✓	World Heritage Site
Bethsaida	et-Tell					✓				✓	✓	✓	✓				✓	✓	
Beit She'an	Scythopolis				✓	✓	✓	✓	✓	✓	✓	✓	✓	✓	✓	✓	✓	✓	
Belvoir Fortress	Kochav HaYarden												✓			✓			
Cabul	Chabolo, Chabulon										✓	✓	✓	✓		✓		✓	
Capernaum	Kfar Nahum													✓	✓				
Chorazin	Korazim											✓		✓					
Daughters of Jacob Bridge	Gesher Bnot Ya'akov, Jisr Benat Ya'kub	✓		✓												✓	✓	✓	
Tel Dan	Tell el-Qadi			✓	✓	✓	✓	✓	✓	✓	✓	✓	✓						Tel Dan Stele
Ed-Dikke synagogue														✓					
Dothan	Tel Dothan								✓	✓									
Ein el-Jarba	En Nahlaot			✓	✓	✓													
Gamla	Gamala, Al-Sunâm					✓						✓	✓						
Tell Hadar									✓	✓									
Hamat Gader						✓							✓	✓	✓				
Hamat Tiberias												✓	✓	✓	✓	✓	✓		
Tel Hanaton	Tal Badawiye							✓	✓	✓	✓	✓	✓			✓	✓	✓	
Har Senaim	Senaim												✓	✓			✓		
Tel Hazor	Hatzor, Tell el-Qedah					✓	✓	✓	✓	✓	✓	✓							Part of the 'Biblical Tels – Megiddo, Hazor, Beer Sheba' World Heritage Site
Tel Kabri	Tell al-Qahweh			✓	✓	✓		✓	✓	✓	✓	✓							
Jish	Gush Halav																		
Jubb Yussef	Joseph's Well																		
Jezreel	Zar'in			✓	✓	✓		✓		✓	✓	✓	✓	✓	✓	✓	✓	✓	
Hippos	Sussita											✓	✓	✓					
Hurvat Amudim	Sde Amudim																		
Huqoq	Hucuca																		
Horbat 'Uza				✓	✓	✓	✓		✓		✓	✓	✓	✓	✓	✓			
Kfar Giladi																			
Kfar HaHoresh																			
Kafr 'Inan																			
Khirbet Kerak	Beth Yerah					✓						✓	✓	✓	✓				
Khirbet Qana																			
Katzrin ancient village and synagogue																			
Legio																			
Khirbet Sharta																			
Kursi, Golan Heights																			
Magdala	Migdal																		Migdal Synagogue, Magdala stone
Maoz Haim Synagogue																			
Manot Cave																			
Mary's Well																			
Tel Megiddo	Tell al-Mutesellim			✓	✓	✓	✓	✓	✓	✓	✓								Part of the 'Biblical Tels – Megiddo, Hazor, Beer Sheba' World Heritage Site
Megiddo church																			
Montfort Castle																			
Mujahia	Nab‘a el-Mjảḥiyye																		
Nabratein synagogue																			
Nahal Tut																			
Nahal Amud																			Amud 1
Nimrod Fortress																			
Ohalo																			
Omrit	Horbat Omrit																		
Peki'in Synagogue																			
Tel Qashish	Tell el-Qassis			✓	✓	✓		✓	✓	✓	✓	✓							
Tel Qiri				✓	✓	✓	✓	✓	✓	✓	✓	✓	✓	✓	✓	✓		✓	
Tel Rehov																			Mosaic of Rehob
Tel Rekhesh (Nahal Tavor valley)	Tell el-Mukharkhash					✓		✓	✓	✓	✓		✓	✓	✓				
Tel Rosh	Khirbet Tell ‘er-Ruwesah					✓		✓	✓	✓	✓	✓	✓	✓	✓	✓	✓	✓	
Rujm el-Hiri																			
Safed																			
Sde Nahum																			
Ancient Synagogue of Shfaram																			
Sha'ar HaGolan																			Type-site of the Yarmukian culture
Tel Shem	Tell esh Shammam			✓	✓	✓		✓	✓	✓	✓	✓	✓	✓			✓	✓	
Shikhin	Asochis																		
Tel Shimron																			
Tel Shor	Tel Tora								✓	✓	✓	✓	✓	✓	✓	✓	✓	✓	
Al-Sinnabra																			
Sepphoris	Tzipori, Diocaesaraea								✓	✓	✓	✓	✓	✓	✓	✓	✓	✓	Tzippori Synagogue
Ubeidiya	Tel Ubeidiya	✓					✓			✓	✓	✓	✓		✓	✓	✓	✓	
Umm el-Qanatir	Ein Keshatot											✓	✓	✓			✓		
Yehudiya						✓						✓	✓	✓	✓		✓		
Yiftahel	Khirbat Haladiyah			✓	✓	✓				✓			✓						
Yodfat	Jotapata											✓	✓	✓					
Tel Yokneam	Tel Qamun, Caymont				✓	✓		✓	✓	✓	✓	✓	✓	✓	✓	✓	✓	✓	

== Haifa District ==
Name	Alternative Name(s)	Pa	EP	Ne	Ch	EB	IB	MB	LB	IA	Pe	He	Ro	By	EM	Cr	Ma	Ot	Features and notes
Tell Abu Hawam								✓	✓	✓	✓	✓	✓		✓				
Tel Acre	Tell el-Fukhar							✓	✓	✓	✓	✓							World Heritage Site, 'Old City of Acre'
Tel Afek	Tell Kurdana							✓	✓	✓	✓	✓	✓		✓	✓			
Ahwat	El-Ahwat									✓			✓						
Tel Burga	Khirbet al-Bureij	✓			✓	✓	✓	✓		✓	✓	✓	✓	✓	✓				
Caesarea Maritima	Caesarea Palestinae									✓		✓	✓	✓	✓	✓	✓	✓	Birds Mosaic, Pilate stone
Château Pèlerin	Atlit fortress, Castle Pilgrim										✓	✓	✓	✓		✓			Located within a closed military area of the Atlit naval base.
En Esur	Ein el-Asawir			✓	✓				✓					✓				✓	
Kebara Cave		✓	✓			✓													Kebara 2
Kafr Kanna																			
Kafr Yasif																			
Khirbat al-Minya	Ayn Minyat Hisham, Hurvat Minim																		
Khirbat Al-Burj	Burj Binyamina																		
Tel Mevorakh	Tall al-Mubarak																		
Misliya cave	Brotzen Cave																		
Neve David																			
Nahal Me'arot	Wadi el-Mughara																		World Heritage Site
Ramat HaNadiv	Umm el-'Aleq																		
Tel Shush																			
Es Skhul	Skhul Cave	✓																	
Tabun Cave		✓																	
Tel Shikmona	Tell as-Samakh							✓	✓	✓	✓	✓	✓	✓	✓				
Tel Zomera									✓	✓	✓	✓	✓	✓	✓			✓	

== Central District ==
Name	Alternative Name(s)	Pa	EP	Ne	Ch	EB	IB	MB	LB	IA	Pe	He	Ro	By	EM	Cr	Ma	Ot	Features and notes
Antipatris	Tel Afek, Kŭlảt Râs el ’Ain				✓	✓	✓	✓	✓	✓		✓	✓	✓	✓			✓	
Gezer	Tel Gezer				✓	✓		✓	✓	✓	✓	✓	✓	✓	✓	✓	✓	✓	
Kfar Monash																			Kfar Monash Hoard
Lod	Lyyda			✓	✓	✓	✓	✓	✓	✓	✓	✓	✓	✓	✓	✓	✓	✓	Lod Mosaic
Mazor Mausoleum																			
Mesad Hashavyahu																			
Qesem cave		✓																	
White Mosque																			
Tomb of Benjamin																			
Yavne-Yam	Minet Rubin							✓	✓	✓	✓	✓	✓	✓	✓		✓		
Yavne	Ibelin, Tel Yavne							✓	✓	✓	✓	✓	✓	✓	✓	✓	✓	✓	

== Tel Aviv District ==
Name	Alternative Name(s)	Pa	EP	Ne	Ch	EB	IB	MB	LB	IA	Pe	He	Ro	By	EM	Cr	Ma	Ot	Features and notes
Apollonia-Arsuf	Arsur				✓					✓	✓	✓	✓	✓	✓	✓			
Tel Gerisa	Tell Jerishe, Tell Jarisha, Napoleon's Hill					✓		✓	✓	✓					✓				
Tel Hashash													✓	✓					
Jaffa	Yafo, Yaffa, Japho, Joppa							✓	✓	✓	✓	✓	✓	✓	✓	✓	✓	✓	
Tel Michal								✓	✓	✓	✓	✓	✓		✓				
Khirbat el-‘Ora														✓	✓	✓			
Tell Qasile										✓									
Tell Qudadi											✓	✓	✓						
Tel Zeton	Tell Abu Zeitun							✓		✓	✓		✓	✓	✓	✓	✓		

== Jerusalem ==
Incorporates Jerusalem Municipality, including both West and East Jerusalem.

Name	Alternative Name(s)	Pa	EP	Ne	Ch	EB	IB	MB	LB	IA	Pe	He	Ro	By	EM	Cr	Ma	Ot	Features and notes
Cave of the Minor Sanhedrin													✓						
Cave of Nicanor													✓						
Givati Parking Lot dig																			
Huldah Gates																			
Israelite Tower																			
Jason's Tomb																			
Temple Mount	Har HaBayit, Haram esh-Sharif, Al Aqsa Compound																		King Hezekiah bulla, Ophel Treasure, Ophel inscription
Western Wall Tunnel																			
City of David	Wadi Hilweh									✓									
Pool of Bethesda																			
Southern Wall																			Trumpeting Place inscription
Jerusalem pilgrim road																			
Monastery of the Virgins														✓					
Monolith of Silwan	Tomb of Pharaoh's Daughter																		
Peace Forest																			Caiaphas ossuary
Ramat Rachel																			
Scopus stone vessels cave													✓						
Sheikh Badr																			
Shuafat																			
Silwan	Kfar HaShiloah																		Silwan necropolis
Al-Marwani Mosque	Solomon's Stables																		
Tabachnik Garden																			
Talpiot Tomb																			
Tomb of Absalom	Absalom's Pillar																		
Tomb of Benei Hezir																			
Tombs of the Kings																			
Tomb of the Prophets																			
Tombs of the Sanhedrin																			
Tomb of Zechariah													✓	✓					
Tower of David	Jerusalem Citadel																		
Khirbet Umm Leisun															✓				Umm Leisun inscription

== Jerusalem District ==
Name	Alternative Name(s)	Pa	EP	Ne	Ch	EB	IB	MB	LB	IA	Pe	He	Ro	By	EM	Cr	Ma	Ot	Features and notes
Adullam	Eîd el Mieh, Khirbet ‘Id el-Minya																		
Tel Azekah						✓	✓	✓	✓	✓	✓	✓	✓	✓					
Ein Hemed	Aqua Bella																		
Ekron	Tel Miqne, Khirbet el-Muqanna, Accaron				✓	✓		✓	✓	✓			✓	✓	✓				Ekron Royal Dedicatory Inscription
Horvat 'Ethri	Umm Suweid																		
Tell ej-Judeideh						✓	✓			✓		✓	✓	✓					
Khirbet Qeiyafa	Elah Fortress							✓		✓	✓	✓	✓	✓					
Khirbat Umm Burj																			
Khirbet et-Tibbaneh	Timnah of Judah																		
Sataf					✓	✓						✓	✓				✓	✓	
Sokho																			
Suba	Soba, Sobetha, Zova, Tel Tzova, Jabal Suba																		
Timnah	Tel Batash							✓	✓	✓	✓								

== West Bank ==
Name	Alternative Name(s)	Pa	EP	Ne	Ch	EB	IB	MB	LB	IA	Pe	He	Ro	By	EM	Cr	Ma	Ot	Features and notes
Alexandrium	Alexandrium, Sartaba, Qarn Sartabe											✓							
Tell Balata	Shechem				✓	✓		✓	✓	✓	✓	✓							
Betar	Khirbet al-Yahud									✓	✓	✓	✓	✓					
Byzantine Church of Khirbet et-Tireh														✓	✓				
Ein Feshkha	Enot Zukim											✓	✓	✓					
El Khiam		✓	✓	✓															Type-site of the Khiamian culture
Emmaus Nicopolis	Emmaus											✓	✓	✓	✓	✓		✓	
Et-Tell	Ai					✓				✓									
Eshtemoa synagogue										✓			✓	✓	✓				
Tell el-Far'ah (North)	Tirzah			✓	✓	✓		✓	✓	✓	✓	✓	✓	✓		✓	✓		
Galgala																			
Gibeon	Giv'on						✓	✓	✓	✓			✓						
Gilgal I				✓															
Tell el Hammeh								✓		✓	✓				✓				
Hasmonean royal winter palaces	Tulul Abu al-'Alayiq																		Wadi Qelt Synagogue
Hebron	Al-Khalil																		A World Heritage Site
Herodium	Herodeion																		
Horvat Maon	Khirbet Maʿin, Tell Maʿin																		
Hyrcania	Khirbet el-Mird, Kastellion											✓	✓	✓					
Hisham's Palace	Qaṣr Hishām, Khirbat al-Mafjar														✓				Tentative World Heritage candidate site.
Jericho synagogue																			
Khirbet Ibziq	Bezek																		
Khirbet Kefireh																			
Khirbet el-Maqatir								✓	✓	✓			✓	✓	✓				
Khirbet Mazin	Metzad Kidron																		
Khirbet el-Qom						✓	✓	✓		✓		✓							
Khirbet Tibnah																			
Khirbat Khudash										✓			✓	✓				✓	
Khirbat ash-Shajara										✓									
Laura of Euthymius																			
Mamre	Ramat el-Khalil																		
Mount Gerizim	Har Grizim; Jebel et-Tor											✓	✓	✓	✓				Sacred mountain of the Samaritans.Tentative World Heritage candidate site.
Monastery of Martyrius														✓					
Naaran																			
Tell en-Nasbeh	Mizpeh				✓	✓				✓	✓		✓	✓					Jaazaniah
Netiv HaGdud																			
Phasael tower	Hippicus Tower																		
Qubur Bani Isra'il																			
Qumran	Khirbet Qumran																		
Qumran Caves													✓						Tentative World Heritage candidate site.
Tel Rumeida	Jabla al-Rahama								✓										
Sebastia	Samaria, Shomron																		
Shemouniyeh	Wadi al-Far'a																		
Tell es-Sultan	Tel Jericho				✓				✓	✓									Tower of Jericho, Wall of Jericho. A World Heritage Site
Shuqba Cave																			Type-site of the Natufian culture
Solomon's Pools																			
Susya														✓	✓	✓			
Ti'inik	Taanach					✓		✓	✓	✓	✓				✓			✓	
Tomb of Joshua																			
Tomb of Samuel	Nebi Samwil																		
Tel Shiloh	Khirbet Seilun							✓	✓	✓	✓	✓	✓	✓	✓			✓	
Wadi Daliyeh							✓				✓	✓							Mughâret Abū Shinjeh and Iraq en-Na'sana caves
Wadi Tahuna																			Type-site of the Tahunian culture

== Gaza Strip ==
Name	Alternative Name(s)	Pa	EP	Ne	Ch	EB	IB	MB	LB	IA	Pe	He	Ro	By	EM	Cr	Ma	Ot	Features and notes
Tell el-Ajjul							✓	✓	✓	✓		✓	✓				✓	✓	Tell el-Ajjul gold hoards
Tell Ali Muntar	Tell Muntar, Tell Al-Muntar							✓											
Anthedon	Al-Balakhiyya; Anthedon Harbour											✓	✓	✓					Proposed as a Tentative World Heritage Site in 2012
Ard-al-Moharbeen necropolis													✓						
Barquq Castle																	✓	✓	
Blakhiya Byzantine cemetery														✓					Possibly connected to Anthedon
Byzantine Church of Jabalia														✓					Proposed as a Tentative World Heritage Site in 2026
Deir el-Balah Bronze Age cemetery									✓										Deir el-Balah sarcophagi
Gaza synagogue														✓	✓				
al-Moghraqa								✓											Possible satellite settlement of Tell el-Ajjul
Monastery of Seridus														✓					
Tell Ruqeish	Tell er-Ruqeish; Tell Ruqaish									✓	✓								
Al-Saqqa House																		✓	
Tell es-Sakan						✓													
Tell es-Sanam									✓	✓									
Saint Hilarion Monastery/Tell Umm Amer														✓	✓				A World Heritage Site
Taur Ikhbeineh					✓	✓													
Zofor Domri Mosque	Al-Qazmari Mosque																✓	✓	

== Southern District ==
Name	Alternative Name(s)	Pa	EP	Ne	Ch	EB	IB	MB	LB	IA	Pe	He	Ro	By	EM	Cr	Ma	Ot	Features and notes
Horvat 'Anim													✓	✓					
Tel Arad					✓	✓				✓	✓	✓	✓		✓				Arad ostraca
Ashdod	Tel Ashdod				✓	✓		✓	✓	✓	✓	✓	✓	✓					
Ashdod-Yam									✓	✓			✓	✓	✓	✓			
Ascalon	Tel Ashkelon			✓	✓	✓		✓	✓	✓	✓	✓	✓	✓	✓	✓	✓	✓	Ashkelon dog cemetery
Avdat	Abdah, Ovdat, Obodat												✓	✓					
Tel Be'er Sheva	Tell es-Seba				✓					✓	✓	✓	✓		✓				Part of the 'Biblical Tels – Megiddo, Hazor, Beer Sheba' World Heritage Site
Beit Guvrin	Bayt Jibrin, Eleutheropolis												✓	✓	✓	✓	✓	✓	Part of the 'Caves of Maresha and Bet-Guvrin in the Judean Lowlands as a Microcosm of the Land of the Caves' World Heritage Site
Tell Beit Mirsim						✓	✓	✓	✓	✓									
Bir Abu Matar	Khirbet Abu Matar	✓			✓														
Cave of Horror	Cave 8												✓						
Cave of Letters					✓								✓						
Ein HaBesor													✓	✓	✓				
Ein Bokek	Metzad Bokek										✓	✓	✓	✓					
Ein Gedi					✓					✓	✓	✓	✓	✓					Chalcolithic Temple of Ein Gedi
Tel Erani	Tell esh-Sheikh Ahmed el-ʿAreini				✓	✓			✓	✓	✓	✓							
Tell el-Far'ah (South)								✓	✓	✓	✓			✓	✓			✓	
Gath	Tell es-Safi, Tel Tzafit	✓ ?		✓ ?	✓	✓	✓	✓	✓	✓	✓	✓	✓	✓	✓	✓	✓	✓	
Hatula				✓															
Haluza	Halasa, Chellous																		
Tell el-Hesi																			
Horvat Uza										✓		✓	✓						
Ir Ovot																			
Khirbet Beit Lei	Beth Loya									✓		✓	✓	✓	✓		✓		
Tel Lachish				✓	✓	✓	✓	✓	✓	✓	✓	✓	✓						
Lotz Cisterns	Borot Loz																		
Maon Synagogue																			
Mampsis	Mamshit, Memphis																		
Maresha										✓									Part of the 'Caves of Maresha and Bet-Guvrin in the Judean Lowlands as a Microcosm of the Land of the Caves' World Heritage Site
Masada																			World Heritage Site
Minat al-Qal'a																			
Nahal Hemar																			
Nahal Issaron																			
Nitzana																			
Shivta																			
Timna Valley																			
Tel Zayit	Tell Zeita, Kirbat Zeita al Kharab							✓	✓	✓	✓	✓	✓	✓	✓	✓	✓	✓	

== See also ==
- List of archaeological excavations in Jerusalem
- List of biblical places
- Levantine archaeology
- Politics of archaeology in Israel and Palestine
