= Moain Sadeq =

Palestinian-Canadian archaeologist

- معين صادق
- Born: Khan Yunis, Palestine
- Citizenship: Palestinian-Canadian
- Occupations: Archaeologist; University lecturer

Academic background
- Education: Cairo University (BA); Free University of Berlin (PhD)
- Thesis: Die mamlukische Architektur der Stadt Gaza (1991)

Academic work
- Discipline: Archaeology
- Sub-discipline: Islamic archaeology
- Institutions: Department of Antiquities of Gaza; Qatar University

Moain Sadeq (Arabic: معين صادق) is a Palestinian-Canadian archaeologist specialising in the archaeology of Gaza. He teaches at Qatar University and has worked at colleges in Canada. After completing a doctorate at the Free University of Berlin, Sadeq co-founded the Faculty of Education in Gaza, which later became Al-Aqsa University. In 1994, Sadeq co-founded the Department of Antiquities of Gaza. While working at the department, Sadeq jointly led excavations at Tell es-Sakan and Tell el-‘Ajjul.

== Early life and education ==
Sadeq was born in Khan Yunis in Palestine. Sadeq graduated from Cairo University in 1979 with a Bachelor of Arts in Islamic archaeology. He then studied at the Free University of Berlin, completing a doctorate in Islamic history and archaeology.

== Career ==
With support from fellow archaeologist Klaus Brisch and funding from the Deutschen Akademischen Austauschdienst, Sadeq developed his doctoral thesis into a book, published by Klaus Schwarz Verlag in 1991. Die mamlukische Architektur der Stadt Gaza was a survey of Islamic architecture in Gaza. Also in 1991 Sadeq co-founded the Faculty of Education in Gaza, which later became Al-Aqsa University.

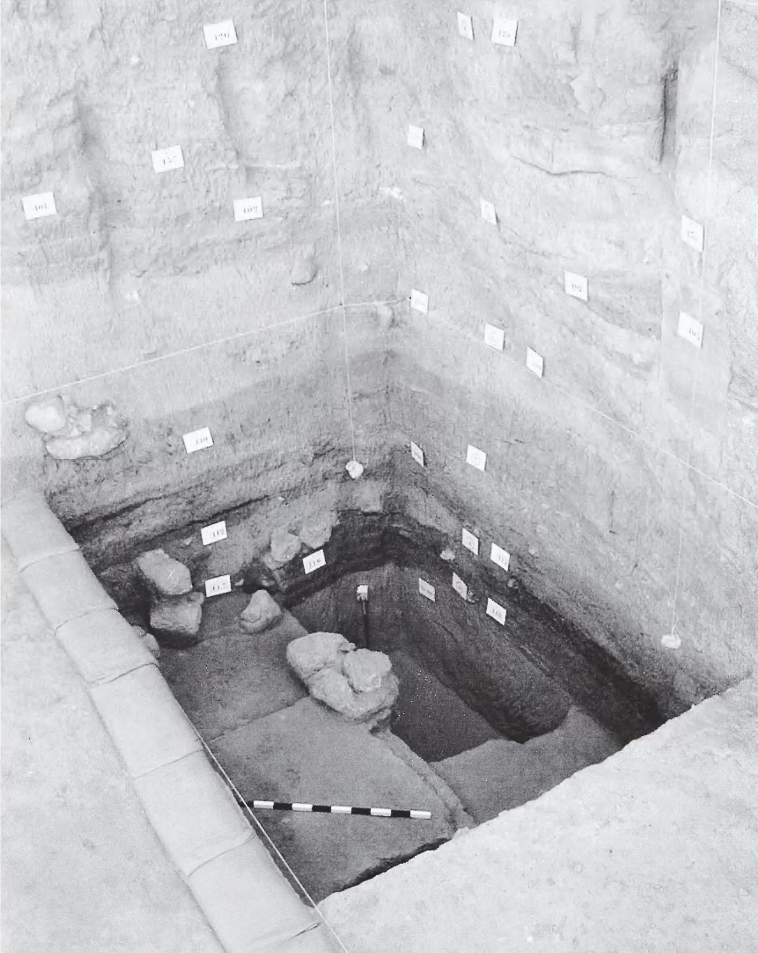
Part of the trial excavations under Sadeq's direction at Tell es-Sakan in 1999

The Palestinian National Authority established the Department of Antiquities in 1994 with responsibility for managing Palestine's cultural heritage sites. Sadeq was one of the founders of the department's Gaza branch, and is an expert on Gaza's archaeology. In his role as Director of the Department of Antiquities in Gaza, Sadeq was involved in a number of archaeological projects, such as the Gaza Research Project which began in 1996 and was led by Louise Steel, Joanne Clarke, and Sadeq. The project searched for evidence of archaeological remains dating to the Bronze Age in the region. Sadeq discovered a Bronze Age site in 1996, al-Moghraqa, which became one of the foci of the Gaza Research Project and underwent excavation. In 1999, Sadeq and Peter Fischer led excavations at Tell el-‘Ajjul which was last excavated in the 1930s. Along with Hamdan Taha, the head of the Department of Antiquities, Sadeq was involved with negotiations with Israel about the return of artefacts excavated in Palestine during the Israeli occupation.

Building projects in Gaza led to the discovery of new archaeological sites such as Tell es-Sakan, a Bronze Age fortified settlement discovered in 1998 where Sadeq led archaeological investigations with Pierre de Miroschedji between 1999 and 2000. The site began as an Egyptian settlement before it was abandoned and reinhabited by the Canaanites; Tell es-Sakan is the oldest known Egyptian fortification to have been excavated.

With archaeological fieldwork in Gaza impractical due to conflict with Israel, and a diminishing budget for excavations after Hamas came to power, Sadeq left Gaza with his family in 2007. He moved to Canada where, through the Scholars at Risk project, he worked at Massey College and the Royal Ontario Museum. In 2010, Sadeq was a visiting professor at the Institute for Global Citizenship at Centennial College in Canada. In August that year, Sadeq took up a position teaching archaeology at Qatar University.

== Selected publications ==
=== Books ===
- Sadeq, Moain (1991). Die mamlukische Architektur der Stadt Gaza (in German). Klaus Schwarz Verlag. doi:10.1515/9783112400968. ISBN 978-3-11-240096-8.

=== Articles and chapters ===
- Humbert, Jean-Baptiste; Sadeq, Moain (2000). "Fouilles de Blakhiyah-Anthédon". In Humbert, Jean-Baptiste (ed.). Gaza Méditerranéenne: Histoire et archéologie en Palestine (in French). Éditions Errance. pp. 105–120.
- de Miroschedji, Pierre; Sadeq, Moain; Faltings, Dina; Boulez, Virginie; Naggiar-Moliner, Laurence; Sykes, Naomi; Tengberg, Margareta (2001), "Les fouilles de Tell es-Sakan (Gaza): nouvelles données sur les contacts égypto-cananéens aux IVe-IIIe millénaires", Paléorient (in French), 27 (2): 75–104, doi:10.3406/paleo.2001.4732
- Steel, Louise; Clarke, Joanne; Sadeq, Moain; Manley, Bill; McCarthy, Andrew; Munro, R. Neil (2004), "Gaza Research Project. Report on the 1999 and 2000 seasons at al-Moghraqa", Levant, 36: 37–88, doi:10.1179/lev.2004.36.1.37
- Steel, Louise; Manley, Bill; Clarke, Joanne; Sadeq, Moain (2004). "Egyptian 'Funerary Cones' from El-Moghraqa, Gaza". The Antiquaries Journal. 84: 319–333. doi:10.1017/S0003581500045856.
- Fischer, P. M.; Sadeq, Moain (2004). "Tell el-'Ajjul 2000: Second Season Preliminary Report". Ägypten und Levante. 12: 109–154. doi:10.1553/AEundL12s109.
- de Miroschedji, Pierre; Sadeq, Moain (2005). "The frontier of Egypt in the Early Bronze Age: preliminary soundings at Tell es-Sakan (Gaza Strip)". In Clarke, Joanne (ed.). Archaeological Perspectives on the Transmission and Transformation of Culture in the Eastern Mediterranean. Council for British Research in the Levant. pp. 155–169. ISBN 978-1-84217-168-4. JSTOR j.ctv310vqks.24.
- Nabulsi, Abdalla J.; Humbert, Jean-Baptiste; Said, Ahmad; Sadeq, M. Moain (2010), "Excavation at the Blakhiya Byzantine cemetery in Gaza, 1996", Revue Biblique, 117 (4): 602–613, JSTOR 44091319
- Sadeq, Moain (2014). "An Overview of Iron Age Gaza in Light of the Archaeological Evidence". In Spencer, John R.; Mullins, Robert A.; Brody, Aaron J. (eds.). Material Culture Matters: Essays on the Archaeology of the Southern Levant in Honor of Seymour Gitin. Penn State University Press. pp. 239–254. doi:10.1515/9781575068787-019.
