= Tell el-Ajjul =

Archaeological site in Gaza Strip, Palestine

- تل العجول (Arabic)
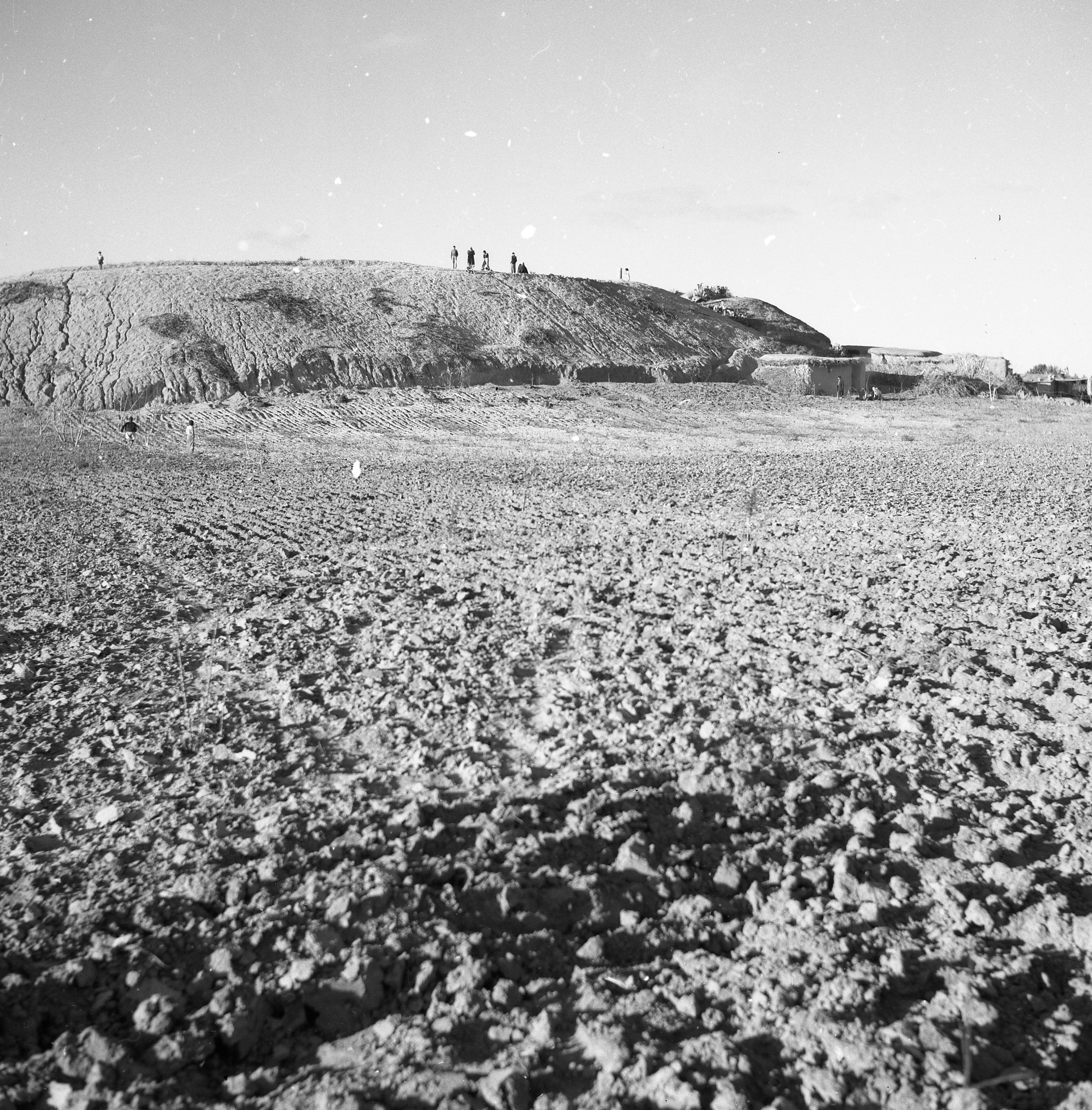
- Tell el-Ajjul in 1954

- Location within State of Palestine
- 31.4677°N 34.4043°E
- Type: Settlement
- Periods: Bronze Age
- Location: Palestine
- Region: Gaza Strip

Site notes
- Area: 11 to 13 hectares (27 to 32 acres)
- Excavation dates: 1930–1934; 1999–2000
- Archaeologists: Flinders Petrie; Peter M. Fischer; Moain Sadeq
- Condition: Damaged

Tall al-Ajjul or Tell el-'Ajul (Arabic: تل العجول, lit. 'mound of the calf') is an archaeological mound or tell in the Gaza Strip. The fortified city excavated at the site dates as far back as ca. 2000–1800 BCE and was inhabited during the Bronze Age. It is located at the mouth of Wadi Ghazzah just south of the city of Gaza. Tell el-Ajjul was likely established as a replacement for the nearby settlement of Tell es-Sakan, and in turn replaced by Tell es-Sanam. The nearby contemporary settlement of al-Moghraqa may have functioned as a satellite of Tell el-Ajjul.

The tell measured around 11 to 13 hectares (27 to 32 acres) in the 1930s when it was first excavated. The early excavation discovered three gold hoards which are now in the collections of the British Museum and the Rockefeller Museum. Archaeologists again conducted fieldwork at Tell el-Ajjul in 1999 and 2000. In the intervening period, farming practices had eroded part of the archaeological site. Tell el-Ajjul was one of many heritage sites that were damaged during the Israeli invasion of the Gaza Strip in 2023–25.

== Location ==
Tell el-Ajjul is about 1.8 kilometres (1.1 mi) inland from the modern coastline. It is close to the main land route between ancient Egypt and the Levant. The tell's full extent is uncertain, and by 2000 it covered an area of about 10 hectares (25 acres) as parts of the site had been levelled for farming. Estimates in the 1930s suggested the site covered about 11 to 13 hectares (27 to 32 acres). The name means 'the mound of the calf'.

== History ==
Archaeologists have excavated remains dated mainly to the Middle and Late Bronze Age.

=== Middle Bronze ===
Tell el-Ajjul was established about 500 metres (1,600 ft) south of Tell es-Sakan, which was abandoned in the 23rd century BCE. Archaeologists Pierre de Miroschedji and Moain Sadeq suggest that Tell el-Ajjul was established as a successor settlement to Tell es-Sakan.

==== Middle Bronze II ====
In the MBIIA, Tell el-Ajjul was an important city in the Southern Levant.

In the MB IIB, the population increased and many sites developed in the southern Levant. Tell el-Ajjul had the largest number of Egyptian Second Intermediate Period imports.

The settlement of al-Moghraqa was less than 1 kilometre (0.62 mi) from Tell el-Ajjul and was active in the Middle Bronze Age; it may have functioned as a satellite settlement of Tell el-Ajjul.

=== Late Bronze ===
Large quantities of pumice were deposited during the Late Bronze Age, which may have been caused by the Thera (Santorini) volcanic eruption. This was further investigated by the Austrian-Swedish archaeologist Peter M. Fischer, and this proved to be a good correlation and dating tool. Some samples of Chocolate-on-white ware were identified from the horizons dating to 1640–1410 BCE. Also, some connections with Tell el-Dab'a in Egypt were found.

The settlement of Tell es-Sanam was established further downstream of the Wadi Ghazzah; archaeologists Joanna Clarke and Louise Steel suggest that it may have been intended as a replacement to Tell el-Ajjul as the wadi silted up.

=== Treaty of Tell Ajul (1229) ===
The Sixth Crusade came to an end with the so-called Treaty of Jaffa and Tell Ajul. These were in fact two different treaties, the first being the one signed at Tell Ajul by the competing Ayyubid rulers of Egypt, Syria and various smaller principalities. This treaty settled their territorial disputes and left Sultan Al-Kamil of Egypt in a very powerful position. The follow-up treaty was signed at Jaffa by Al-Kamil and the leader of the Sixth Crusade, Emperor Frederick II, thus removing the threat posed to Al-Kamil by the European armies.

== Identification ==
Ajjul is one of the proposed sites for Sharuhen and for Beth Eglaim mentioned in Eusebius's Onomasticon, in contrast with Petrie's initial identification with ancient Gaza. Eusebius placed Beth Eglaim at eight Roman miles from Gaza. The name is absent from the Bible, and is given by Eusebius in Greek as Bethaglaim.

In the 1970s, the archaeologist Aharon Kempinski proposed identifying Tell el-Ajjul with Sharuhen, the last stronghold of the Hyksos c. 1550 BCE.

== Investigations ==
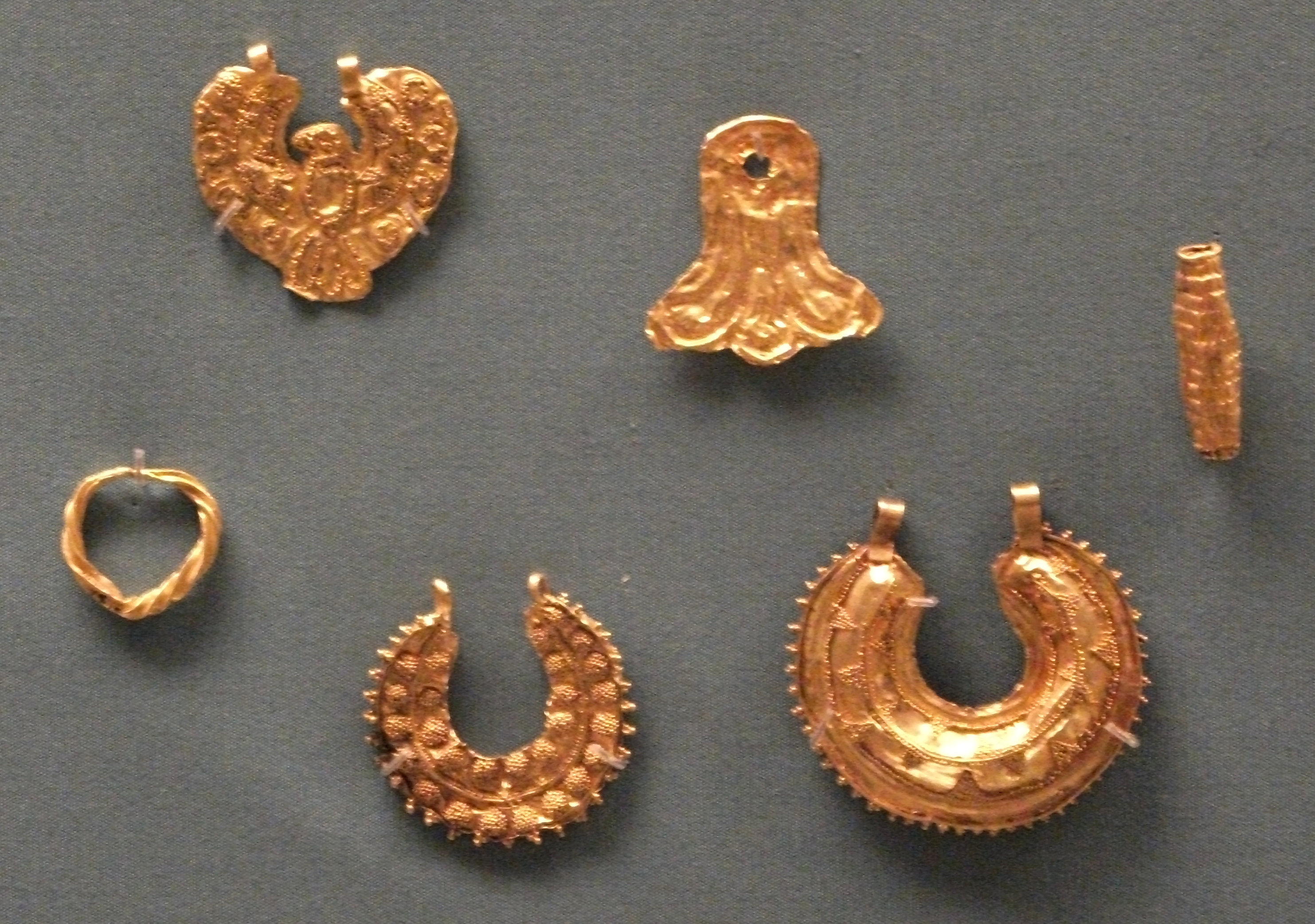
Artefacts from the gold hoards on display at the British Museum

It is estimated that less than 5% of the site has been excavated. In 1930–1934 Tell el-Ajjul was excavated by British archaeologists under the direction of Sir Flinders Petrie, who thought the site was ancient Gaza. He was accompanied by Olga Tufnell. Amongst Flinders Petrie's discoveries were three hoards of Bronze Age gold jewellery, considered to be among the greatest Bronze Age finds in the Levant. Scarab seals of the Egyptian pharaohs Apepi, Sheshi, Sekhaenre and 'Ammu were also uncovered. Most of the collection is preserved at the British Museum in London and the Rockefeller Museum in Jerusalem.

Plans for new investigations at Tell el-Ajjul began to be developed in 1998 as a joint collaboration between the recently formed Department of Antiquities of Palestine and the University of Gothenburg in Sweden. The department was established in 1994 and the work at Tell el-Ajjul was one of several international collaborations as the Palestinian people took on a greater role in fieldwork in the country. In 1999 and 2000 the archaeological fieldwork was led by Peter M. Fischer and Moain Sadeq because of a common interest in the protection and exploration of the site. The work was interrupted due to the outbreak of the Second Intifada.

A large amount of imported pottery from Cyprus has been discovered. These imports begin with Base-ring I, and White Slip I types of pottery. In particular, over 200 sherds of White Slip I have been found, which pottery is rarely found outside of Cyprus. The majority of the sherds, nevertheless, are of the later White Slip II and Base-ring II wares. There are also sherds of other kinds of Cypriot pottery, including Bichrome Wheel-made, Monochrome, Red Lustrous Wheel-made, and White Painted V/VI. Mycenean pottery and such from Upper Egypt were also found.

== Conservation ==
A krater from Tell el-Ajjul was part of the 2025 exhibition Saved Treasures of Gaza: 5000 Years of History

A combination of erosion and human intervention in the form of bulldozing have left the tell smaller than it was in the first half of the 20th century. After the conclusion of excavations at Tell el-Ajjul in the early 21st century the site was buried and adapted to agriculture. The area underwent significant landscapes changes with clearances in the 2000s followed by the construction of new buildings nearby and infrastructure such as roads. Around the time of the 2014 Gaza War, craters and buildings demolitions were recorded at Tell el-Ajjul and in its vicinity through aerial photography. Though thousands of artefacts have been discovered at from Tell el-Ajjul, evidencing that the settlement was "an extremely rich and important trade hub", the finds were moved to other countries.

During the Israeli invasion of the Gaza Strip, hundreds of hundreds of cultural heritage sites in Gaza were damaged or destroyed. UNESCO began a damage assessment and included Tell el-Ajjul amongst the sites that were damaged during the conflict, and a report by the Centre for Cultural Heritage Preservation published in January 2025 reported that Tell el-Ajjul had been damaged by bulldozing and bombing.

== See also ==
- En Besor – an Egyptian settlement east of Tell el-Ajjul
- List of archaeological sites in the Gaza Strip

== Bibliography ==
=== Early Descriptions ===
- Guérin, Victor (1869). Description Géographique Historique et Archéologique de la Palestine. Vol. 1: Judee, pt. 2. Paris, L'Imprimerie Imp. (visit in 1863: p. 212 )

=== Excavation Reports ===
- Petrie, William Flinders (1931). Ancient Gaza I. London: British School of Archaeology in Egypt, University College.
- Petrie, William Flinders (1932). Ancient Gaza II. London: British School of Archaeology in Egypt, University College.
- Petrie, William Flinders (1933). Ancient Gaza III. London: British School of Archaeology in Egypt, University College.
- Petrie, William Flinders (1934). Ancient Gaza IV. London: British School of Archaeology in Egypt, University College.
- Murray, Margaret A. (1934). Tell El Ajjul Drawings books 1933/34. Doc. no. SRF_187a (278/278). Israel Antiquities Authority Scientific Archive, British Mandatory Collection.
- Petrie, William Flinders; Mackay, Ernest J. H .; Murray, Margaret A. (1952). City of Shepherd Kings and Ancient Gaza V. London: British School of Egypitan Archaeology, University College.
- Fischer, Peter M.; Sadeq, Moain (1999). "Tell el-ʿAjjul 1999. A Joint Palestinian-Swedish Field Project: First Season Preliminary Report". Ägypten und Levant. X: 221–226. JSTOR 23783495.
- Fischer, Peter M.; Sadeq, Moain (2002). "Tell el-ʿAjjul 2000: Second Season Preliminary Report, with contributions by Anne Lykke, Rainer Feldbacher, Michael Weigl and Christa Mlinar". Ägypten und Levant. XII.
- Fischer, Peter M. (2003). "The Preliminary Chronology of Tell El-ʿAjjul: Results of the Renewed Excavations in 1999 and 2000". In Bietak, Manfred (ed.). The Synchronization of Civilizations in the Second Millenium B.C. II: Proceedings of the SCIEM 2000 — EuroConference, Haindorf 2nd of May - 7th of May 2001. Wien: Österreichischen Akademie der Wissenschaften. pp. 263–294.

=== Subsequent Archaeological Studies ===
- Artzy, Michal; Asaro, Frank; Perlman, Isadore (1973). "The Origin of the Palestinian 'Bichrome' Ware". Journal of the American Oriental Society. 93 (4): 446–461. doi:10.2307/600164. JSTOR 600164.
- Albright, William F. (1938). "The Chronology of a South Palestinian City, Tell El-ʿAjjul". American Journal of Semitic Languages and Literatures. 55 (4): 335–359. doi:10.1086/amerjsemilanglit.55.4.3088117. S2CID 171054400. (reprinted in Stewart, J. R. (1974). Kassis, Hanna E. (ed.). Tel El-ʿAjjul: The Middle Bronze Age Remains. Göteborg: P. Aströms Förlag.)
- Bergoffen, Celia (1989). A comparative study of the regional distribution of Cypriote pottery in Canaan and Egypt in the Late Bronze Age. Doctoral Dissertation, Department of Fine Arts, New York University. Ann Arbor, Michigan: University Microfilms. pp. 153–210, 390–496.
- Bergoffen, Celia J. (2001). "The Proto White Slip and White Slip I Pottery from Tell El-Ajjul". The White Slip Ware of Late Bronze Age Cyprus: Proceedings of an International Conference Organized by the Anastasios G. Leventis Foundation, Nicosia, in Honour of Malcolm Wiener. Nicosia, 29th-30th October 1998. Wien: Östterreichischen Akademie der Wissenschaften. pp. 145–156.
- Bergoffen, Celia J. (2001). "The Base Ring Pottery from Tell El-ʿAjjul". In Åström, Paul (ed.). The Chronology of Base-ring Ware and Bichrome Wheel-made Ware: Proceedings of a Colloquium held in the Royal Academy of Letters, History and Antiquities, Stockholm, May 18–19 2000. Stockholm: The Royal Academy of Letters, History, and Antiquities. pp. 31–50.
- Epstein, Claire (1966). Palestinian Bichrome Ware. Leiden: E. J. Brill. pp. passim.
- Fischer, Peter M. (2001). "Cypriote Bichrome Wheel-made Ware and Base-ring Ware from the New Excavations Tell El-ʿAjjul: Synchronism and Dating". In Åström, Paul (ed.). The Chronology of Base-ring Ware and Bichrome Wheel-made Ware: Proceedings of a Colloquium held in the Royal Academy of Letters, History and Antiquities, Stockholm, May 18–19 2000. Stockholm: The Royal Academy of Letters, History, and Antiquities. pp. 221–230.
- Gonen, Rivka (1992). Burial Patterns & Cultural Diversity in Late Bronze Age Canaan. Winona Lake, Indiana: Eisenbrauns. pp. 70–82.
- Heurtley, W. A. "A Palestinian Vase-Painter of the Sixteenth Century B.C.". Quarterly of the Department of Antiquities of Palestine. 8: 21–37.
- Kempinski, Aharon (1974). "Tell el-ʿAjjûl — Beth-Aglayim or Sharuḥen?". Israel Exploration Journal. 24 (3–4): 145–152.
- Kempinski, Aharon (1983). Syrien und Palästina (Kanaan) in der letzten Phase der Mittelbronze-zwei-B-Zeit (1650–1570 v. Chr.). Wiesbaden: Harrassowitz. pp. 131–148.
- Kenyon, Kathleen (1956). "Tombs of the Intermediate Early Bronze–Middle Bronze Age at Tell Ajjul". Annual of the Department of Antiquities (Jordan). 3: 41–55.
- Massafra, Angela (2013). "A Group of Metal Weapons from Tell el-ʿAjjul in the Hunterian Museum, University of Glasgow". Vicino Oriente. XVII: 115–133. doi:10.53131/VO2724-587X2013_7.
- Merrillees, Robert S. (1974). "Appendix III: Tell el-ʿAjjul Fine and Imported Wares". In Kassis, Hanna E. (ed.). Tel el-'Ajjul: The Middle Bronze Age Remains. Göteborg: P. Aströms Förlag.
- Negbi, Oren (1970). The Hoards of Goldwork from Tell el-ʿAjjul. Gothenburg: P. Ästrøm.
- Sparks, Rachael Thyrza (2005). "The Lost Loci of Tell el-ʿAjjul: Petrie's Area C". Palestine Exploration Quarterly. 137 (1): 23–29. doi:10.1179/174313005x37943. S2CID 162607846.
- Sparks, Rachael Thyrza (2007). A Future for the Past: Petrie's Palestinian Collection. Essays and Exhibition Catalogue. London: Institute of Archaeology, University College London.
- Stiebeing, William Henry Jr. (1970). Burial Practices in Palestine During the Bronze Age. Doctoral Dissertation, University of Pennsylvania. Ann Arbor, Michigan: University Microfilms. pp. 46–57, 82–84, 101–129, 146–147, 149–150, 162, 166, 231–242, 287–289, 339–353, 389–404, 430–442.
- Stewart, J. R. (1974). Kassis, Hanna E. (ed.). Tel El-ʿAjjul: The Middle Bronze Age Remains. Göteborg: P. Aströms Förlag.
- Tufnell, Olga (1962). "The Courtyard Cemetery at Tell el-Tell el-ʿAjjul, Palestine". Bulletin of the Institute of Archaeology. 3: 1–37.
- Tufnell, Olga (1980). "A Review of the Contents of Cave 303 at Tell el-ʿAjjul". ʿAtiqot. XIV (English Series): 37–48.

=== Encyclopedia Articles ===
- Dessel, J. P. (1997). "ʿAjjul, Tell el-". In Meyers, Eric M. (ed.). The Oxford Encyclopedia of Archaeology in the Middle East, Vol. 1. New York and Oxford: Oxford University Press. pp. 38–40.
- Liid, Dale (1992). ""ʿAjjul, Tell el-"". In Freedman, David Noel (ed.). The Anchor Bible Dictionary, Vol. I. New York: Doubleday. pp. 133–134.
- Robertson, Brian Mark (1999). The Chronology of the Middle Bronze Age Tombs at Tell el Ajjul. Doctoral Dissertation, Department of Anthropology, University of Utah. Ann Arbor, Michigan: University Microfilms.*
- Tufnell, Olga (1976). "El-ʿAjjul, Tell (Beth ʿEglayim)". In Avi-Yonah, Michael (ed.). Encyclopedia of Archaeological Excavations in the Holy Land, Vol. I. pp. 52–61.
- Tufnell, Olga; Kempinski, Aharon (1993). "ʿAjjul, Tel". In Stern, Ephraim; Lewinson-Gilboa, Ayelet; Aviram, Joseph (eds.). The New Encyclopedia of Archaeological Excavations in the Holy Land, Vol. I. Jerusalem: Israel Exploration Society & Carta. pp. 49–53.

=== Museum Collections ===
- "Institute of Archaeology Collections". Institute of Archaeology Collections. Institute of Archaeology, University College, London. (Search for "place=Ajjul").
