= Tel Shor =

Archaeological site in Jezreel Valley, Israel

- Tell Thora
- Shown in Israel
- 32°39′11.1″N 35°10′06.5″E
- Type: Tell
- Periods: Bronze Age, Iron Age, Persian, Hellenistic, Roman, Byzantine, Early Arab, Crusader, Mamluk, Ottoman, British
- Location: Israel
- Region: Jezreel Valley, Israel

History
- Abandoned: British period

Site notes
- Excavation dates: 2007
- Archaeologists: Avner Raban; Eli Yanai

Tel Shor (Hebrew: תל שור, "mound of the bull"), or Tell Thorah (Arabic: تل ثورة, Tell Thwrah) is an archaeological site in the center of the western Jezreel Valley. It contains a small settlement mound (tell) with an area of 3 dunams (0.30 hectares). It rises to a height of 5–6 metres (16–20 ft) above the alluvial plain. It is situated 1 kilometre (0.62 mi) north of Kishon River. South and west of the mound are springs the form a marsh. The site was surveyed in the past and building stones were found scattered on the mound. Based on the pottery found it was settled as early as the Early Bronze Age and human presence is noted in every period until the modern era. A mausoleum from the Roman era with a stone sarcophagus was damaged during drainage work in the 1960s along with the mound's western edges. An excavation took place around the site in 2007 and discovered several burials, mostly from the Persian period, as well as one burial dated to either the Late Bronze Age or Iron Age and another one from the Roman period in addition to the mausoleum.

The site was suggested by several scholars as the possible location of Maralah (Hebrew: מרעלה), a border town in the possession of the biblical Tribe of Zebulun, mentioned in the Book of Joshua.

== 2009 Excavation ==
The site was first excavated between July–August 2007 in a salvage excavation was conducted north of the site by a team headed by Israeli archaeologist Eli Yannai on behalf of the Israel Antiquities Authority. It was undertaken ahead of laying a railroad track with aid from the Israel Railway Authority. A trench of 100 meters was opened with mechanical equipment west of the mound and thirty squares were excavated north of the mound.

The excavation yielded many potsherds of different periods, several burials and two refuse heaps. Although the mound itself was not excavated, the finds in the provide knowledge about the settlement history of Tel Shor.

== History ==
=== Bronze and Iron Ages ===
The earliest artifacts were found close to the mound in a settlement layer with potsherds from the Early Bronze Age II. North of the site were few potsherds from the Middle and Late Bronze Ages. In one of the burials found in the site was a flask dated either to the Late Bronze Age or to the Early Iron Age. Late Bronze Age clay figurine from imported from Greece was found as well as a chalk Mace. Other potsherds show that the site was settled in the Iron Age II.

=== Persian period ===
Most of the burial tombs were dated to the Persian period. The tombs contained offerings such as jars, juglets and a small amphora. In three of the tombs, there was a rich assemblage of jewelry. Bronze earrings and bracelets, Iron rings. One jewel was made of an unidentified metal, possibly silver. Next to one of the deceased was a vessel decorated with a geometric pattern. Inside the vessel was a needle that was used to apply makeup. One tomb was found within a pit that was lined and covered with ashlar stones. Although no artifacts were found inside, its orientation was and dimensions are similar to those of the other Persian ones.

At some point, during this period the cemetery was no longer used and refuse was left there. A refuse heap contained locally made pottery including bowls, jars, lamps, and cooking pots, as well as imported vessels from Cyprus and Athens.

=== Hellenistic period ===
The area where the Persian tombs and the refuse heap were found continued to be a refuse site during the Hellenistic period. Another heap was found including local made vessels, as well as stamped amphorae from Kos and Rhodes.

=== Roman period ===
The tomb found in the pit from the Persian period was seemingly cleared in the Roman period and was reused as a burial tomb in the Roman period. An adult individual was interred there with glass and stone bottles as offerings. This and the mausoleum indicate this area was probably also used as a cemetery in the Roman period.

=== Ottoman and British periods ===
In the 19th century, the Palestine Exploration Fund visited the place and found small mudbrick hovels near the springs. During the Ottoman period, the site was known as "Tel Tora" or "Tel Thorah". It served as a Turkmen settlement and seasonal settlement for shepherds from the surrounding regions. A well was found nearby that was used until the British rule.

== See also ==
- Tel Shem
