= Tell es-Sakan =

Bronze Age archaeological site in Palestine

- تل السكن (Arabic)
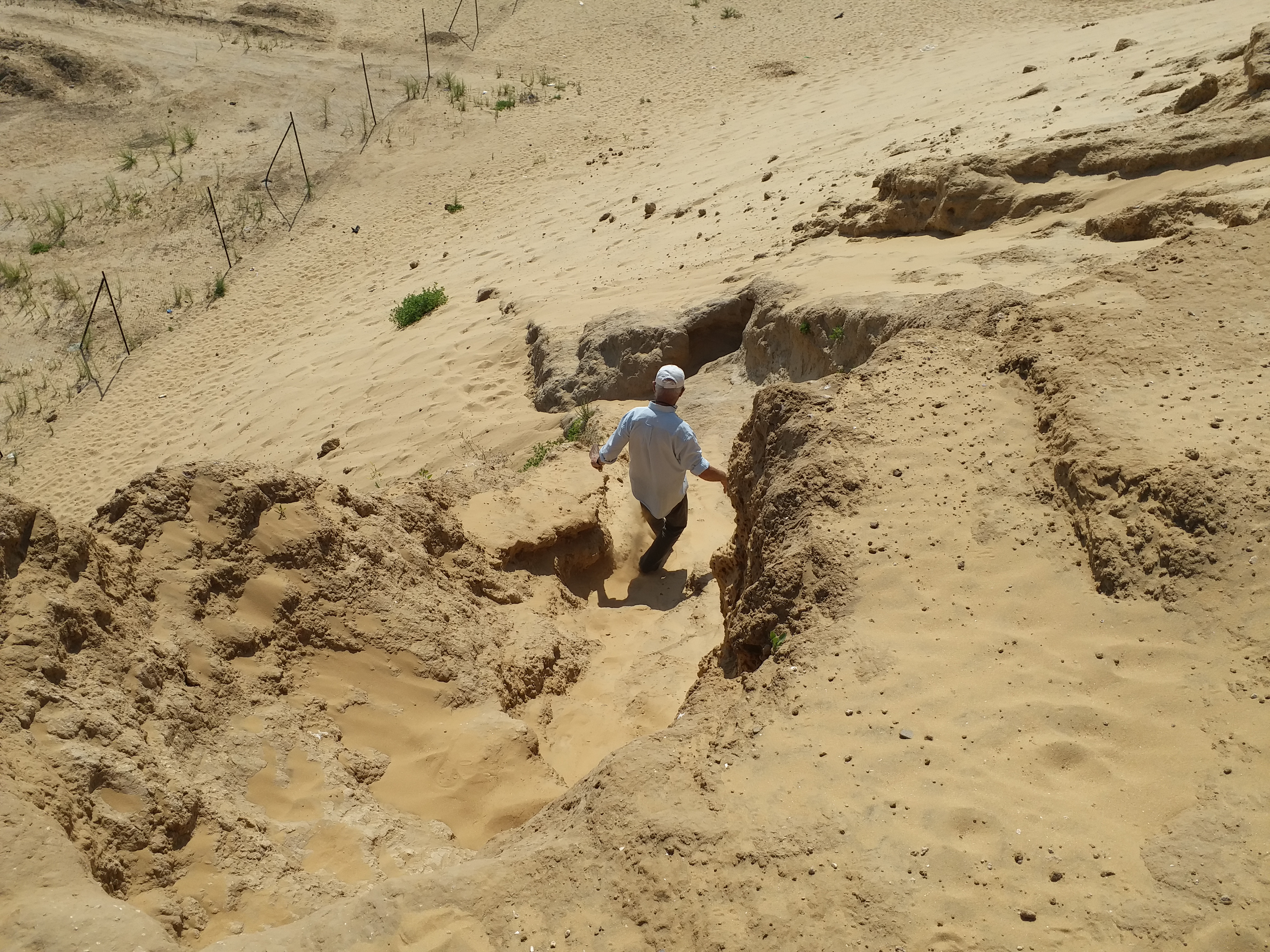
- Tell es-Sakan in September 2017

- Tell es-Sakan within Palestine
- 31°28′33″N 34°24′17″E
- Type: Settlement
- Periods: Bronze Age
- Associated with: Egyptians, Canaanites
- Location: Palestine
- Region: Gaza Strip

History
- Built: c. 3300 BCE
- Abandoned: c. 2250 BCE

Site notes
- Material: Mud brick
- Area: 8–9 ha (20–22 acres)
- Excavation dates: 1999–2000
- Archaeologists: Pierre de Miroschedji; Moain Sadeq
- Condition: Damaged

Tell es-Sakan (Arabic: تل السكن, lit. 'Hill of residence') is a mound created by the accumulation of the remains of consecutive settlements, located about 5 kilometres (3 mi) south of Gaza City in Palestine. This tell was the site of two separate Early Bronze Age urban settlements. During Ancient Egypt's expansion into southwestern Canaan in the latter half of the 4th millennium BCE, Tell es-Sakan was founded as an administrative centre for the Egyptian colonies in the region. It was inhabited from about 3300 BCE to 3000 BCE. After a period of abandonment, a Canaanite city was established around 2600 BCE and inhabited until about 2250 BCE, after which Tell es-Sakan was permanently abandoned.

Tell es-Sakan functioned as a trading post and was positioned along what was probably a dried-up channel of the Wadi Ghazzeh – a watercourse that is dry most of the year but in the Bronze Age would have been navigable. The settlement may have been a successor to Taur Ikhbeineh, a nearby site inhabited in the 34th century BCE. At its discovery in 1998, Tell es-Sakan was the oldest known Egyptian fortification and the only known Egyptian fortified settlement beyond the Nile Valley. A fortification of a potentially similar age was found at the Egyptian settlement of Tel Erani in 2013. After the Canaanite city of Tell es-Sakan was abandoned in the 23rd century BCE, Tell el-Ajjul was established 500 metres (1,600 ft) to the south, likely as a replacement.

The tell was discovered during a building project and subsequently investigated as part of an international collaboration between Palestine's Department of Antiquities and Cultural Heritage and the French National Centre for Scientific Research. Though there were plans for further archaeological research, fieldwork halted after the 2000 season due to the start of the Second Intifada, a Palestinian uprising against Israeli occupation. Finds from Tell es-Sakan have been exhibited in France and Switzerland.

The site covered around 8–9 hectares (20–22 acres), of which 0.14 hectares (0.35 acres) has undergone archaeological excavation; a much larger area has been destroyed as a result of construction and conflict. In 2017, the Hamas government's Land Authority began bulldozing part of the site to clear the way for a building project. Still, it halted following opposition from various groups, including the government's Ministry of Tourism and Antiquities and the Islamic University of Gaza. The site was further damaged as a result of the Gaza war.

== Location ==
Tell es-Sakan is located in the Gaza Strip, north of the present course of the Wadi Ghazzeh and less than 1.6 kilometres (1 mi) inland from Palestine's modern Mediterranean coast. It is in the al-Zahra neighbourhood, 5 kilometres (3.1 mi) south of Gaza City. Wadis are watercourses that are dry most of the year and are found in arid locations; the Wadi Gazzeh in the Gaza Strip has a dry season typically beginning in May and lasting until September, and a wet season from October to April.

When Tell es-Sakan was rediscovered, the area was fertile and suitable for agriculture. The landscape includes ancient sand dunes which have turned into rock, or lithified. One such dune concealed Tell es-Sakan so that the site's full extent is uncertain, but it covers an estimated 8–9 hectares (20–22 acres). From the late 1990s al-Zahra developed as a residential area, and population growth has led to homes being built close to the archaeological site.

A tell is a mound created by layers upon layers of human occupation on a site over an extended period. The mound rose more than 10 metres (33 ft) above the coastal plain. In the Bronze Age, the coast was closer to Tell es-Sakan than today. The settlement likely possessed a harbour on a now silted-up channel of the Wadi Ghazzeh, which was navigable to at least this point. A change in the Wadi Ghazzeh's course may have led to Tell es-Sakan's final abandonment in the late 3rd millennium BCE. The area was a frontier between ancient Egypt and Canaan, with both Egyptians and Canaanites inhabiting Tell es-Sakan in different stages of the city's history.

== History ==
In 1998, the accidental exposure of the Early Bronze Age site during the construction of a housing complex brought to light the only settlement discovered in the Gaza Strip that was inhabited between 3300 BCE and 2250 BCE, with remains of mud-brick constructions and a wealth of other findings dating exclusively to that period. Tell es-Sakan was located near a ford on the coastal road leading to Egypt, the Via Maris, and has enabled archaeologists to study the interaction between Egypt and Canaan during the period the tell was occupied. It appears to be the predecessor to Tell el-Ajjul, a major city of the 2nd millennium BCE located 500 metres (1,600 ft) further south.

The site was occupied during two distinct periods: the lower levels of "Sounding A" (Note: Three trenches were excavated and are referred to as "Soundings" in the archaeological reports.) produced the earliest evidence of activity, which dated to the end of the 4th millennium BCE and belonged to a city of the Egyptian Protodynastic Period – which corresponds to the Early Bronze Age IB period in the history of the southern Levant. The middle and upper levels of "Sounding B" and "Sounding C" belonged to a Canaanite settlement of the 3rd millennium BCE. The majority of the animal remains were sheep and goat; cattle and pig bones were also discovered, as well as shells and fish bones. The occurrence of pig bones was largely restricted to Tell es-Sakan's Egyptian phase. Cereals and legumes were cultivated, along with olives, grapes, and figs.

=== Egyptian city (3300–3000 BCE) ===
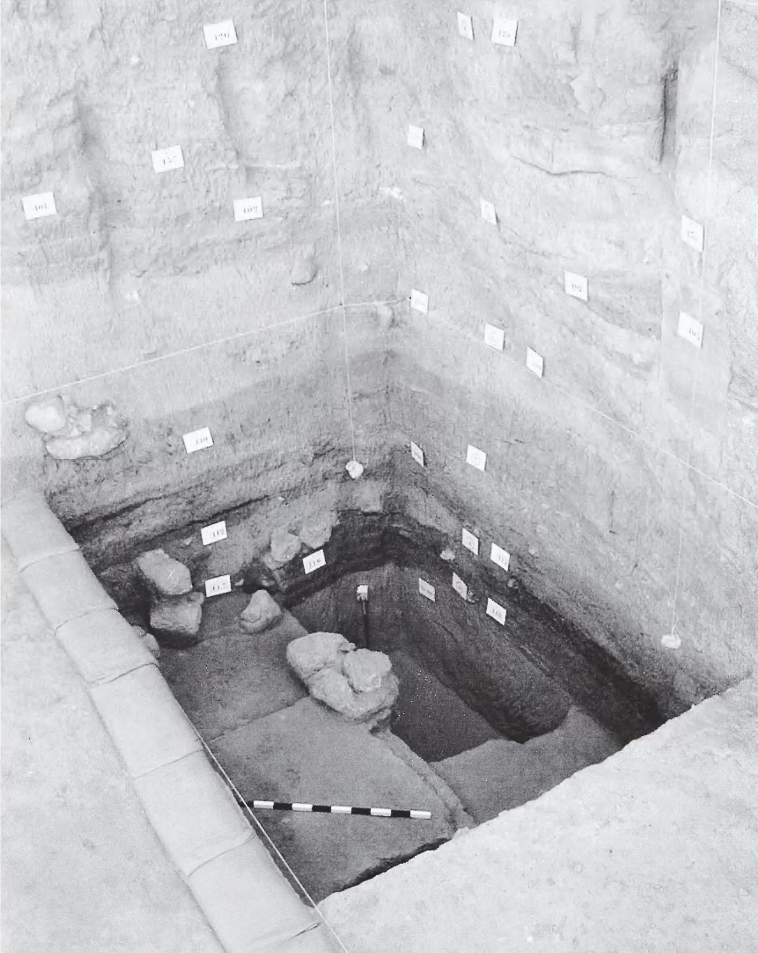
"Sounding A" of the excavations contained remains of Tell es-Sakan's Egyptian phase.

The first settlement at Tell es-Sakan was established around 3300 BCE. It was an Egyptian colony, and archaeologists discovered the remains of mud-brick buildings, defensive walls, and ceramic materials from this phase of habitation. The remains provided dating evidence for activity at Tell es-Sakan through radiocarbon dating of seed samples and comparison of artefacts to other Egyptian archaeological sites. Tell es-Sakan began as an unfortified settlement, and an enclosing wall was added later. The wall of the Egyptian city was initially 1.5 metres (4 ft 11 in) thick and then widened to 3.55 metres (11.6 ft). Tell es-Sakan's defences were then demolished and replaced with another wall, this time 3.8 metres (12 ft) thick and enhanced by a glacis.

The excavators found the remains of houses and domestic structures. The oldest remains on the site had been damaged by the mechanical diggers. Though no single house was fully excavated, some of the buildings had hearths and brick-built silos – of a type typical of Egyptian architecture. Such silos were typically used for storing grain. One building also had a structure that may be a bread oven. The pottery associated with the first city was mostly (90%–95%) Egyptian in style, and at least three-quarters of the portable material culture was produced locally, emulating Egyptian styles. Sherds of pottery bearing serekhs from wine jars were also recovered from the Egyptian phase of the site. Serekhs were emblems bearing the names of pharaohs, and can help with dating activity at a site. Amongst the serekhs found at Tell es-Sakan was one that may feature the name of Pharaoh Narmer who established the First Dynasty of Egypt.

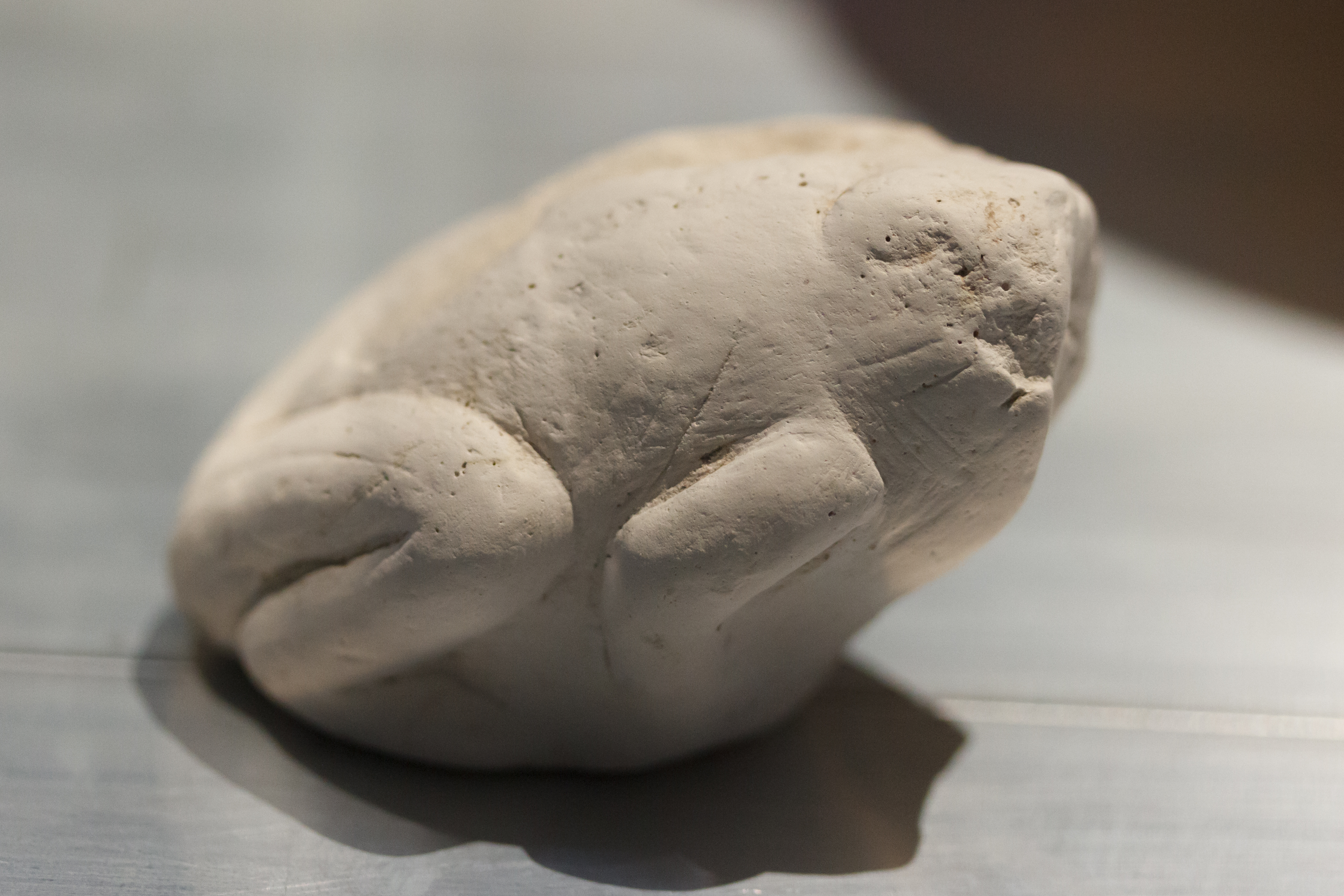
A limestone carving of a frog was found in "Sounding A" amongst material dated to the last third of the 4th millennium BCE. It may be a votive offering dedicated to Heqet, an Egyptian goddess with the head of a frog.

The archaeologists who led the excavations at Tell es-Sakan, Pierre de Miroschedji and Moain Sadeq, proposed that there were three areas of Egyptian expansion into the southern Levant during the late 4th millennium BCE, and Tell es-Sakan was one of the major settlements in the region. Tell es-Sakan and the much smaller settlement at En Besor were part of an area of permanent Egyptian settlement. Extending north along the coast were areas of Egyptian influence (including sites such as Tel Erani and Ascalon), with Egyptian and Canaanite populations living in the same areas, sometimes with seasonal movement. Beyond this area, extending further north and east inland, sites such as Tell Abu al-Kharaz and Tel Megiddo had trading contacts with Egypt. Taur Ikhbeineh was a nearby Egyptian settlement inhabited during the 34th century BCE. De Miroschedji and Sadeq suggest that Tell es-Sakan may have effectively been a successor settlement to Taur Ikhbeineh.

Tell es-Sakan was exceptional in possessing fortifications, which may indicate that it was essential in the region, and may have acted as the administrative centre of the colonial domain established by the Egyptians in southwestern Canaan. It functioned as a trading post and the quantity of wine jars discovered at the site led the excavators to suggest that wine from the region was being exported to Egypt. Archaeobotanical evidence consisting of plant remains found at Tell es-Sakan demonstrates that the inhabitants consumed cereals, legumes, and figs.

De Miroschedji suggests that Tell es-Sakan may correspond to the settlement of Wenet, an Egyptian fortified settlement recorded in the First Dynasty period which roughly spanned 3000 to 2840 BCE. Habitation at Egyptian Tell es-Sakan lasted until about 3000 BCE (the very end of Early Bronze Age I and the beginning of Early Bronze Age II). (Note: The Bronze Age in the Levant is split into three parts – Early, Middle, and Late – each with its own subdivisions. The boundaries between periods are often ranges, and for the Early Bronze Age (EBA) they are: EBA I: 3900/3700 BCE to 3200/3000 BCE; EBA II: 3200/3000 BCE to 2850/2600 BCE; EBA III: 2850/2600 BCE to 2500/2300 BCE; EBA IV: 2500/2300 BCE to 2200/1900 BCE (also referred to as the Intermediate Bronze Age or Middle Bronze Age I in different systems)) This conclusion is based on a small amount of finds at Tell es-Sakan post-dating this period, either discovered through excavations or through recovery during the demolition of parts of the site. The abandonment was likely peaceful. It may have coincided with the beginning of the First Dynasty of Egypt, perhaps under the reign of one of the successors of Pharaoh Narmer, such as Hor-Aha or Den.

=== Canaanite city (2600–2250 BCE) ===
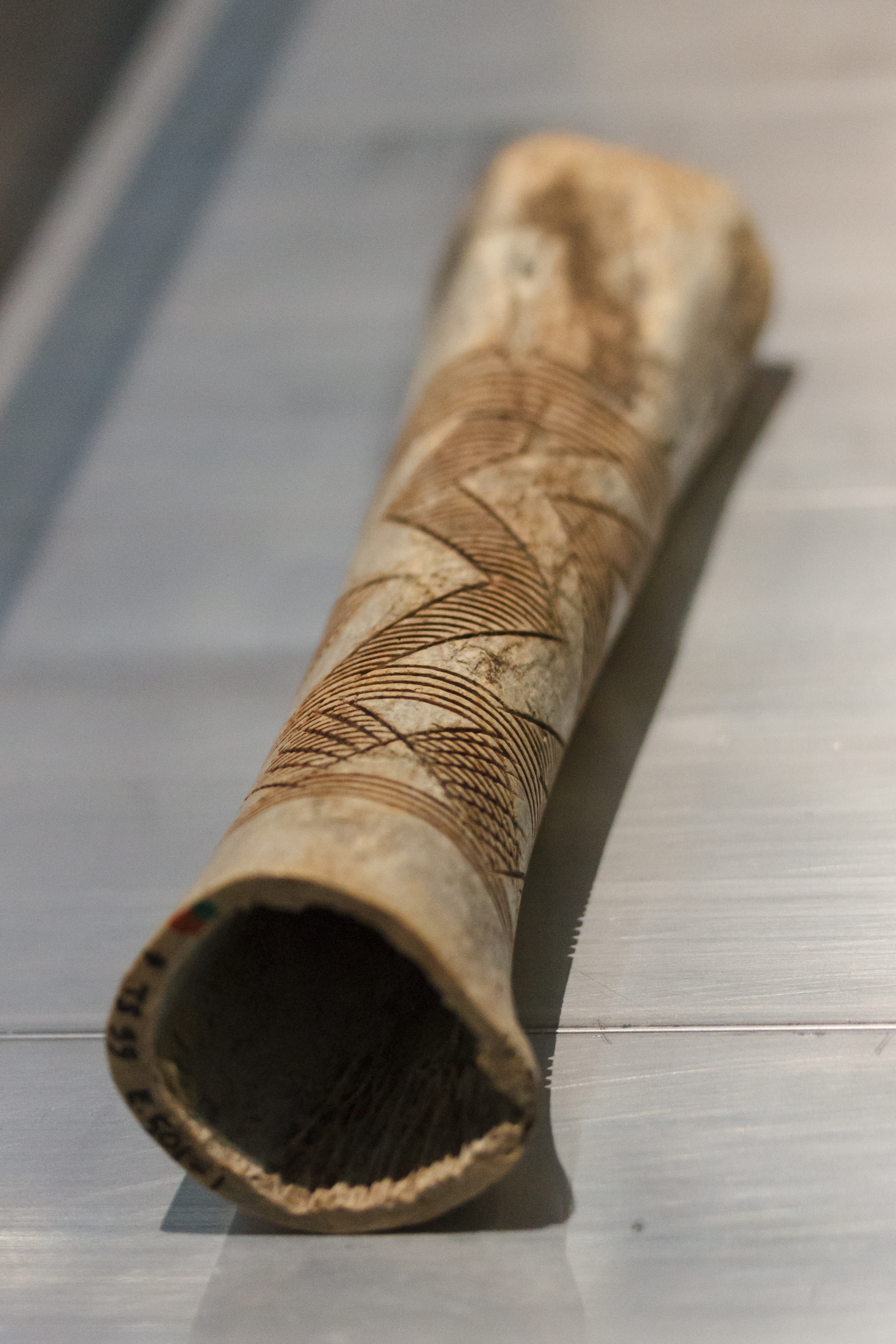
A decorated bone handle discovered at Tell es-Sakan was displayed at the Institut du Monde Arabe as part of the Saved Treasures of Gaza: 5000 Years of History exhibition in 2025. The handle was found during the excavations and associated with the Canaanite city.

The Egyptian colonial domain in the region eventually disappeared, and the site lay abandoned for several centuries. Consequently, there were very few active settlements in the southern coastal area during the Early Bronze Age II. Around 2600 BCE, during the Early Bronze Age III period and near the beginning of the Egyptian Fourth Dynasty, the Canaanites reoccupied the site. They created a new fortified city that served as a capital. At this point the Wadi Ghazzeh formed a natural border between Canaan and Egypt. The earliest phases from the reoccupation of the site were found in "Sounding C"; pottery vessels recovered from this area were Canaanite in style, and similar to pottery found at Tel Yarmuth dating from the Early Bronze Age IIIA.

De Miroschedji and Sadeq described Tell es-Sakan as having "both a strong local particularism and close ties with the sites of inner Canaan". The walls enclosing the settlement at that time were 7.8 metres (26 ft) thick and built of sun-dried mud bricks – larger than the walls of the Egyptian settlement. Based on the size of the defences, Tell es-Sakan was a major Canaanite settlement. As well as the fortification, the archaeologists found a residential area with buildings surviving in parts to a height of nearly 2 metres (6 ft 7 in).

The walls and floors were limewashed. Despite the discovery of multiple buildings, only one doorway was found, which suggests that these structures typically had entrances above ground-floor level. The excavators noted that "The overlapping of dwellings ... implies a high degree of urbanization" (French: "L'imbrication des habitations ... elle suppose un fort degré d'urbanisation"). At the edge of the excavated area was the corner of a building; though this was not excavated to determine its use, the thickness of the walls may indicate that it was a public building rather than a house.

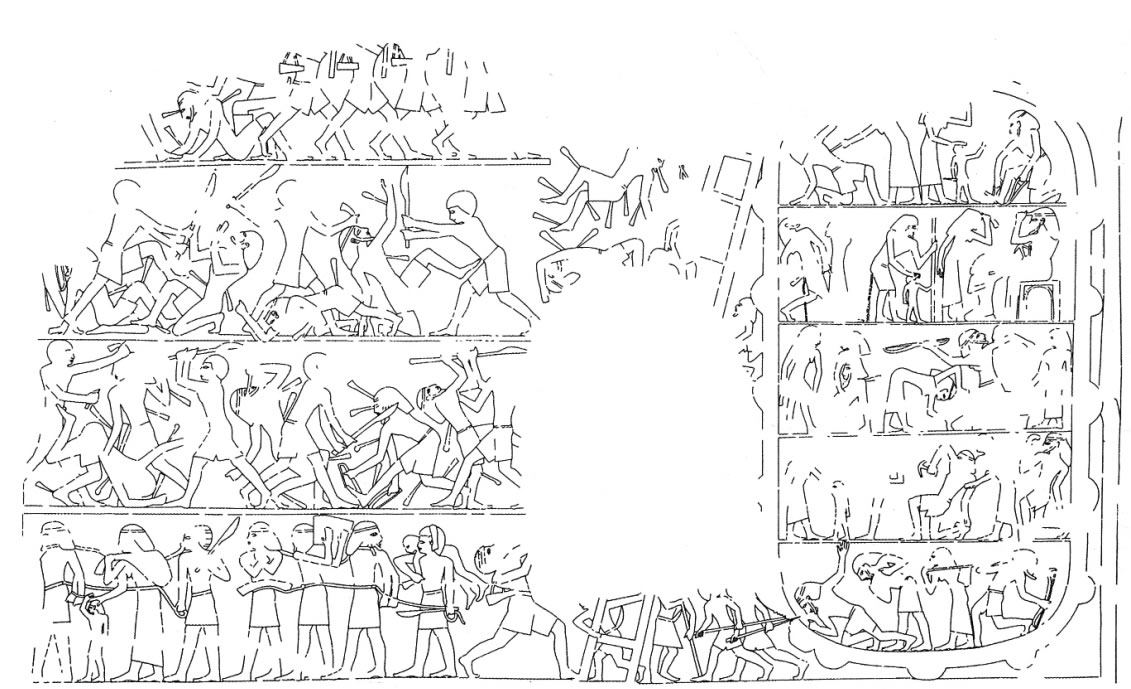
A relief from the tomb of Inti, an Egyptian official, describing a siege of a walled city (shown on the right). De Miroschedji has questioned whether the city may be Tell es-Sakan, given the possibility that an Egyptian army may have attacked it.

Animal bones found at Tell es-Sakan indicate that the consumption of pigs ceased during the Canaanite settlement, in contrast to the Egyptian settlement, from which porcine bones comprised 24% of the bones recovered from the site. The archaeozoologist Naomi Sykes wrote that "The reasons for this shift are uncertain, but it may reflect a change in cultural dietary preferences following the break in Egyptian occupation. Alternatively, it could be related to broader economic trends."

Due to Tell es-Sakan's position near a ford across the Wadi Ghazzeh, the city may have been attacked by Uni who was governor of Upper Egypt during the reign of Pharaoh Pepi I Meryre in the late 23rd and early 22nd centuries BCE. Uni conducted military campaigns against the Heriou-Sha, a people who lived in the coastal zone and de Miroschedji suggested that Tell es-Sakan was one of the settlements they inhabited. The settlement was abandoned around 2250 BCE.

The latter half of the 3rd millennium BCE (2500–2000 BCE) saw the widespread abandonment of large settlements in the Levant, a transition to smaller settlements, and possibly a resurgence in nomadic living. De Miroschedji hypothesised that a change in the Wadi Ghazzeh's course led to the abandonment of Tell es-Sakan in favour of Tell el-Ajjul, about 500 metres (1,600 ft) to the south. Another nearby site, al-Moghraqa, was occupied in the early 2nd millennium BCE (during the Middle and Late Bronze Ages).

== Discovery and investigation ==
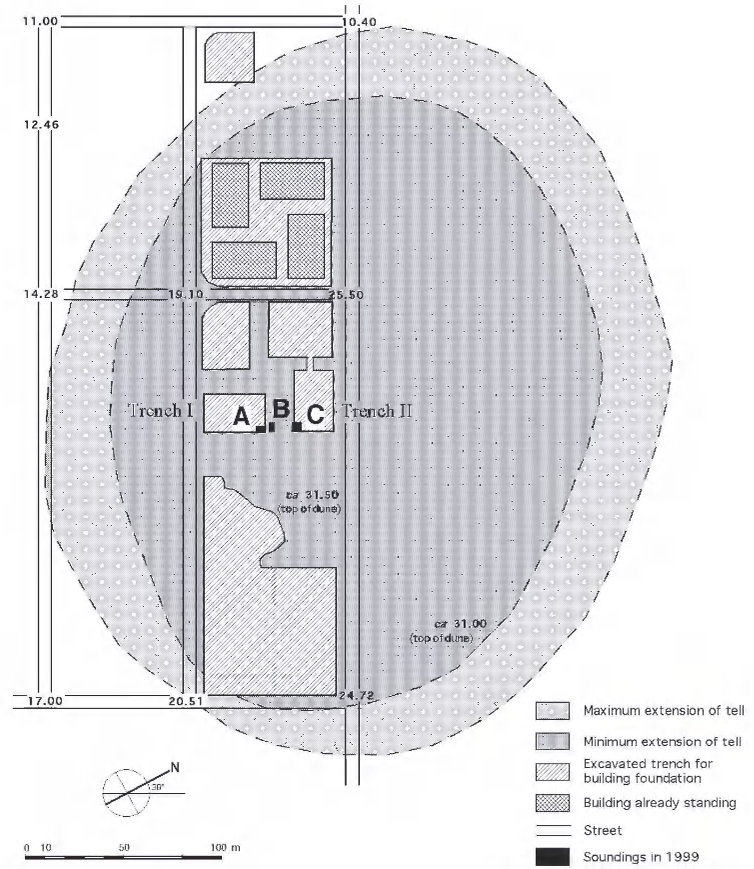
Plan of excavations and approximate extent of Tell es-Sakan (click for annotations) (Note: The indication of north on the plan differs from the plan in The New Encyclopedia of Archaeological Excavations in the Holy Land.)

In 1994, the newly formed Palestinian Authority established the Department of Antiquities and Cultural Heritage to manage cultural heritage in Palestine. The department later became part of the Ministry of Tourism and Antiquities. This gave Palestinians a greater role in the investigation and interpretation of their heritage. At its inception, the department had limited resources and a small number of experienced staff. Still, through international collaboration over the course of fifteen years, it had overseen 500 investigations in Palestine. An increasing number of building projects led to more discoveries of archaeological sites in Palestine, which needed to be recorded; Tell es-Sakan is one such site.

Surveys of the region over several decades failed to detect the tell. It was discovered by chance in 1998 during the construction of a housing complex on the south side of what was later identified as a tell. Tell es-Sakan was the first archaeological site discovered in Gaza that dates from the end of the Early Bronze Age I and Early Bronze Age II to III periods (spanning the 4th and 3rd millennia BCE) – a poorly represented span in the region's archaeological record. The foundation trenches for the planned buildings exposed archaeological deposits but caused significant damage to the site in the process.

Construction work was suspended to allow archaeological investigations. Archaeologists Pierre de Miroschedji and Moain Sadeq led a three-week rescue excavation at Tell es-Sakan in September 1999. It was an international collaboration: Sadeq was director of the Department of Antiquities and Cultural Heritage, and de Miroschedji was a director at the French National Centre for Scientific Research. Three boreholes were dug on the west side of the site; the extracted core samples demonstrated that the archaeological layers extended to a depth of 9 metres (30 ft) and established the chronology of the site.

The area was further investigated through trial excavations using the foundation trenches. Franco-Palestinian collaboration continued in 2000 with a large-scale excavation campaign involving three different areas on the west side of the site covering a total area of c. 1,400 m^{2}. Three areas were methodically investigated, allowing archaeologists to develop a broad chronology of the site. The excavated area, referred to as "Sounding A" in the published literature, covered an area of 525 square metres (5,650 sq ft) and was excavated to a depth of 9 metres (30 ft). "Sounding B" and "Sounding C" covered 425 and 400 square metres (4,570 and 4,310 sq ft) respectively.

The discovery of large amounts of ash during investigations led to the site being named Tell es-Sakan, meaning 'hill of ash'. The defensive walls marked Tell es-Sakan as the oldest known fortified Egyptian site and at the time the only Egyptian fortified settlement beyond the Nile Valley. In 2013, the wall of a fortification was excavated at Tel Erani – an Egyptian settlement north-east of Tell es-Sakan and located in modern-day Israel – which was thought to be of a similar age to the fortifications at Tell es-Sakan.

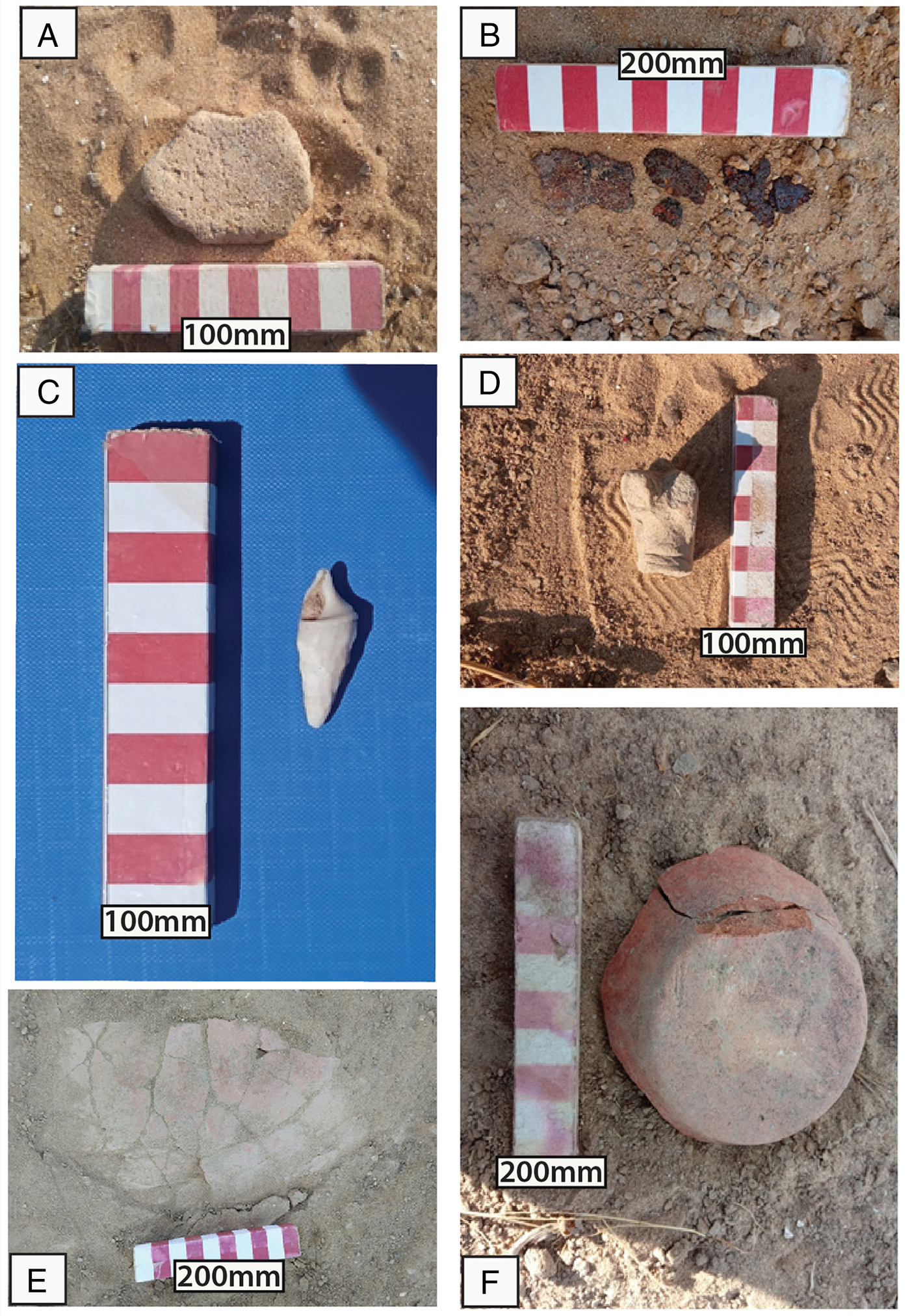
During the 2022 survey by the GAZAMAP project, surface finds were discovered, including ceramics and metal items.

The Second Intifada, a Palestinian uprising against Israeli occupation starting in late 2000, led to the cessation of many archaeological projects in Palestine, including the excavations at Tell es-Sakan. Investigations by the Gaza Research Project at the nearby Bronze Age site of al-Moghraqa, which had been discovered by Sadeq in 1996, were also abandoned. An exhibition titled "Mediterranean Gaza" of 221 items from archaeological sites in the Gaza Strip – including a selection of finds from Tell es-Sakan – was held at the Institut du Monde Arabe (IMA) in Paris in 2000. When the Second Intifada began in September that year, the exhibition at the IMA had not concluded, and Leila Shahid, the Ambassador of Palestine to France, arranged for the safe storage of the artefacts in Paris. In 2007 the artefacts were transferred to Geneva for an exhibition at the Musée d'Art et d'Histoire titled "Gaza at the Crossroad of Civilizations". Though further field investigation was not possible, five seed samples recovered from Tell es-Sakan were radiocarbon dated in the 2010s.

In 2022, the Gaza Maritime Archaeology Project (GAZAMAP), a collaboration between researchers based in Gaza and the UK, conducted a field survey of Tell es-Sakan. GAZAMAP's objective was to evaluate the condition of various endangered maritime archaeological sites. The fieldwork was conducted by Ayman Hassouna of the Islamic University of Gaza, who led a group of ten students. They identified surviving features that had been exposed on the site, and found material culture including pottery, flints, and stone tools. The discovery of a large number of shells confirmed that the site was near the coast during its Bronze Age use. The project also identified priority areas for ongoing monitoring to safeguard the site.

== Later history and conservation ==
External videos
- YouTube video
- A video showing the state of Tell es-Sakan in 2021, after the bulldozing of 2017, by Arab Reporters for Investigative Journalism

Tell es-Sakan underwent significant changes in 2003–2004 and 2005–2014. In the wake of the 2008–2009 Gaza War, the 2012 Gaza War, and the 2014 Gaza War, displaced people temporarily lived on the east of the archaeological site. Economic and demographic pressures, along with new building developments in the area, have also presented challenges to preserving Tell es-Sakan. The construction of new buildings for the University of Palestine in 2009 and 2012 encroached on the west and north sides of the tell, leading to the destruction of approximately one-quarter of the archaeological site.

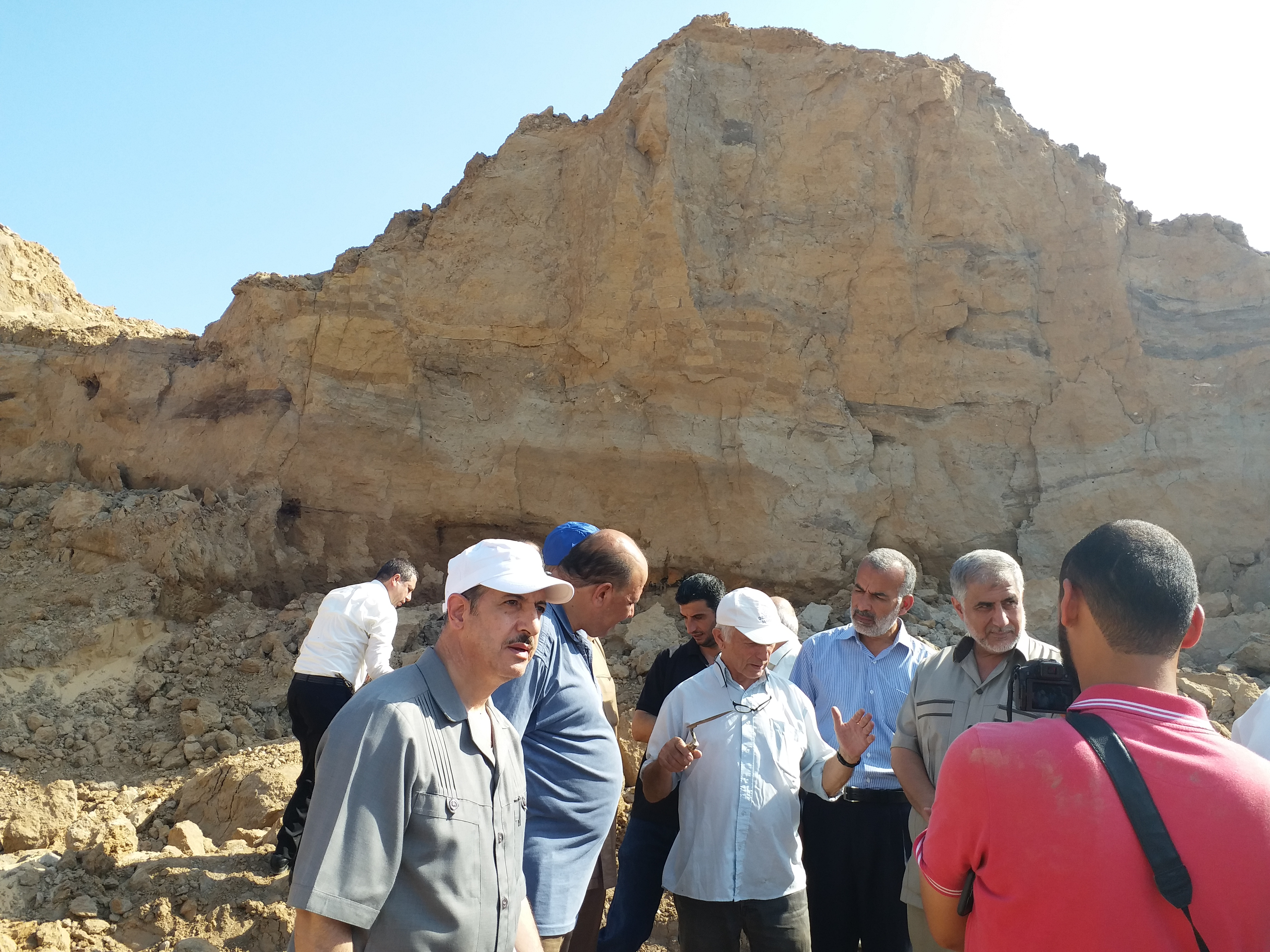
Archaeologists visited Tell es-Sakan in September 2017 during a pause in demolition by Hamas.

In August 2017, the Hamas government's Land Authority began to bulldoze the site to utilise the land as compensation for some of Hamas' senior employees. This led to protests and disagreements between the Land Authority and the Ministry of Tourism and Antiquities, which opposed the work. Pressure from the ministry, the Islamic University of Gaza and archaeologists led to a two-week pause. The work concentrated on the south side of the tell and had destroyed over 1.2 hectares (3.0 acres).

A UNESCO representative, Junaid Sorosh-Wali, described the destruction as "disastrous for the archaeology and cultural heritage in Palestine". The resumption of bulldozing led to further protests, including a social media campaign by a youth group, which attracted further media attention. Palestinian archaeologist Fadel al-Athal was able to recover fragments of pottery. Demolition halted in October 2017. Satellite imagery from 2018 showed evidence of bulldozing, and by 2021, there had been further clearance, and a new road had been built running north-east to south-west.

The Gaza war caused damage to many cultural heritage sites; UNESCO has verified damage at more than 150 sites, including Tell es-Sakan. Using satellite imagery, GAZAMAP found that residential buildings in the vicinity of Tell es-Sakan had been destroyed. The extent of the damages to the archaeological site remained uncertain as of November 2023. From June to September 2024, an international team of researchers evaluated the impact of the war on heritage sites in Gaza using techniques including remote sensing and field observation. The survey found that Tell es-Sakan was severely affected by bomb and bulldozer damage. Bulldozers had demolished the east corner of the tell, possibly for a temporary military installation. The authors advocated for resumed excavations at Tell es-Sakan as a programme of recovery for heritage sites in the Gaza Strip. Finds from Tell es-Sakan were again displayed at the Institut du Monde Arabe in 2025 as part of the exhibition Saved Treasures of Gaza: 5000 Years of History. Composer Davide Verotta wrote a piece of classical music titled "Tell es-Sakan" as a protest against the Gaza war; it was performed at the San Francisco Community Music Center in March 2025.

== See also ==
- List of archaeological sites in the Gaza Strip

== Bibliography ==
- Akram, Fares (6 October 2017). "In Gaza, Hamas levels an ancient treasure". AP News. Archived from the original on 5 June 2024.
- al-Amoudi, Moath (26 October 2017). "Young Gazans mobilize to save Palestine's oldest archaeological site". Al-Monitor. Archived from the original on 5 June 2024.
- Andreou, Georgia M. (2023). Gaza Maritime Archaeology Project (PDF) (Report). Honor Frost Foundation. Archived (PDF) from the original on 7 June 2024.
- Andreou, Georgia; Elkhoudary, Yasmeen (12 May 2022), GAZAMAP – Maritime archaeological survey and assessment at Tell Ruqeish and Tell es-Sakan (Gaza Strip) – 2022, Honor Frost Foundation
- Andreou, Georgia M.; Elkhoudary, Yasmeen; Hassouna, Ayman (2024). "New investigations in Gaza's heritage landscapes: the Gaza Maritime Archaeology Project (GAZAMAP)". Antiquity. 98 (400) e24: 1–9. doi:10.15184/aqy.2024.68.
- Andreou, Georgia M.; Fradley, M.; Blue, L.; Breen, C. (2024). "Establishing a baseline for the study of maritime cultural heritage in the Gaza Strip". Palestine Exploration Quarterly. 156 (1): 4–42. doi:10.1080/00310328.2022.2037923.
- Armaly, Fareed (2008). "Crossroads and contexts: interviews on archaeology in Gaza". Journal of Palestine Studies. 37 (2): 43–81. doi:10.1525/jps.2008.37.2.43.
- Bats, Adeline; Licitra, Nadia; Joffroy, Thierry; Lamouroux, Bastien; Feuillas, Aurélie; Depaux, Julie (2023). "The Egyptian mud-brick silo. Technical and functional analysis of a grain storage device". In Bats, Adeline; Licitra, Nadia (eds.). Storage in ancient Egypt and Nubia. Earthen architecture and building techniques. Sidestone Press. pp. 151–171. ISBN 978-94-6426-225-4.
- Bergoffen, Celia J. (2023). "The Middle to Late Bronze Age transition at Tell el-ʿAjjul in the light of exchanges between Cyprus and the Eastern Mediterranean". In Hausleiter, Arnulf (ed.). Material Worlds: Interdisciplinary Approaches to Contacts and Exchange in the Ancient Near East: Proceedings of the Workshop held at the Institute for the Study of the Ancient World (ISAW), New York University 7th March 2016. Archaeopress. pp. 45–52. doi:10.2307/JJ.15135934.11.
- Berretta, Daniela; Barzak, Ibrahim (23 August 2013). "Archaeologists race against time and turmoil to save Gaza's ancient ruins". NBC News. Archived from the original on 15 August 2022.
- Centre for Cultural Heritage Preservation (January 2025). Damage and Risk Assessment of Cultural Heritage Under Attack in the Gaza Strip (PDF) (Report). State of Palestine Ministry of Tourism and Antiquities. Archived from the original (PDF) on 29 July 2025.
- Clarke, Joanne; Steel, Louise (1999), "Demographic patterns and differential settlement in the Bronze Age landscape of Palestine" (PDF), in Abu-Lughod, Ibrahim; Heacock, Roger; Nashef, Khaled (eds.), The Landscape of Palestine: Equivocal Poetry, University of Birzeit, pp. 211–231
- Cuddy, Alice (2023). "The end of Gaza's most beautiful neighbourhood". BBC News. Archived from the original on 10 November 2023.
- Dee, Michael; Wengrow, David; Shortland, Andrew; Stevenson, Alice; Brock, Fiona; Girdland Flink, Linus; Bronk Ramsey, Christopher (2013). "An absolute chronology for early Egypt using radiocarbon dating and Bayesian statistical modelling". Proceedings of the Royal Society A: Mathematical, Physical and Engineering Sciences. 469 (2159). Bibcode:2013RSPSA.46930395D. doi:10.1098/rspa.2013.0395. PMC 3780825. PMID 24204188.
- El Khoudary, Yasmeen (2019), "Gaza's historical cycles of prosperity and destruction: Is the present an aberration?", in Yacobi, Haim; Nasasra, Mansour (eds.), Routledge Handbook on Middle East Cities (1 ed.), Routledge, pp. 89–103, doi:10.4324/9781315625164-7, ISBN 978-1-315-62516-4
- Geranpayeh, Sarvy (28 November 2023). "Bombing of Gaza has damaged or destroyed more than 100 heritage sites, NGO report reveals". The Art Newspaper. Archived from the original on 28 January 2024.
- Hamdan Taha, Mohamed (2010). "The current state of archaeology in Palestine". Present Pasts. 2 (1): 16–25. doi:10.5334/pp.17.
- Institut du Monde Arabe (2025), Saved Treasures of Gaza: 5000 Years of History. Visitor's guide (PDF), Institut du Monde Arabe
- Kitchen, K. A. (1991). "The chronology of ancient Egypt". World Archaeology. 23 (2): 201–208. Bibcode:1991WoArc..23..201K. doi:10.1080/00438243.1991.9980172.
- Matthews, Roger; Cornelia, Roemer (2003), Ancient Perspectives on Egypt, UCL Press & Routledge, ISBN 978-1-84472002-6
- Matthews, Wendy (2020), "Tells in Archaeology", in Smith, Claire (ed.), Encyclopedia of Global Archaeology, Springer International Publishing, pp. 10553–10556, doi:10.1007/978-3-030-30018-0_1512, ISBN 978-3-030-30016-6
- de Miroschedji, Pierre (2012), "Egypt and southern Canaan in the third millennium BCE: Uni's asiatic campaigns revisited", in Gruber, Mayer; Aḥituv, Shmuel; Lehmann, Gunnar; Talshir, Zipora (eds.), All the Wisdom of the East: Studies in Near Eastern Archaeology and History in Honor of Eliezer D. Oren, Academic Press Fribourg and Vandenhoeck & Ruprecht, pp. 265–291, ISBN 978-3-7278-1719-9
- de Miroschedji, Pierre (2015). "Les relations entre l'Égypte et le levant aux IVe et IIIe millénaires à la lumière des fouilles de Tell Es-Sakan" [Relations between Egypt and the Levant in the 4th and 3rd millennia in the light of the excavations at Tell Es-Sakan]. Comptes rendus des séances de l'Académie des Inscriptions et Belles-Lettres (in French). 159 (2): 1003–1038. doi:10.3406/CRAI.2015.94831.
- de Miroschedji, Pierre (2 March 2018). "Gaza Méditerranéenne, histoire et archéologie en Palestine (exposition)" [Mediterranean Gaza, history and archaeology in Palestine (exhibition)]. Encyclopædia Universalis (in French). Archived from the original on 8 June 2024.
- de Miroschedji, Pierre; Sadeq, Moain (2000a), "Travaux archéologiques à Tell Sakan (Bande de Gaza) en 1999" [Archaeological work at Tell Sakan (Gaza Strip) in 1999], Orient express: Notes et nouvelles d'archéologie orientale (in French), 2000/2: 30–32
- de Miroschedji, Pierre; Sadeq, Moain (2000b), "Tell es-Sakan, un site du Bronze ancien découvert dans la région de Gaza (information)" [Tell es-Sakan, an Early Bronze Age site discovered in the Gaza region (information)], Comptes rendus des séances de l'Académie des Inscriptions et Belles-Lettres (in French), 144 (1): 123–144, doi:10.3406/crai.2000.16103
- de Miroschedji, Pierre; Sadeq, Moain (2005), "The frontier of Egypt in the Early Bronze Age: preliminary soundings at Tell es-Sakan (Gaza Strip)", in Clarke, Joanne (ed.), Archaeological Perspectives on the Transmission and Transformation of Culture in the Eastern Mediterranean, Council for British Research in the Levant, pp. 155–169, ISBN 978-1-84217-168-4, JSTOR j.ctv310vqks.24
- de Miroschedji, Pierre; Sadeq, Moain (2008). "Sakan, Tell es-". The New Encyclopedia of Archaeological Excavations in the Holy Land. Vol. 5: Supplementary Volume. Israel Exploration Society/Biblical Archaeology Society (BAS). Archived from the original on 23 June 2024 – via BAS Library.
- de Miroschedji, Pierre; Sadeq, Moain; Faltings, Dina; Boulez, Virginie; Naggiar-Moliner, Laurence; Sykes, Naomi; Tengberg, Margareta (2001). "Les fouilles de Tell es-Sakan (Gaza): nouvelles données sur les contacts égypto-cananéens aux IVe-IIIe millénaires" [The excavations of Tell es-Sakan (Gaza): new data on Egyptian-Canaanite contacts in the 4th-3rd millennia]. Paléorient (in French). 27 (2): 75–104. doi:10.3406/paleo.2001.4732.
- Morhange, Christophe; Hamdan Taha, Mohamed; Humbert, Jean-Baptiste; Marriner, Nick (2005), "Human settlement and coastal change in Gaza since the Bronze Age", Méditerranée, 104 (104): 75–78, doi:10.4000/mediterranee.2252
- Oren, Eliezer D.; Yekutieli, Yuval (1992), "Taur Ikhbeineh: earliest evidence for Egyptian interconnections", in van den Brink, Edwin C. M. (ed.), The Nile delta in transition: 4th–3rd millennium BC. Proceedings of the seminar held in Cairo, 21–24 October 1990, The Netherlands Institute of Archaeology and Arabic Studies, pp. 361–84, ISBN 978-9-65221015-9
- Pressman, Jeremy (2006). "The Second Intifada: Background and Causes of the Israeli-Palestinian Conflict". Journal of Conflict Studies. 23 (2).
- Şen, Zekai (2008). Wadi Hydrology. CRC Press. ISBN 978-1-4200-6154-3.
- Sharon, Ilan (2013). "Levantine chronology". The Oxford Handbook of the Archaeology of the Levant. Oxford University Press. pp. 44–65. doi:10.1093/oxfordhb/9780199212972.013.004. ISBN 978-0-19-921297-2.
- Smith, Bernard (29 October 2017). "Bronze Age site in Gaza endangered by desperate need for housing". Al Jazeera. Archived from the original on 5 June 2024.
- Steel, Louise; Clarke, Joanne; Sadeq, Moain; Manley, Bill; McCarthy, Andrew; Munro, R. Neil (2004), "Gaza Research Project. Report on the 1999 and 2000 seasons at al-Moghraqa", Levant, 36 (1): 37–88, doi:10.1179/007589104790600950
- UNESCO (26 February 2026), Gaza Strip: Damage assessment, UNESCO, archived from the original on 12 March 2026
- Wayne, Sharon, ed. (2025), Tell es-Sakan: an interview with Composer Davide Verotta (PDF), San Francisco Community Music Center, archived from the original (PDF) on 1 July 2025
- Zaineldeen, Usama; Aish, Adnan (2012). "Geology, geomorphology and hydrology of the Wadi Gaza catchment, Gaza Strip, Palestine". Journal of African Earth Sciences. 76: 1–7. Bibcode:2012JAfES..76....1Z. doi:10.1016/j.jafrearsci.2012.07.005.
