= Al-Moghraqa =

Archaeological site in Palestine

- Al-Moghraqa during the 2000 excavations

- Shown within Palestine
- 31°28′21″N 34°24′56″E
- Type: Settlement
- Location: Al-Mughraqa, Gaza Governorate, Gaza Strip, Palestine

History
- Built: Middle Bronze Age (early 2nd millennium BC)

Site notes
- Area: 15 hectares (37 acres)
- Excavation dates: 2000
- Discovered: 1996

Al-Moghraqa is a Bronze Age former settlement in Gaza Governorate of the Gaza Strip in Palestine. It was discovered in 1996 in the town of Al-Mughraqa and investigated in 1999 and 2000 as part of the Gaza Research Project. The site was inhabited in the early 2nd millennium BC, and may have been associated with the nearby settlement of Tell el-Ajjul, which was inhabited at around the same time.

== Location and topography ==
When al-Moghraqa was discovered in 1996, it was located in a mixed environment combining agricultural land and sand dunes. It covered an estimated 15 hectares (37 acres). It was established on low-lying ground.

== History ==
Archaeologists identified three phases of occupation at al-Moghraqa, all dated to the Middle Bronze Age (periods MBA IIb-c) – the early part of the 2nd millennium BC. The date was arrived at based on the artefacts discovered at the site. This period in the Levant was characterised by the development of new societal organisation, with centralised fortified settlements and satellite villages.

Al-Moghraqa was inhabited at approximately the same time as Tell el-Ajjul, and the two sites were less than 1 kilometre (0.62 mi) apart. The proximity of the two sites led the archaeologists who investigated Tell al-Moghraq to suggest that it may have been a "satellite settlement" of Tell el-Ajjul. Gaza and its surrounding area were part of the New Kingdom of Egypt in the 2nd millennium BC. The settlement was economically and militarily important, connecting Egypt to Asia. After the settlement was abandoned, the area was used agriculturally and later covered by sand dunes.

== Discovery and investigation ==
Moain Sadeq, the director of the Department of Antiquities in Gaza, identified Al-Moghraqa in 1996 when building work removed sand dunes obscuring the site. The site was subsequently surveyed as part of the Gaza Research Project in 1999, with limited excavations following in 2000. Further investigations were planned but were suspended due to the outbreak of the Second Intifada. The area was used agriculturally, and in late 2023, the Gaza Maritime Archaeological Project documented clearances and demolition in the locality of al-Moghraqa and Tell el-Ajjul.

Artefacts recovered from al-Moghraqa were similar to funerary objects found at Tell el-Ajjul, leading the archaeologists investigating the site to suggest that it could have been used as a cemetery. Survey work identified two concentrations of activity (designated Site 1 and Site 2) that most likely constituted a single site. Artefacts found at al-Moghraqa include pieces of terracotta funerary cones with stamps from the reign of Pharaoh Thutmose III and Hatshepsut. While the cones are unique in the region, they are similar to cones from Egypt dated to the Eighteenth Dynasty of Egypt. Despite parallels from Egypt, the purpose of the cones is uncertain.

== Bronze Age sites near Gaza ==
- Tell Gaza
- Tell el-Ajjul
- Tell es-Sakan
- Deir al-Balah
- Tall Rīdān
- Tell Muntar
- Tall as Sanām

== See also ==
- List of archaeological sites in the Gaza Strip

== Bibliography ==
- Andreou, Georgia M. (2023). Gaza Maritime Archaeology Project (PDF) (Report). Honor Frost Foundation. Archived from the original (PDF) on 23 August 2024.
- Clarke, Joanne; Steel, Louise (1999). "Demographic patterns and differential settlement in the Bronze Age landscape of Palestine". The Landscape of Palestine: Equivocal Poetry (PDF). Birzeit: Birzeit University. pp. 211–231. hdl:20.500.11889/4685.
- Greenberg, Raphael (2019). The Archaeology of the Bronze Age Levant: From Urban Origins to the Demise of City-States, 3700–1000 BCE. Cambridge: Cambridge University Press. doi:10.1017/9781316275993. ISBN 978-1-316-27599-3.
- Sharon, Ilan (2013). "Levantine chronology". The Oxford Handbook of the Archaeology of the Levant. Oxford: Oxford University Press. pp. 44–65. doi:10.1093/oxfordhb/9780199212972.013.004. ISBN 978-0-19-921297-2.
- Steel, Louise; Clarke, Joanne; Sadeq, Moain; Manley, Bill; McCarthy, Andrew; Munro, R. Neil (2004a), "Gaza Research Project. Report on the 1999 and 2000 seasons at al-Moghraqa", Levant, 36: 37–88, doi:10.1179/lev.2004.36.1.37
- Steel, Louise; Manley, Bill; Clarke, Joanne; Sadeq, Moain (2004b). "Egyptian 'Funerary Cones' from El-Moghraqa, Gaza". The Antiquaries Journal. 84: 319–333. doi:10.1017/S0003581500045856.
- Steel, Louise; Manley, Bill; Clarke, Joanne; Sadeq, Moain (2002), "Late Bronze Age Gaza: prestige production at el-Moghraqa", Antiquity, 76 (294): 939–940, doi:10.1017/S0003598X00091663
