= Tell el-Ajjul gold hoards =

Bronze Age Canaanite hoards

Tell el-Ajjul hoards
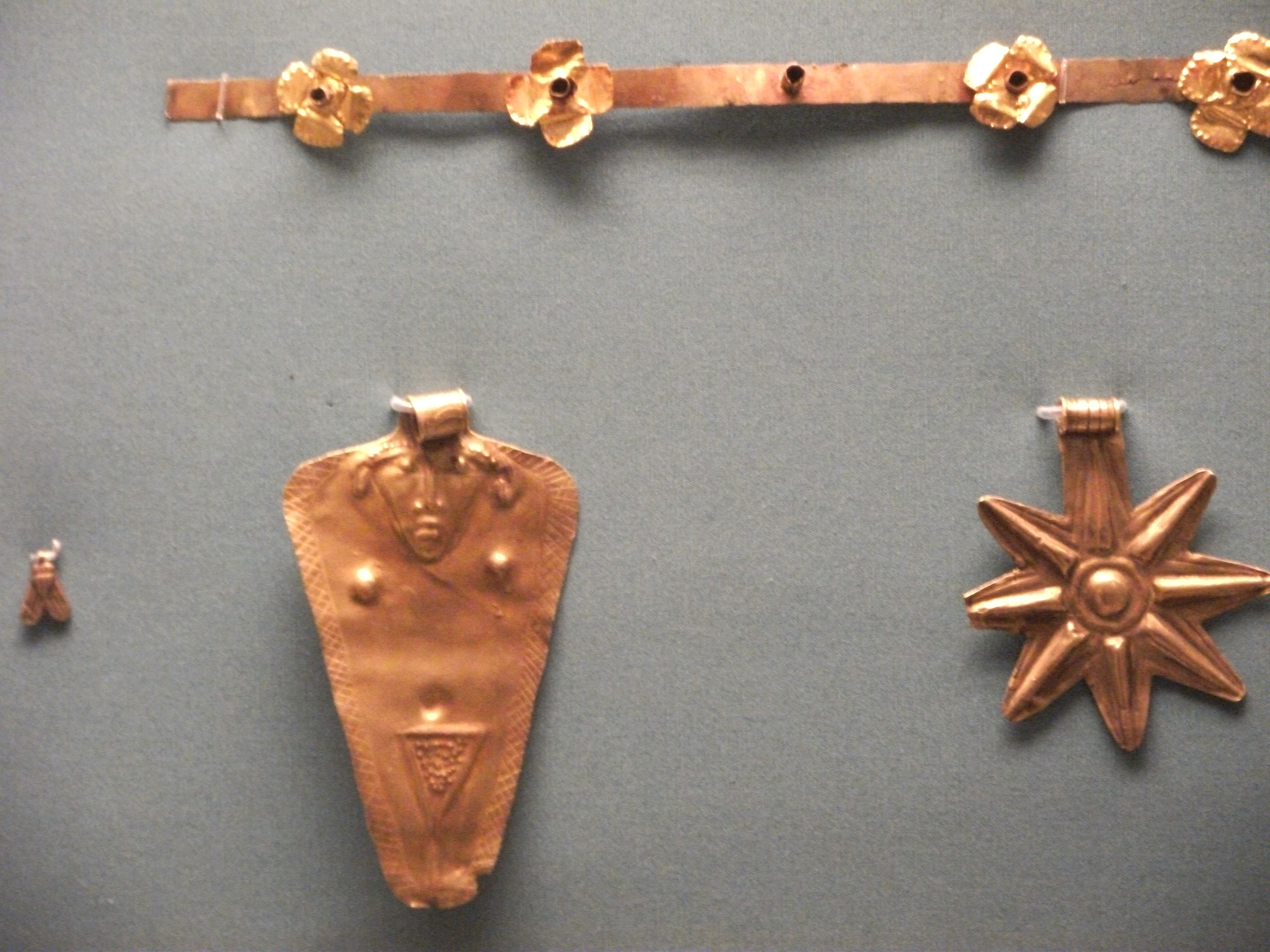
- Part of the hoard on display in the British Museum
- Material: Gold
- Created: 1750–1550 BC
- Discovered: 1933
- Place: Tell el-Ajjul, Palestine
- Present location: British Museum, London
- Registration: 1949,0212.1-35

The Tell el-Ajjul gold hoards are a collection of three hoards of Bronze Age gold jewellery found at the Canaanite site of Tell el-Ajjul in Gaza. Excavated by the British archaeologist Flinders Petrie in the 1930s, the collection is now mostly preserved at the British Museum in London and the Rockefeller Museum in Jerusalem. The treasure ranks amongst the greatest Bronze Age finds in the Levant.

== Discovery ==
During the 1930s, the Egyptologist Sir William Matthews Flinders Petrie led a British archaeological expedition to Tell el-Ajjul, in the expectation that they would discover the remains of an outpost of the Egyptian New Kingdom Empire. In 1933, various pieces of gold jewellery were found on the Tell. In all, five large deposits were unearthed in several buildings on the mound, including the so-called palace. No other site in Israel or Palestine has yielded so many items made in precious metal. The British Museum's share of the treasure was purchased in 1949 from Hilda Petrie, the widow of Flinders Petrie.

The findspot has suffered extensive damage since the outbreak of the Gaza war in October 2023; Tell el-Ajjul was among the archaeological sites the Palestinian Ministry of Tourism and Antiquities reported as damaged or destroyed by Israeli military action in a February 2024 assessment.

== Description ==
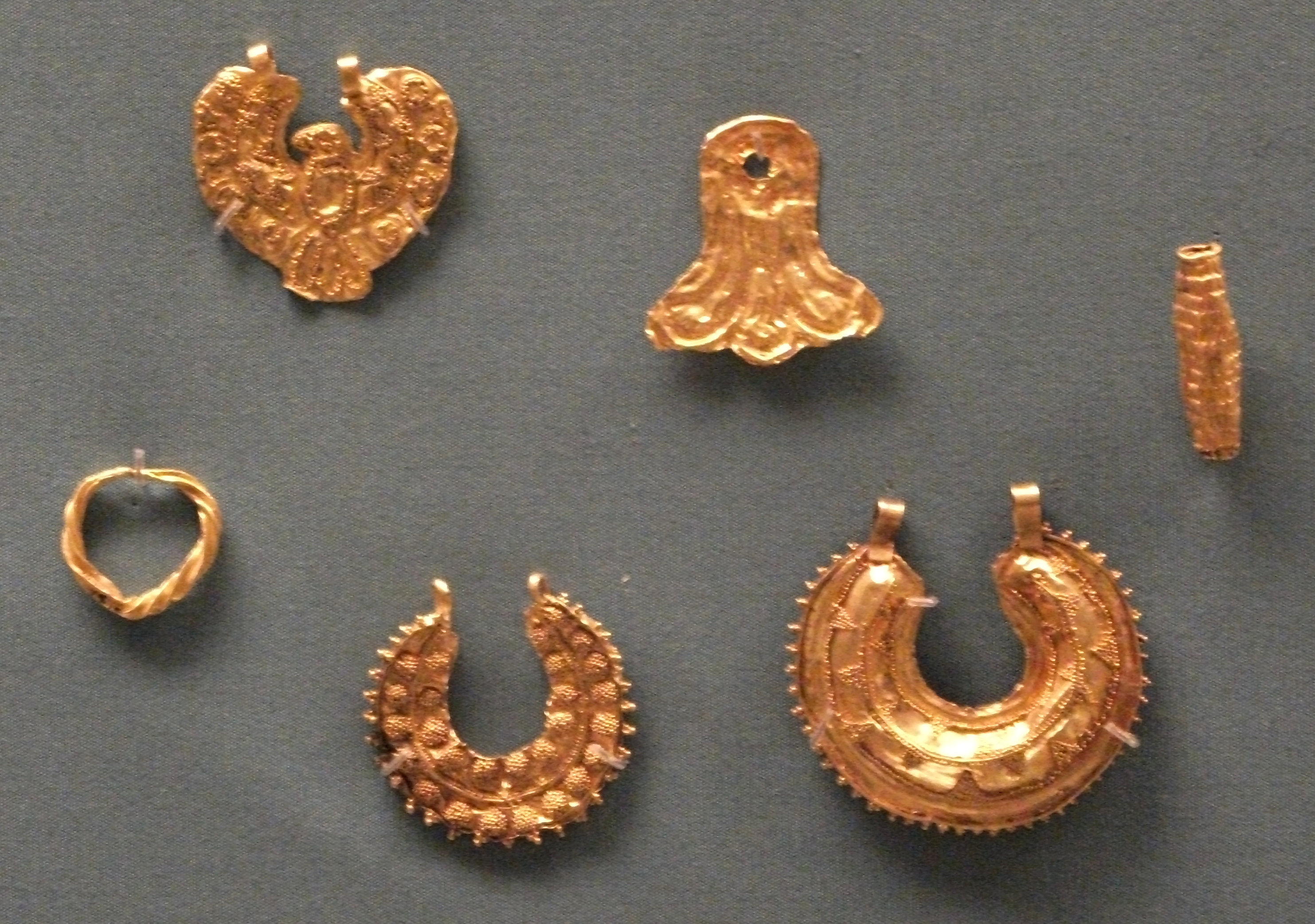
Gold jewellery from the hoard in the British Museum

The jewellery from Ajjul was made almost entirely from gold (both sheet and solid), by casting, hammering or pressing. It must have belonged to a wealthy elite who benefited from the settlement's location on the trade routes between Egypt and the Middle East. Twenty six different types of jewellery have been classified, the principal groups being earrings, circlets, bracelets, beads, Egyptian scarabs and toggle pins. Most are plain ornaments cast from solid gold, although some are decorated with minute gold beads by the granulation process. A few items are in the form of animals such as falcons and flies but the most impressive objects in the hoard are the Egyptian-style pendants of the deity Astarte and gold diadems with quatrefoil florets.

== See also ==
- al-Moghraqa – a Middle Bronze Age settlement less than 1 km from Tell el-Ajjul

== Bibliography ==
- A. Kempinski, 'The Middle Bronze Age' in The archaeology of ancient Israel (New Haven, Yale University Press, 1992)
- J. N. Tubb, Canaanites (London, The British Museum Press, 1998)
