= Tell es-Sanam =

Archaeological site in Palestine

- Tell es-Sannam, Tell al-Sannam, Tall as Sanām
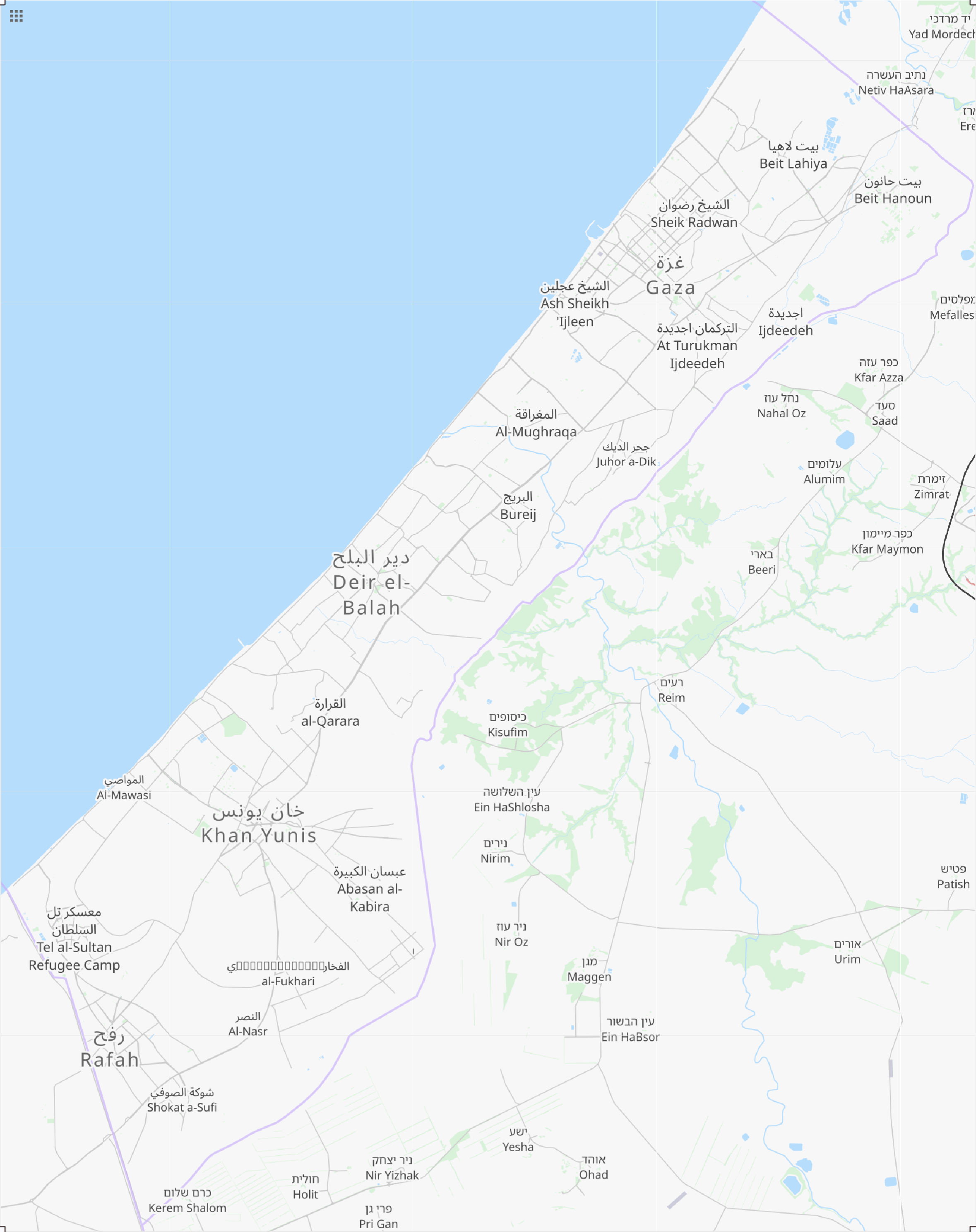
- Location within Gaza Strip Location within State of Palestine
- 31°27′49″N 34°23′03″E
- Periods: Late Bronze Age and Iron Age
- Location: Palestine

Site notes
- Management: Private ownership

Tell es-Sanam is a tell (a mound created by accumulation of debris) near the Mediterranean coast of the Gaza Strip in Palestine. It is located on the bank of the Wadi Ghazzeh, near the point where the watercourse meets the Mediterranean Sea. Archaeologists Joanna Clarke and Louise Steel hypothesise that Tell es-Sanam may have been established in the 2nd millennium BCE as a successor to the Bronze Age settlement at Tell el-Ajjul a short distance away as the Wadi Gazzeh silted up; its position near the sea would have enabled to it function as a port.

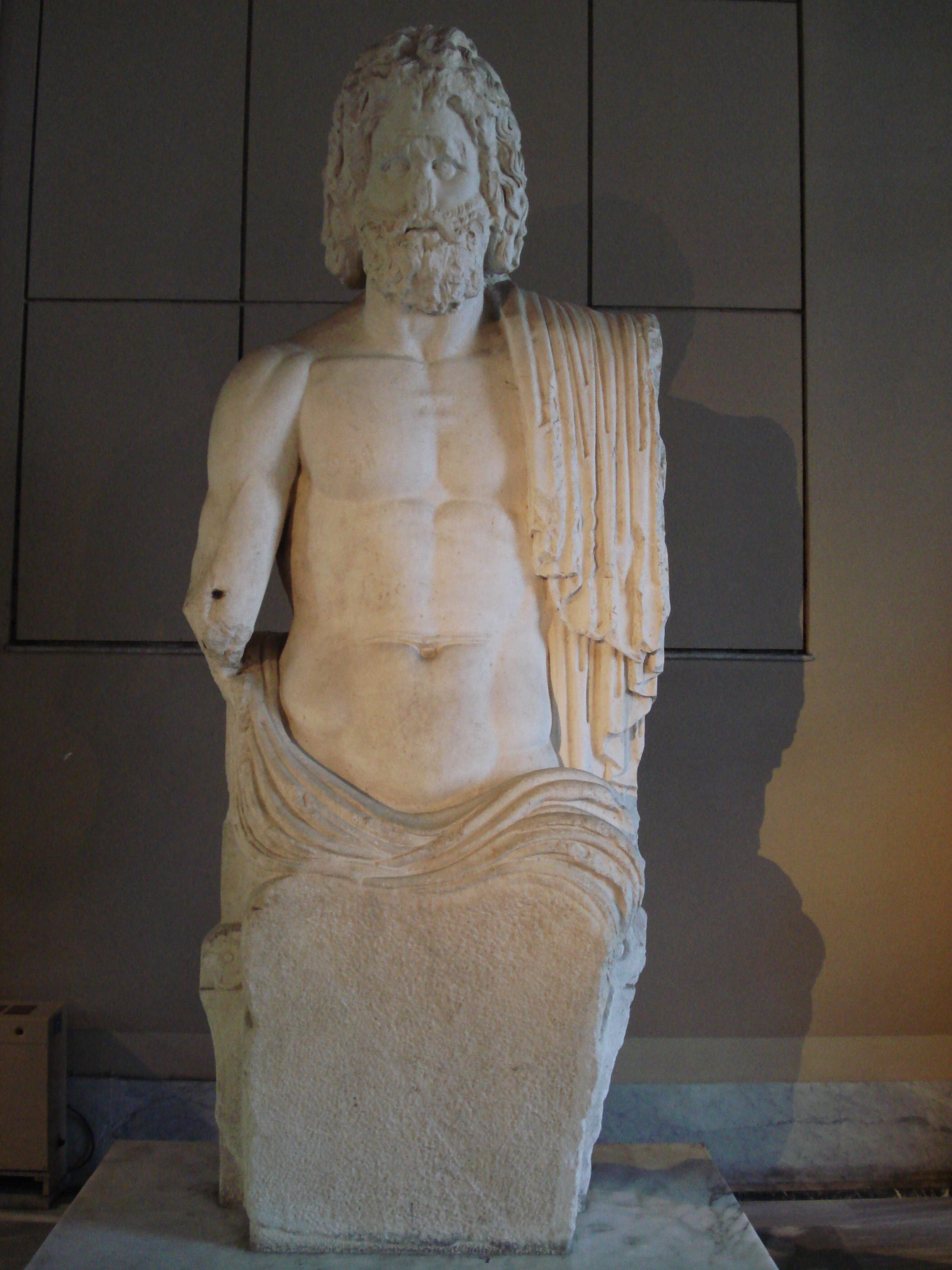
A statue of Zeus found near Gaza and currently in the Istanbul Archaeology Museums

The Gaza Research Project found Iron Age pottery during preliminary investigations, and Eliezer Oren reported finding Late Bronze Age pottery at Tell es-Sanam in the 1970s. Clarke and Steel also suggest that during the Iron Age the settlements at Tell es-Sanam and Tell Ruqeish may have been more important in the region than the settlement at Gaza. Between 2005 and 2014, the area around the archaeological site changed significantly with the construction of industrial buildings and craters nearby from the 2014 Gaza War.

Archaeologist Michael Press writes that a 10 feet (3.0 m) marble statue of Zeus was found at this site in 1879, and not at Tell el-Ajjul as had initially been reported by Claude Reignier Conder, and it is from this discovery that the site gets its current name, which in Arabic means "the mound of the idol". Locals told Gottlieb Schumacher in 1886 that the Zeus statue was found in the site of Tell en Keiz, which appeared on 19th century maps of the Palestine Exploration Fund as Tell Nujeid, and which Alois Musil who visited it had called Tell en-Nuqeid. By the 1920s British survey of Palestine, locals were recorded as using its current name, Tell es-Saman. Archaeologist Felicity Cobbing highlighted the discovery of the statue of Zeus as one of the events that drove interest in Gaza's ancient history and archaeology.

== See also ==
- List of archaeological sites in the Gaza Strip

== Bibliography ==
- Andreou, Georgia M.; Fradley, Michael; Blue, Lucy; Breen, Colin (2024). "Establishing a baseline for the study of maritime cultural heritage in the Gaza Strip". Palestine Exploration Quarterly. 156 (1): 4–42. doi:10.1080/00310328.2022.2037923.
- Centre for Cultural Heritage Preservation (January 2025). Damage and Risk Assessment of Cultural Heritage Under Attack in the Gaza Strip (PDF) (Report). State of Palestine Ministry of Tourism and Antiquities. Archived from the original (PDF) on 2025-07-29.
- Clarke, Joanna; Sadeq, Moain (2004), "Gaza Research Project: 1998 Survey of the Old City of Gaza", Levant, 36: 31–36, doi:10.1179/lev.2004.36.1.31
- Clarke, Joanna; Steel, Louise (1999), "Demographic patterns and differential settlement in the Bronze Age landscape of Palestine" (PDF), The landscape of Palestine: equivocal poetry, pp. 211–231, hdl:20.500.11889/4685
- Clarke, Joanna; Steel, Louise (2000), "Reports: The Gaza Research Project 1998", Palestine Exploration Quarterly, 132 (2): 189–191, doi:10.1179/peq.2000.132.2.189
- Cobbing, Felicity (2025). "Saved Treasures of Gaza – 5000 Years of History From April 3rd to November 2nd, 2025, Institut du Monde Arabe, Paris". Palestine Exploration Quarterly. 157 (3): 272–274. doi:10.1080/00310328.2025.2538980.
- Morhange, Christophe; Hamdan Taha, Mohamed; Humbert, Jean-Baptiste; Marriner, Nick (2005), "Human settlement and coastal change in Gaza since the Bronze Age", Méditerranée, 104 (104): 75–78, doi:10.4000/mediterranee.2252
- Press, Michael (6 September 2016). "A 10-Foot Marble Zeus in Nineteenth-Century Gaza". Archived from the original on 5 December 2021.
