= Tel Hashash =

Archaeological site in Tel Aviv

Tel Hashash or Tell el-Hashash (Hebrew: תל חשאש) is an archaeological site in the heart of the Bavli neighborhood of Tel Aviv. It is one of the ancient sites along the Yarkon River, located 800 meters south of the river, overlooking Tell Qasile on the northern bank of the river. The site was excavated in the 1960s by Jacob Kaplan on behalf of the Old Jaffa Museum of Antiquities, and in the 1980s by Haya Ritter Kaplan of the Israel Antiquities Authority. The excavations exposed remains of the first century CE and the late Byzantine period.

== Excavations ==
In 1953, Jacob Kaplan surveyed the site and found mostly Roman pottery from the 1st century CE as well as Early Bronze Age pottery. Kaplan later excavated the site in 1966 and discovered tombs and pottery from the 1st century BCE to the 1st century CE as well as a structure and tombs from the 4th century CE. In 1980, Haya Ritter-Kaplan excavated the site and discovered a small fortress from the time of Byzantine emperor Heraclius in the early 7th century CE. Ritter Kaplan returned to the site in 1983-1984 and found more Byzantine remains as well as Hellenistic remains including two coins of Ptolemy II Philadelphus (3rd century BCE). In 2014 a salvage excavation was undertaken south of Tel Hashash under the direction of Yitzhak Marmelstein and Amir Gorzalczany. The excavation discovered tombs from the Middle and Late Bronze Age, Hellenistic pottery and an Ottoman well.

== Bibliography ==
- Itamar Taxel (July 2010). "A Re-Appraisal of the Archaeological Findings at Tel Hashash: On the Archaeology of the Yarqon Estuary from Classical Times to Late Antiquity". Palestine Exploration Quarterly. 142 (2): 95–126. doi:10.1179/003103210X12717682047177 – via ResearchGate.
