= Tel Shem =

- Tell esh Shammām
- Shown in Israel
- 32°40′17.3″N 35°09′18.2″E
- Type: Tell
- Periods: Neolithic, Chalcolithic, Bronze Age, Iron Age, Persian, Hellenistic, Roman, Byzantine, Mamluk, Ottoman
- Location: Israel
- Region: Jezreel Valley, Israel

History
- Abandoned: Ottoman period

Site notes
- Excavation dates: 2013
- Archaeologists: Avner Raban; Yotam Tepper
- Condition: Destroyed

Tel Shem (Hebrew: תל שם), or Tell esh Shemmam (Arabic: تل الشمام), is an archaeological site located south of Kfar Yehoshua, in the Jezreel Valley, northern Israel. The Nahalal stream, a tributary of the Kishon River, flows east of the site. The site used to include a tell but it was flattened for agricultural use and it can no longer be seen on the surface. Fragments of building blocks and potsherds can be found scattered on the agricultural fields around the site and are usually exposed after the rain. Residents of Kfar Yehoshua have collected ancient artifacts from the site and put them as decorations in their homes. Those include complete vessels and figurines made of stone and pottery. The site was surveyed by Israeli archaeologist Avner Raban and a salvage excavation took place for the first time in 2013. The studies showed that although small, Tel Shem had human presence through almost every period from the Neolithic until the Byzantine rule, as well as during the Mamluk and Ottoman periods. A station of the old Jezreel Valley railway near Kfar Yehoshua was named after the site which was still visible in the beginning of the 20th century, before it was changed to "Kfar Yehoshua Station".

== Archaeological study ==
When surveyed for the first time, Avner Raban and his team collected flint tools from the Neolithic and Chalcolithic periods. The pottery collected was dated also to the two periods, as well as the Early Bronze Age I-II, Middle Bronze Age II, Late Bronze Age II, all of the Iron Age, the Persian, Hellenistic, Roman, Byzantine and the Ottoman periods. Avner Raban identified Tel Shem as the site of a Philistine or other Sea Peoples settlement thanks to the Philistine pottery and figurines found in the site and in collections in Kfar Yehoshua.

The excavation in 2013, headed by Yotam Tepper on behalf of the Israel Antiquities Authority and funded by the Mekorot water company, investigated six squares and excavated down to groundwater level. The excavation shed further light on the settlement history of Tel Shem. The area investigated was in some parts of history The earliest discovery is a floor made of mortar which was dated thanks to the flint tool found above and below it, to the Chalcolithic period. Six tombs were studied and dated based on the tools found in them to the Late Bronze Age and the Iron Age. These indicate that this was the cemetery area of the settlement during these periods. During the rule of the Achaemenid Empire (Persian period), the purpose of this area changed. A strangely shaped mudbrick structure was found and layers of ash mixed with slags indicate some processing was done here. The purpose of the structure was not determined due to the limitations of the excavation, but thanks to pottery that was imported from the Phoenician coast (modern-day Lebanon) and was found in the structure, the excavators dated this structure to the Persian period. The next remains are from the Byzantine period, as remains of earlier periods were not unearthed during the excavation. A Byzantine structure made of ashlar blocks with a white mosaic floor was found and seemed to have some kind of a bench attached to its inner southern wall. The pottery found inside included imported bowls and roof tiles.

Although no tomb was found, archaeologists speculate this structure was part of a burial site. The excavation shed light on a settlement that existed during the Mamluk period. A mudbrick installation was found, with its floor sloping slightly to the east. Also, a burial with pottery of that period was found next to the installation. The excavation discovered the remains of structures from the Ottoman Period but their shape and size could not be determined due to the limitation of the excavation. Tobacco pipes, pottery and glass of the Ottoman period were discovered as well as four burials who might be of the same period.
