= Pierre de Miroschedji =

French archaeologist (born 1944)

Pierre de Miroschedji (born 1944) is a French archaeologist. He was director of the French Research Center in Jerusalem between December 2004 and September 2008, and a member of the French National Centre for Scientific Research (CNRS) between 1970 and 2015, first as a research associate, later as a research director.

Miroschedji directed the initial excavation of Tel Yarmuth, an ancient Near East archaeological site 25 km southwest of Jerusalem, near modern Beit Shemesh.
