= Louise Steel (archaeologist) =

British archaeologist

- Known for: Research on Cyprus and Eastern Mediterranean prehistory Director of excavations at Arediou Vouppes, Cyprus
- Title: Professor of Near Eastern Archaeology

Academic background
- Education: University of Liverpool (B.A., 1988); University College London (Ph.D., 1993)
- Thesis: Burial Customs in Cyprus at the Transition from the Bronze Age to the Iron Age (1993)

Louise Steel is Professor of Near Eastern Archaeology at the University of Wales Trinity St David. Her research focuses on the prehistoric Mediterranean world, in particular Cyprus and the Eastern Mediterranean, as well as on themes of materiality and the human body. She conducts fieldwork in Cyprus at the Late Bronze Age site of Arediou Vouppes.

== Academic career ==
Louise Steel studied Archaeology of the East Mediterranean at the University of Liverpool, graduating in 1988, and was awarded her PhD from University College London in 1993; her thesis was entitled "Burial Customs in Cyprus at the Transition from the Bronze Age to the Iron Age". She has worked at the University of Reading, the University of Edinburgh (as a British Academy Postdoctoral Fellow, 1995–1998), and as acting director of the British School of Archaeology in Jerusalem, now the Kenyon Institute (1998–2000). She began working at the University of Lampeter, now part of the University of Wales Trinity Saint David in 2000, and was promoted to Professor during the 2021–22 academic year.

Steel directed an archaeological excavation and survey project at Arediou Vouppes, a Late Bronze Age rural settlement in Cyprus whose main occupation dates to the 13th century BCE, from 2004 to 2013. Arediou Vouppes' economic function may have been to produce agricultural surpluses to support nearby copper mining settlements. The project also promoted engagement with archaeology by members of the local community through collaboration with local authorities, creating teaching materials for use in the local school, and conducting oral history interviews.

== Publications ==
- Louise Steel & Luci Attala (eds). 2019. Body Matters: Exploring the Materiality of the Human Body. Cardiff: University of Wales Press.
- Louise Steel & Katharina Zinn (eds). 2017. Exploring the Materiality of Food"stuffs": Transformations, Symbolic Consumption and Embodiments. New York; London: Routledge.
- Louise Steel. 2012. Materiality and Consumption in the Bronze Age Mediterranean. New York; London: Routledge.
- Louise Steel. 2004. Cyprus Before History. From the Earliest Settlers to the End of the Bronze Age. London: Duckworth Publishing
