= Saved Treasures of Gaza: 5000 Years of History =

2025 exhibition of Palestinian artefacts in Paris

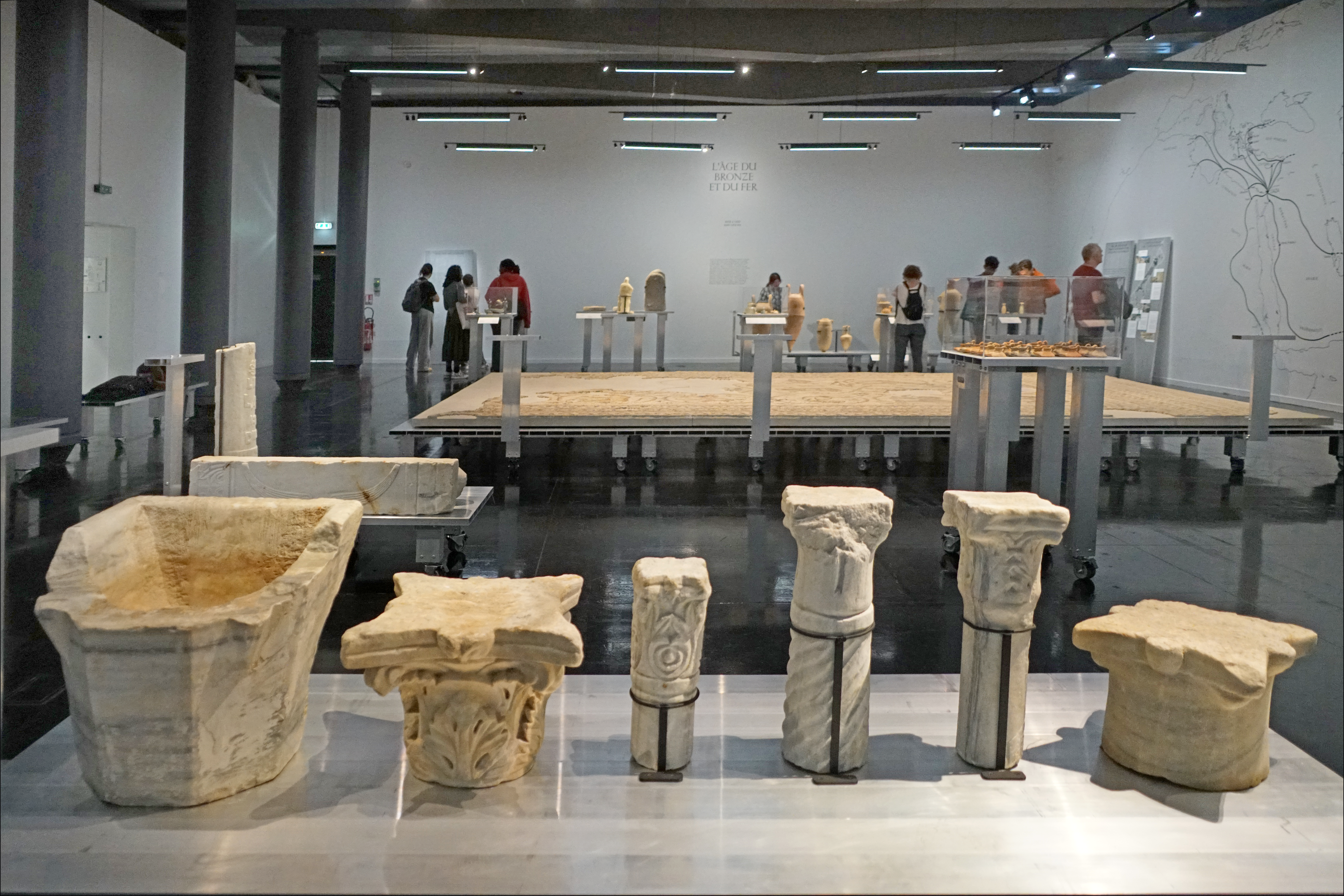
- The first room of the exhibition with architectural fragments in the foreground
- Date: 3 April – 7 December 2025
- Venue: Institut du monde arabe, Paris, France
- Type: Exhibition
- Theme: Archaeology of Gaza
- Curator: Elodie Bouffard
- Website: imarabe.org/fr/agenda/expositions-musee/tresors-sauves-gaza-5000-ans-histoire

Saved Treasures of Gaza: 5000 Years of History (French: Trésors sauvés de Gaza: 5000 ans d'histoire) was an exhibition of archaeological artefacts discovered in the Gaza Strip in Palestine. It was held at the Institut du monde arabe (IMA) in Paris from 3 April to 7 December 2025. The IMA organised the exhibition to highlight Gaza's history and the heritage threatened by the Gaza war along with the damage already caused to heritage sites.

Elodie Bouffard curated Saved Treasures of Gaza which featured 130 artefacts dating from the Early Bronze Age to the Ottoman period. They were a mixture of items recovered through Palestinian-led archaeological excavations and discoveries during building works; the latter were part of Jawdat Khoudary's private collection. Saved Treasures of Gaza included artefacts that were previously in an exhibition in 2000 at the IMA, and which could not be returned to Gaza due to the Israeli–Palestinian conflict. These artefacts were also exhibited at the Musée d'Art et d'Histoire in Geneva in 2007 and 2024. The new exhibition included additional artefacts excavated after the earlier presentations. Bouffard and the archaeologist René Elter co-edited the exhibition catalogue which was published in French. Saved Treasures of Gaza was due to end in November 2025 but was extended by a month due to public interest.

== Background ==
=== Archaeology in Gaza ===
The area of Gaza has been inhabited since the Bronze Age; thousands of years of activity have left hundreds of heritage sites including historic buildings (religious and secular), archaeological sites, cemeteries, and a museum. The Palestinian Department of Antiquities and Cultural Heritage was established in 1994, taking responsibility for archaeological investigations in Palestine; it later became part of the Ministry of Tourism and Antiquities. The department collaborated internationally to undertake excavations, including work in the Gaza Strip at Tell es-Sakan, Tell Umm el-'Amr, and Anthedon. Numerous rescue excavations were also carried out at sites such as the Byzantine Church of Jabalia.

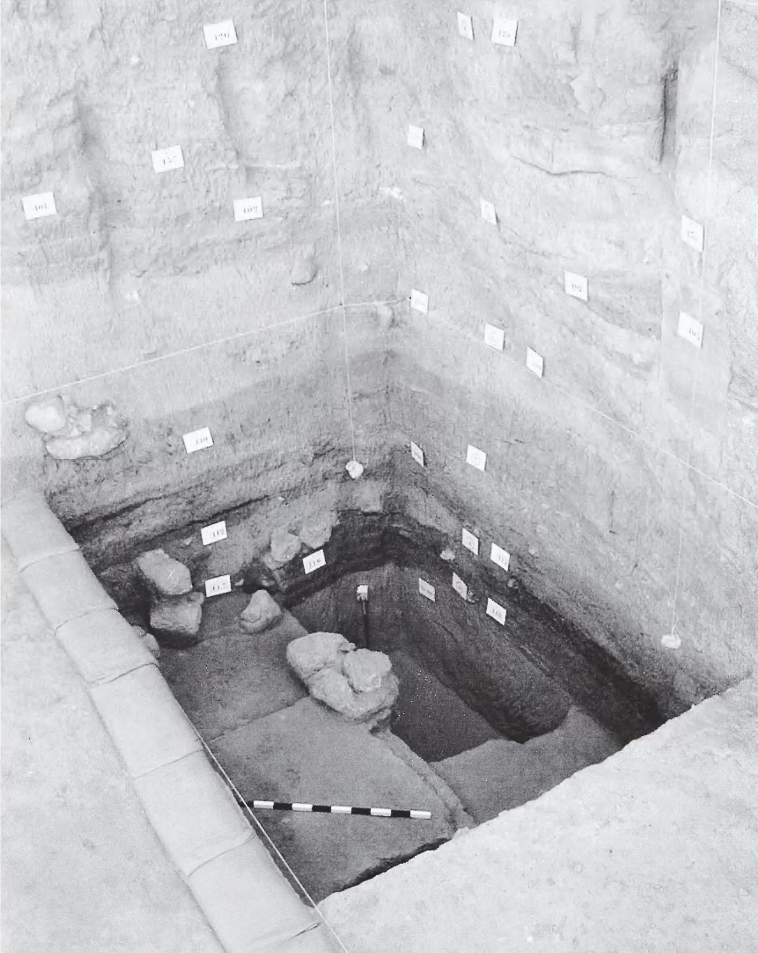
Excavations at Tell es-Sakan in 1999 produced some of the finds on display in the exhibition.

Archaeological sites in the Gaza Strip have been discovered during building work, but there is no requirement in the territory to preserve archaeological finds under Palestinian law. Property developer Jawdat Khoudary established a private collection at the Al Mat'haf Museum to showcase finds from building sites and retrieved off Gaza's coast. Describing his approach to preserving Gaza's heritage in a BBC interview, Jawdat said "I know all the operators of shovels who excavate, so I convinced them, if you find a piece of marble or pottery, don't destroy it, keep it in a good condition and give it to me and I will give you an allowance. They thought that I am a little bit crazy looking for pottery and stones, but day by day we convinced them that it's our history."

=== Exhibitions of archaeology from Palestine ===
In 2000, the Institut du monde arabe (IMA) hosted Mediterranean Gaza, an exhibition of 221 artefacts discovered in Gaza. The items were selected by Moain Sadeq and Jean-Baptiste Humbert who led some of the excavations in the Gaza Strip. The exhibition was touring France when the Second Intifada broke out. Leila Shahid, the Ambassador of Palestine to France, arranged for the artefacts to be stored in Paris. The artefacts remained in Paris until they were relocated to the Musée d'Art et d'Histoire (MAH) in Geneva for a 2007 public exhibition titled Gaza at the Crossroads of Civilizations. The collection was intended to return to Gaza afterwards where it would form the core of a new museum with support from UNESCO and several Swiss institutions including the MAH. Hamas' control of the Gaza Strip from 2007 meant that the vision for the museum was not realised and the artefacts could not be returned as Israel and Egypt blockaded the Gaza Strip.

Over half of the items stored in Geneva came from Khoudary's private collection. The artefacts remained in storage there until 2024 when 44 were showcased in an exhibition at the MAH curated by Beatrice Blandin, Patrimony in Peril (French: Patrimoine en péril). It was organised to mark the 70th anniversary of the Hague Convention for the Protection of Cultural Property in the Event of Armed Conflict. Hundreds of heritage sites in the Gaza Strip have been damaged or destroyed since October 2023 as a result of the Gaza war. The parts of Khoudary's collection that remained in Gaza are presumed lost in the destruction.

== Preparation and launch ==
The IMA had previously held exhibitions related to Palestine including What Palestine Brings to the World in 2023, which showcased the work of Palestinian artists. In 2024, the IMA was preparing for a planned exhibition on Byblos in Lebanon. Escalations in the Israel–Hezbollah conflict prevented artefacts in Lebanon from being moved outside the country, meaning the exhibition could no longer go ahead. Instead, the IMA chose to create an exhibition using artefacts from Gaza that had previously been displayed at the IMA and were in storage in Geneva. The late cancellation of the Byblos exhibition left the IMA with four and a half months to arrange, which was unprecedented for the organisation. Items excavated since the 2007 exhibition were included.

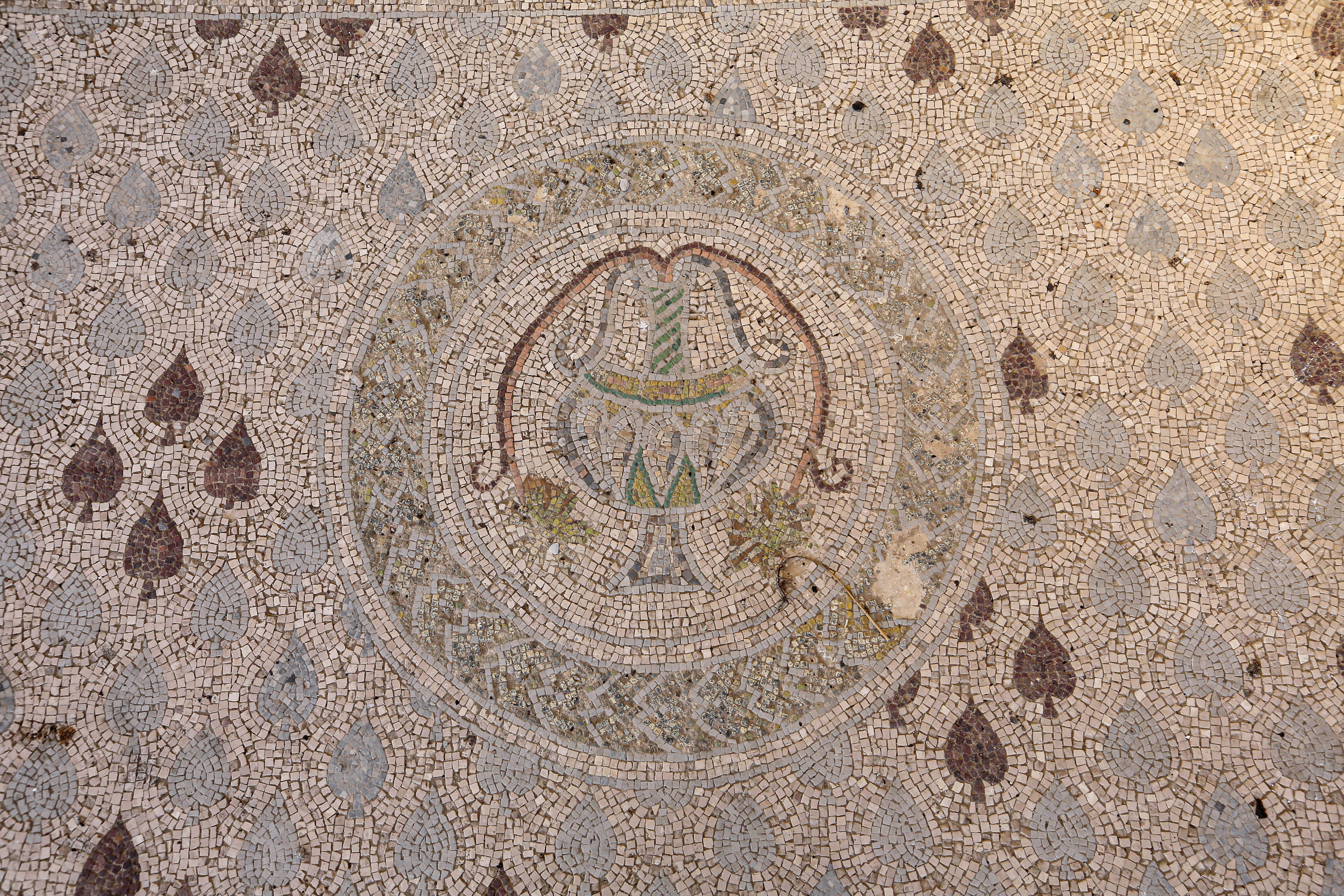
Events around the exhibition included a workshop to create a replica of a 6th-century mosaic (pictured) from Tell Umm el-Amr.

Elodie Bouffard, a staff member at the IMA, curated the exhibition's content, and Palestinian designers and architects Elias and Youssef Anastas designed the exhibition. Studio Folder was responsible for graphic design and Studio Gelactic designed the lighting. Bouffard said "We also wanted to show that Gaza was, for millennia, the culmination of the caravan route, a port that minted its currency and that had developed because it was at the meeting point of water and sand". (Note: French: "on a voulu aussi montrer que Gaza a été, pendant des millénaires, l’aboutissement de la route des caravanes, un port qui frappait sa monnaie et qui s’était développé parce qu’il était à la rencontre de l’eau et du sable") The IMA worked with the MAH in Geneva, Palestine's Ministry of Tourism and Antiquities, the École biblique et archéologique française de Jérusalem, and the International Alliance for the Protection of Heritage (ALIPH). The IMA organised a programme to complement Saved Treasures of Gaza including events for teachers and groups. The events included a workshop in which 80 people contributed to a reproduction of part of a 6th-century mosaic from Tell Umm el-'Amr. Jack Lang, the IMA's president, described the exhibition as an act of resistance. The exhibition ran from 3 April to 2 November 2025.

== Exhibits ==
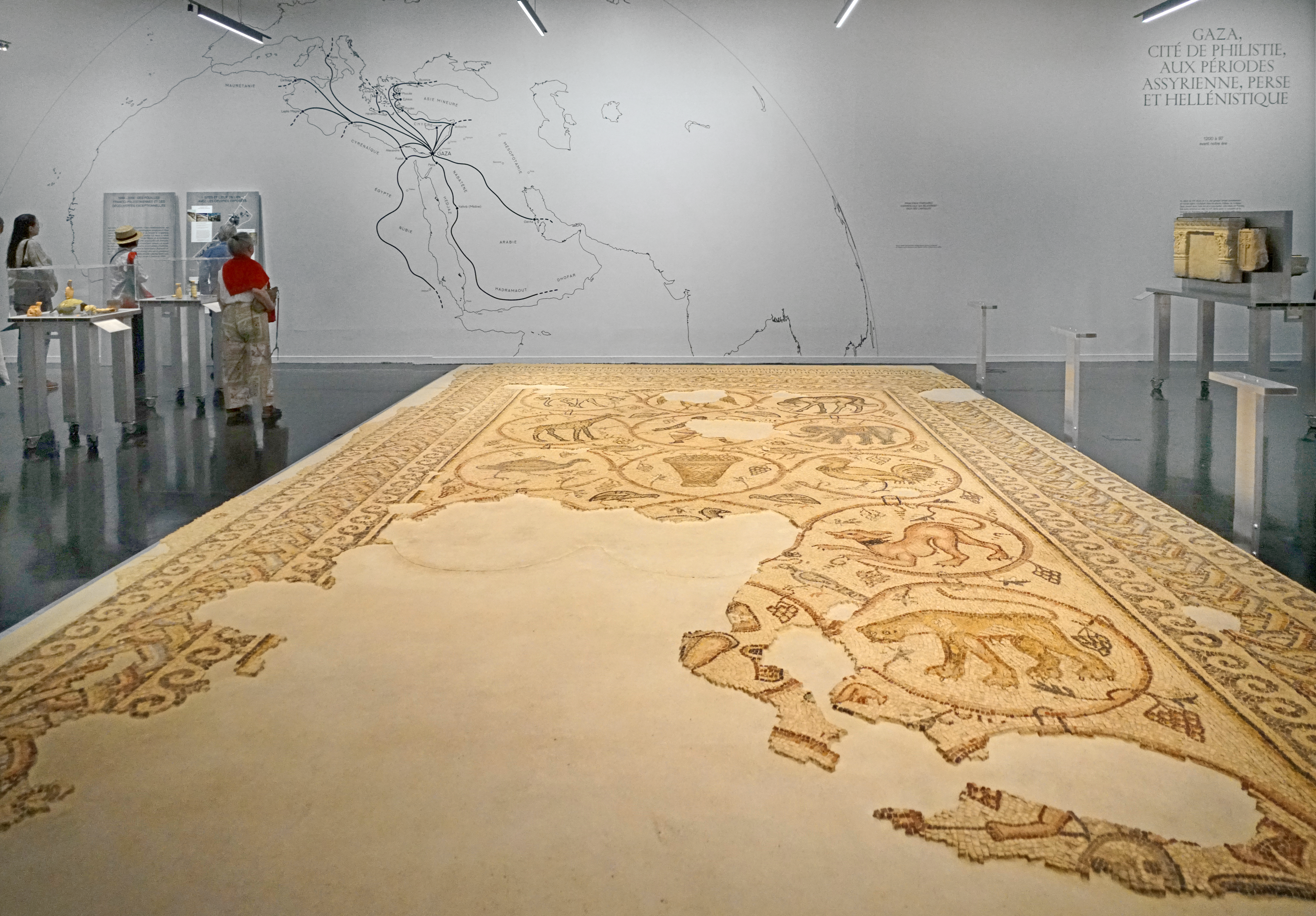
A 6th-century mosaic from a Byzantine church in Abu Baraqeh was at the centre of the first room.

The exhibition spanned three rooms: the first contained artefacts from Gaza, leading to a second room with historic and contemporary photographs showing the impact of the Gaza war; while the third room contained digital reconstructions of Saint Hilarion Monastery and the Byzantine Church of Jabalia. The exhibition had a utilitarian design, and was housed in a space with blue-grey walls and striplighting which in the view of the archaeologist and historian Josephine Quinn evoked a sense of exile. The designers' intention was to reference that the objects had spent nearly two decades in storage. Some interpretative text was printed on the walls, along with a map of Gaza and its connections to the ancient world, while objects were accompanied with short labels written in French.

The first room displayed artefacts arranged around a Byzantine mosaic from Abu Baraqeh in Deir al-Balah. The collection was arranged chronologically around the walls, beginning with the Early Bronze Age. The exhibition consisted of 130 archaeological artefacts, which spanned 5,000 years with the most recent items dating from the 19th century. They included architectural fragments and portable material culture, such as lamps and amphorae. The oldest artefact in the exhibition was a carved stone frog discovered at Tell es-Sakan; it dates to the late 4th millennium BCE during the Early Bronze Age when the region was under the control of Pre-Dynastic Egypt. Egyptian rule was followed by periods of Canaanite, Philistine, Neo-Assyrian, and Babylonian control in the Iron Age.

Bronze Age and Iron Age artefacts

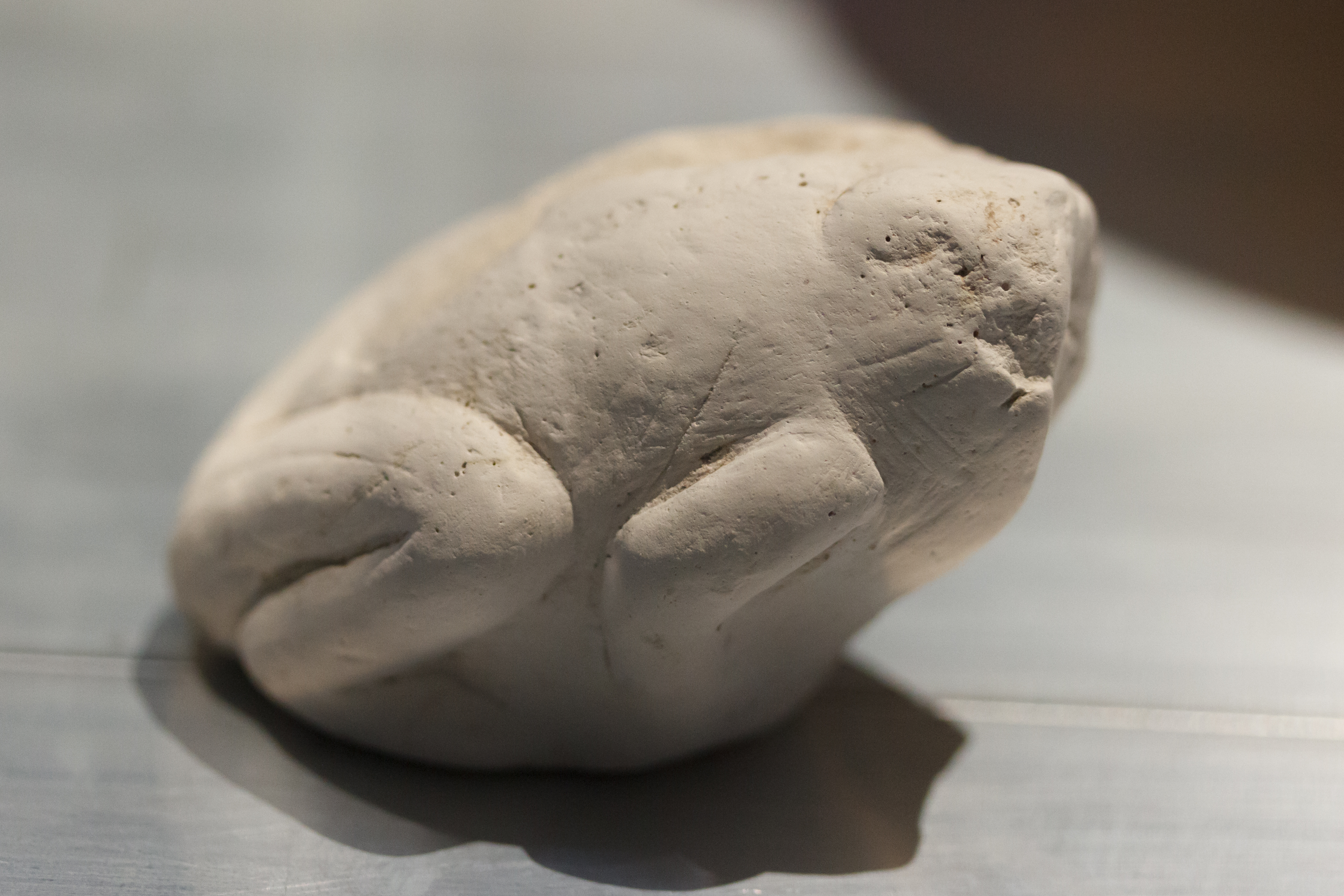
A carved stone frog discovered at Tell es-Sakan, 4th millennium BCE

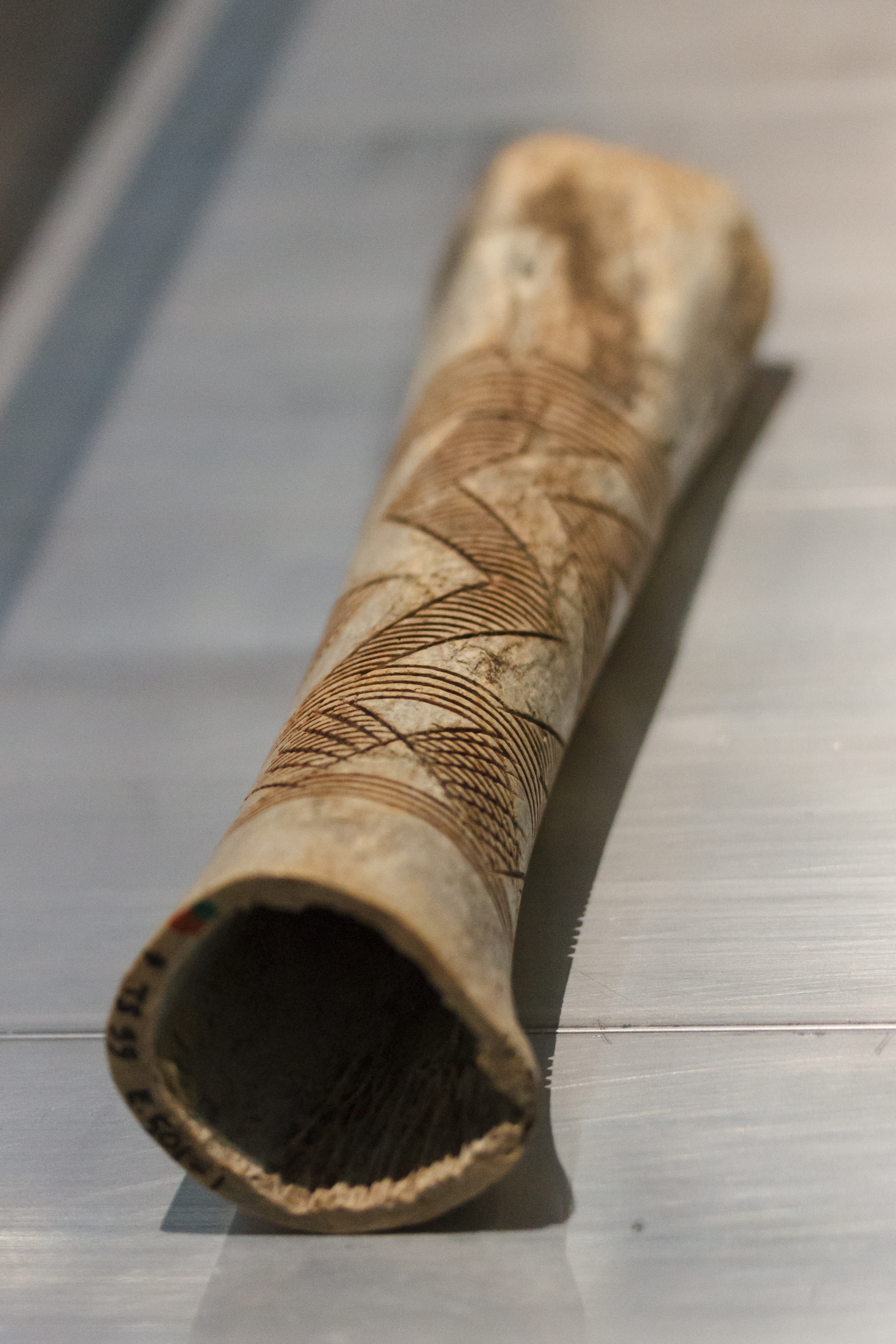
A bone handle found at Tell es-Sakan, mid 3rd millennium BCE

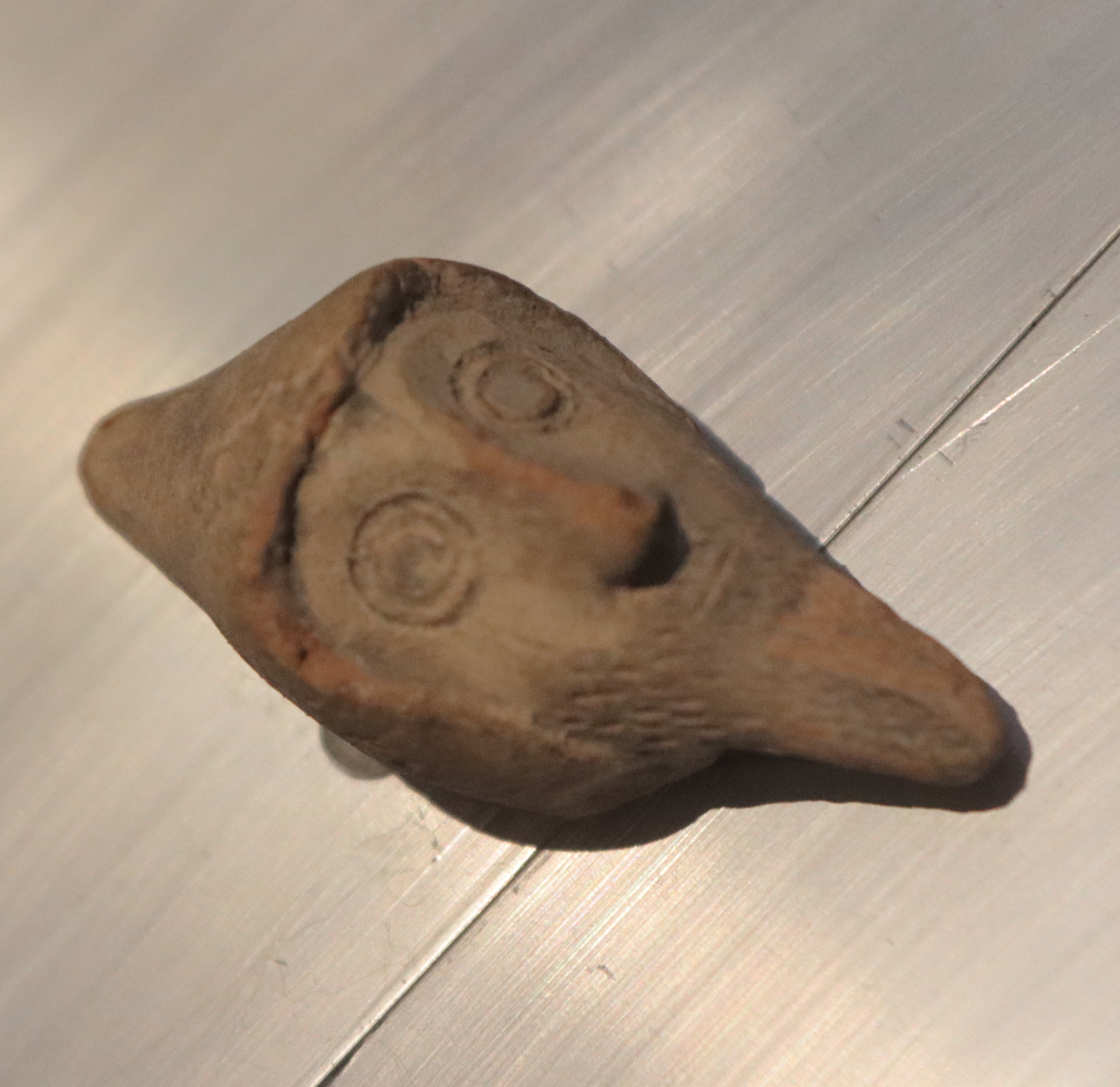
A 6th- or 5th-century BC figurine, possibly Persian, found in Khan Yunis

Following the destructive siege of Gaza in 332 BCE, the city came under Hellenistic and later Roman influence, and was substantially rebuilt by each. The display included a 48-centimetre (19 in) tall marble statuette of the Greek goddess Aphrodite or Hecate; it dated from the Hellenistic or Roman period and was found in the sea by a fisherman. From the 1st century CE, Gaza became a centre for the production and export of wine, and several examples of Gaza amphorae were included in the exhibition in a section titled "Amphorae and the wine of Gaza". The larger exhibits post-dated Gaza's Roman period, with the Byzantine mosaic at the centre of the exhibition and architectural fragments from later periods.

Artefacts from Classical Antiquity and Late Antiquity

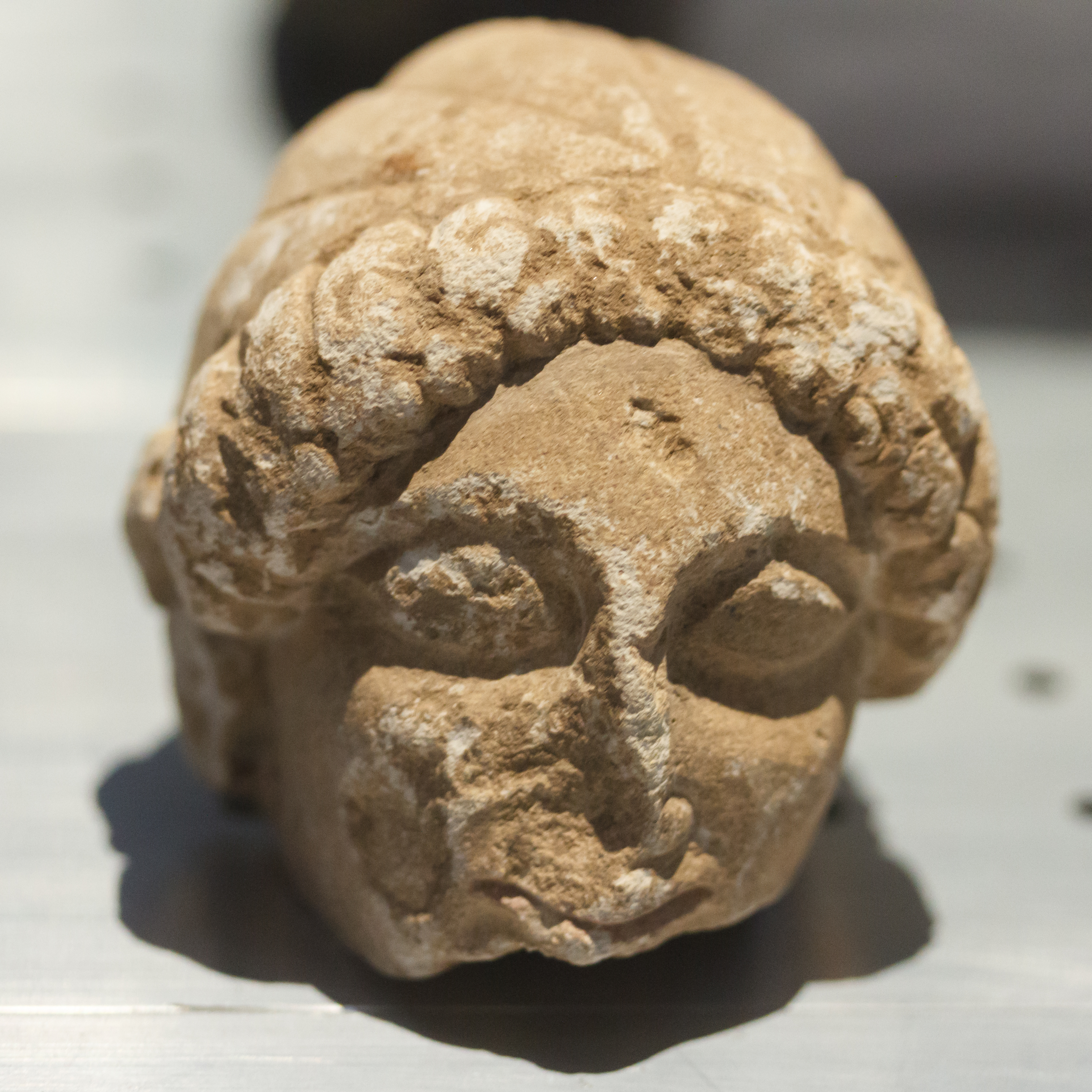
The head of a Hellenistic statue (400–101 BCE) found at Anthedon

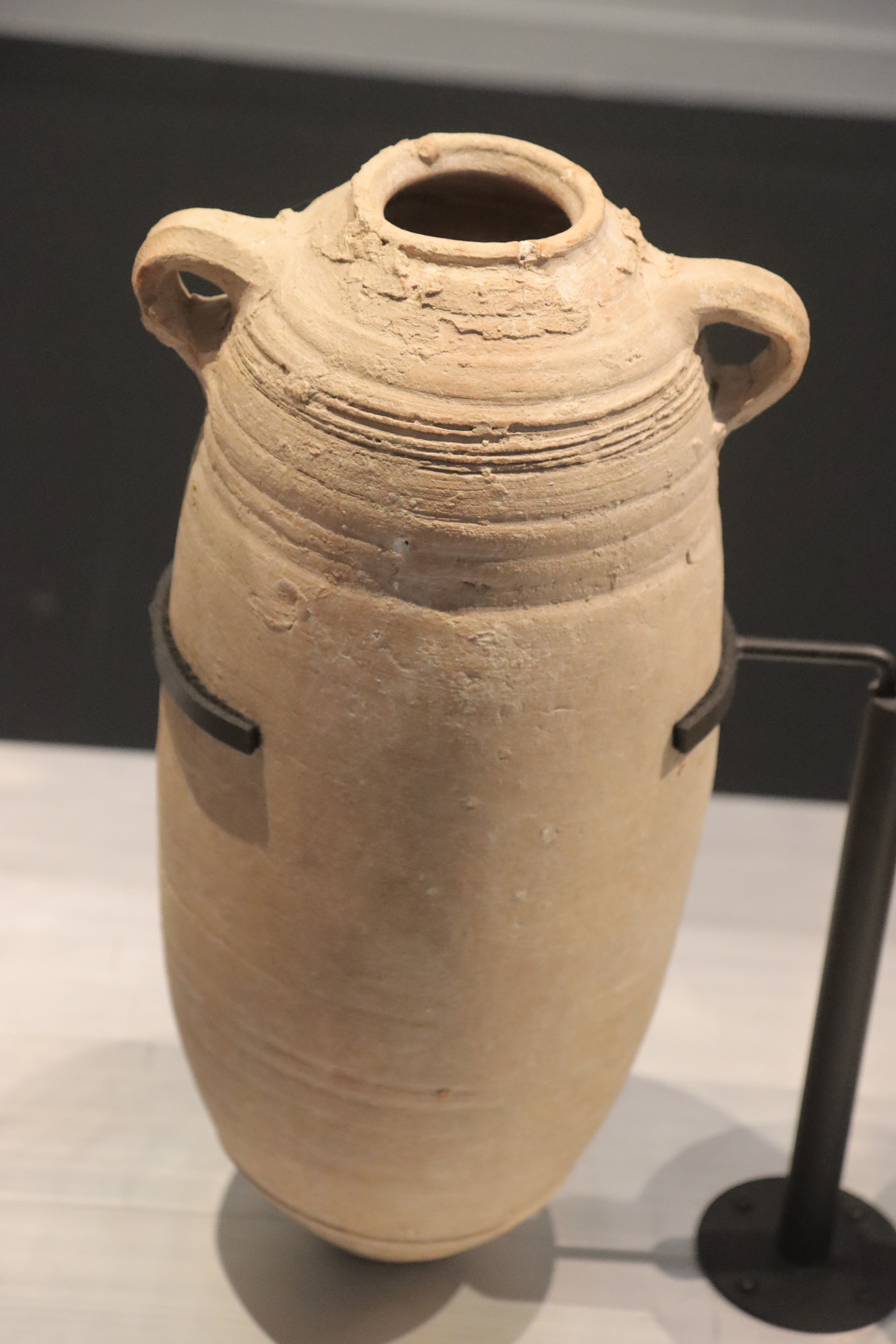
Gaza amphorae are distinguished by their short necks.

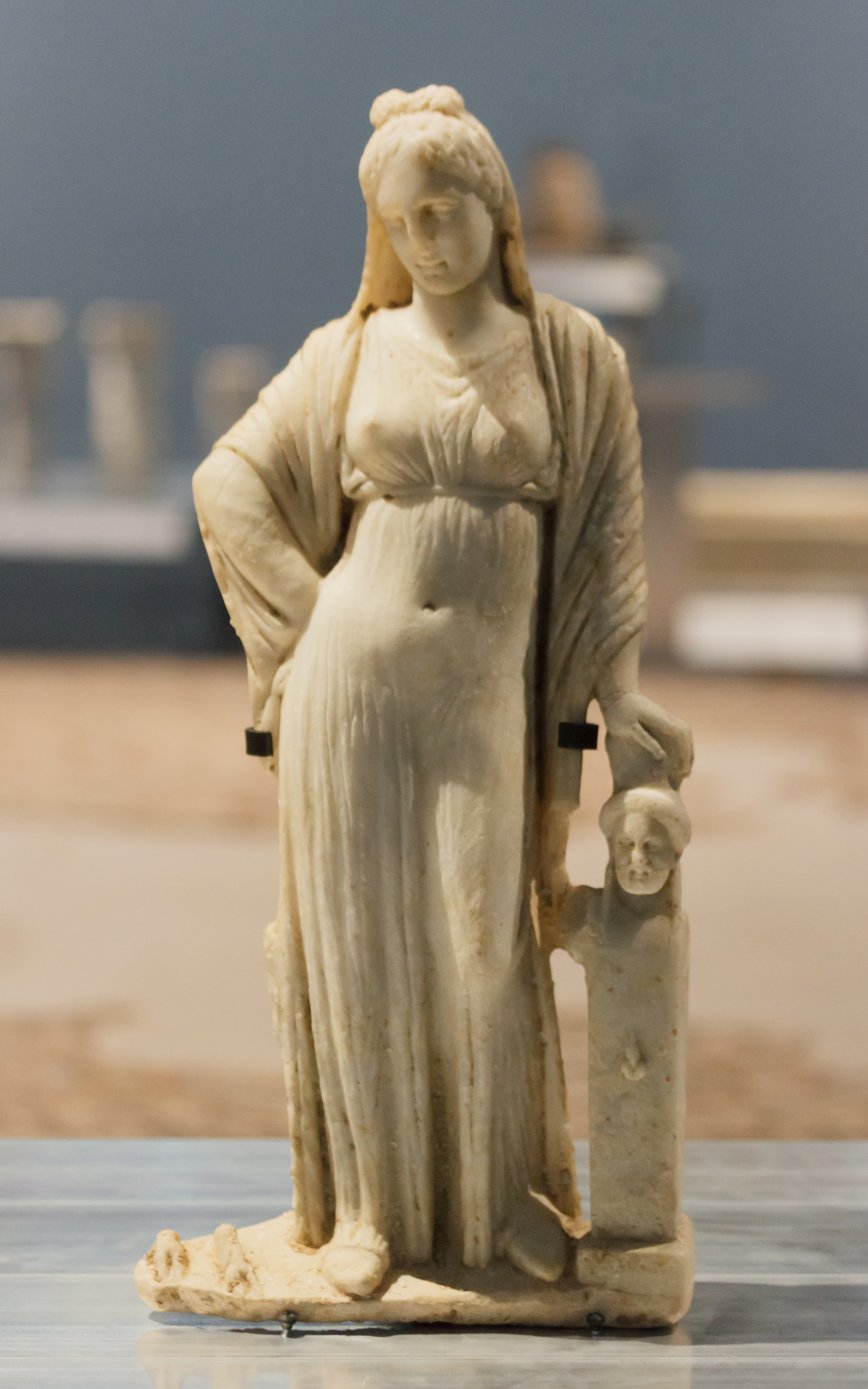
A statuette of Aphrodite or Hecate leaning on a herm found at Anthedon

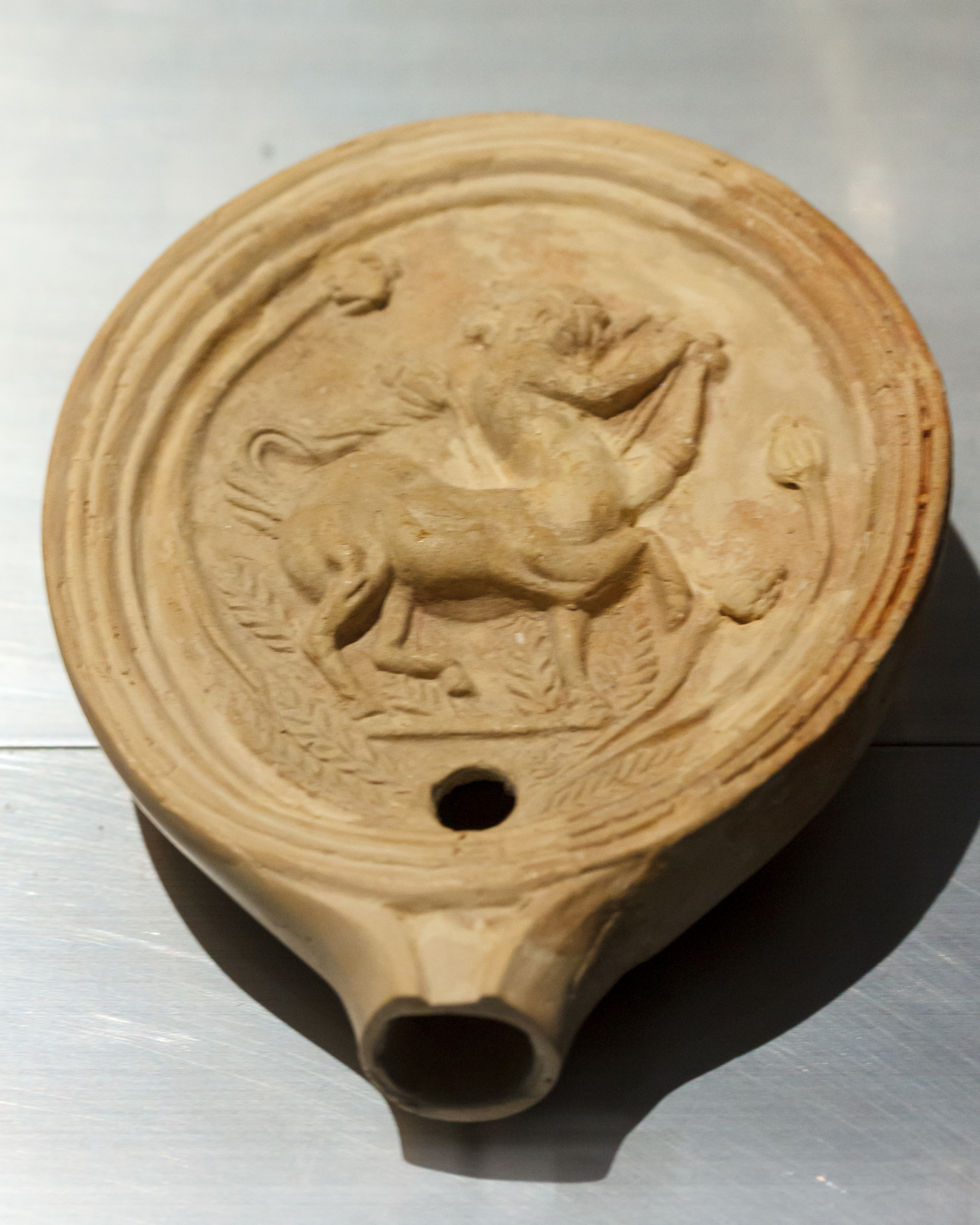
Roman oil lamp (2nd–4th century)

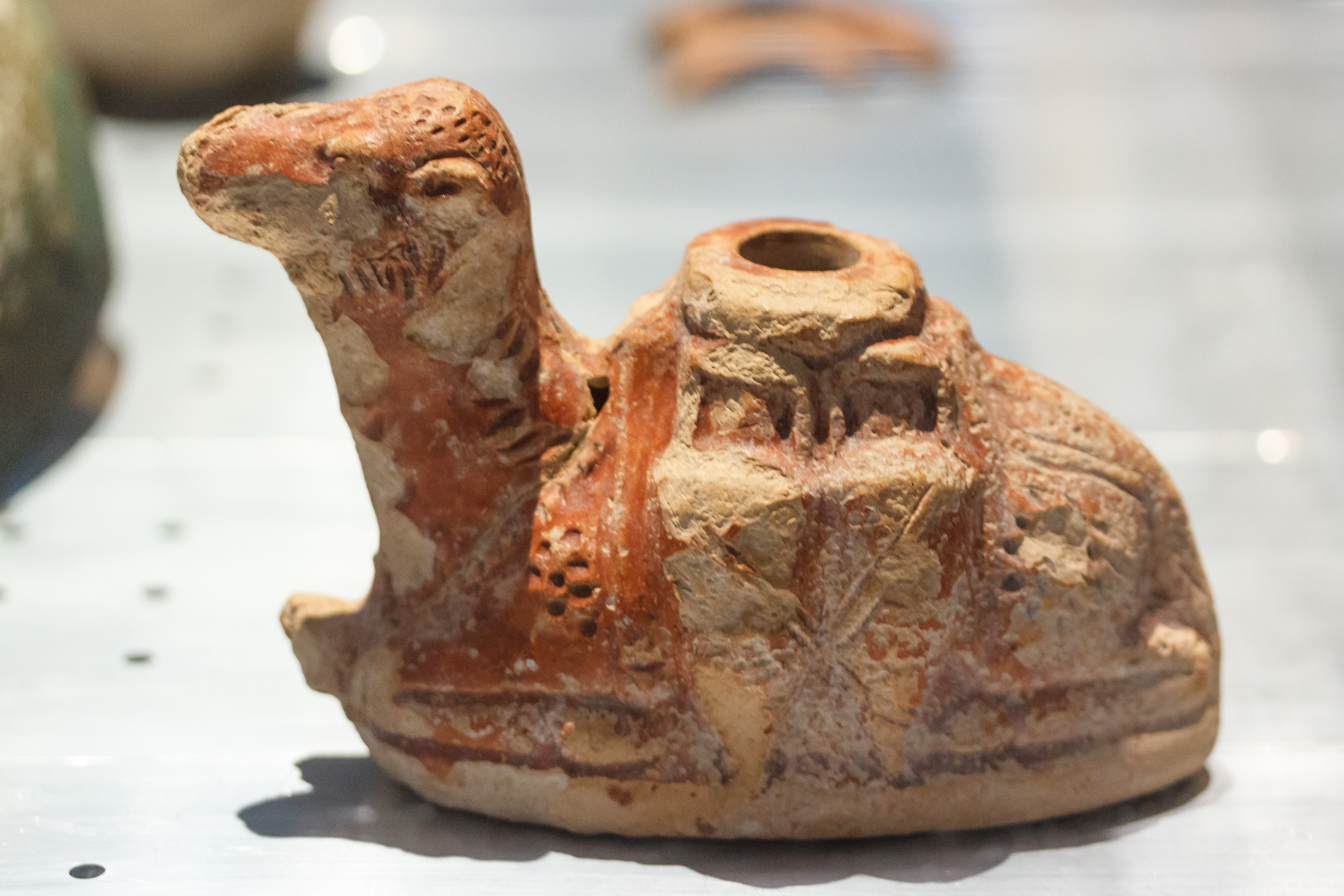
6th-century dromedary flacon found at Anthedon

A selection of coins from different eras – including a hoard of 20,000 from the 4th century, most of which were fused together – was used to illustrate Gaza's trading connections. The Islamic period which began in 633 saw Gaza's importance as a centre of trade continue, and the sociologist Abaher El-Sakka described the Mamluk period from 1250 to 1516 as a 'golden age' for the city. The exhibition included several funerary stele with Arabic inscriptions spanning the Abbasid to Ottoman periods. Ottoman rule from 1516 to the start of the British Mandate for Palestine led to architectural changes in Gaza.

Medieval and post-medieval artefacts

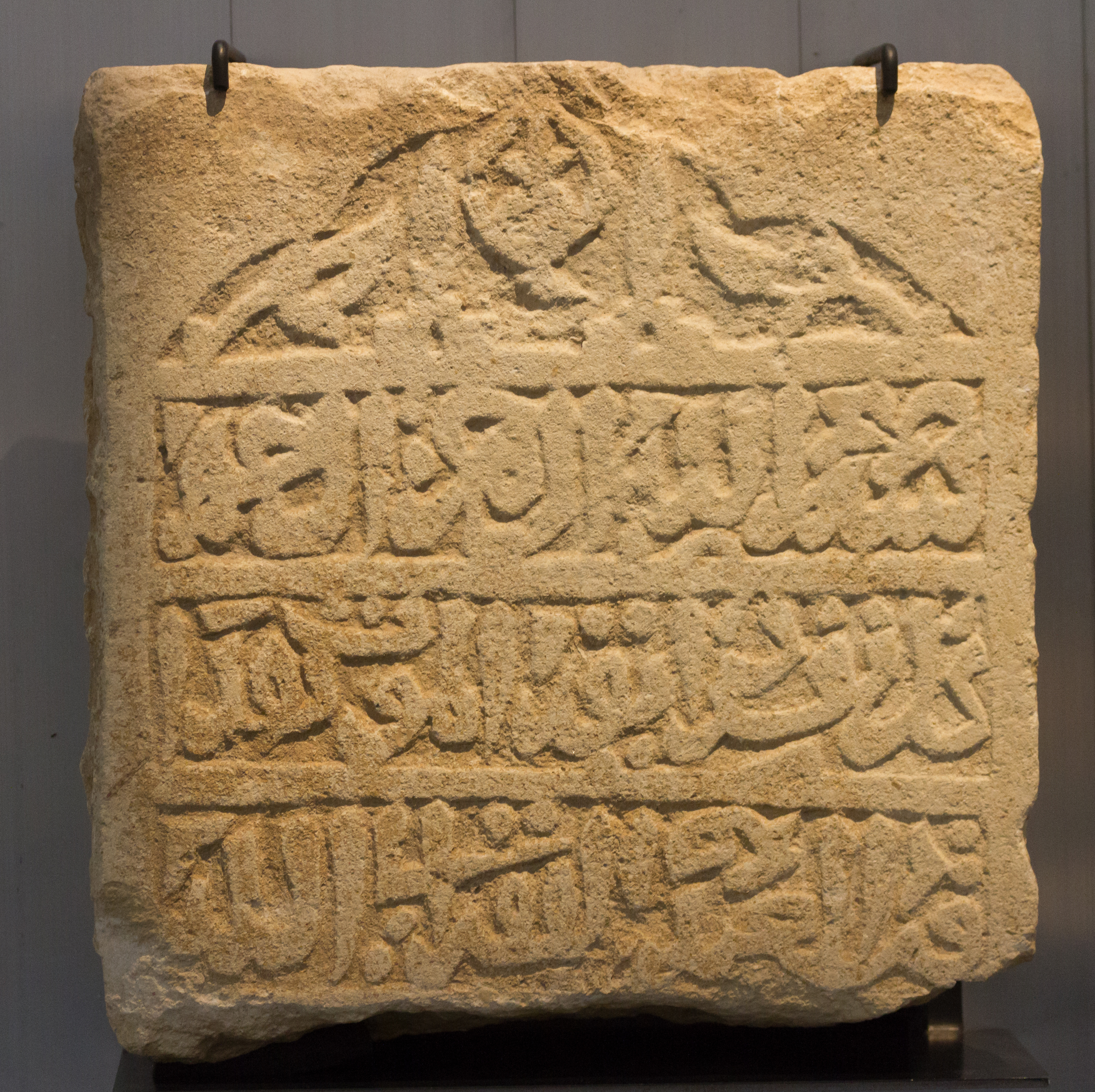
Funerary stele (8th–9th century)

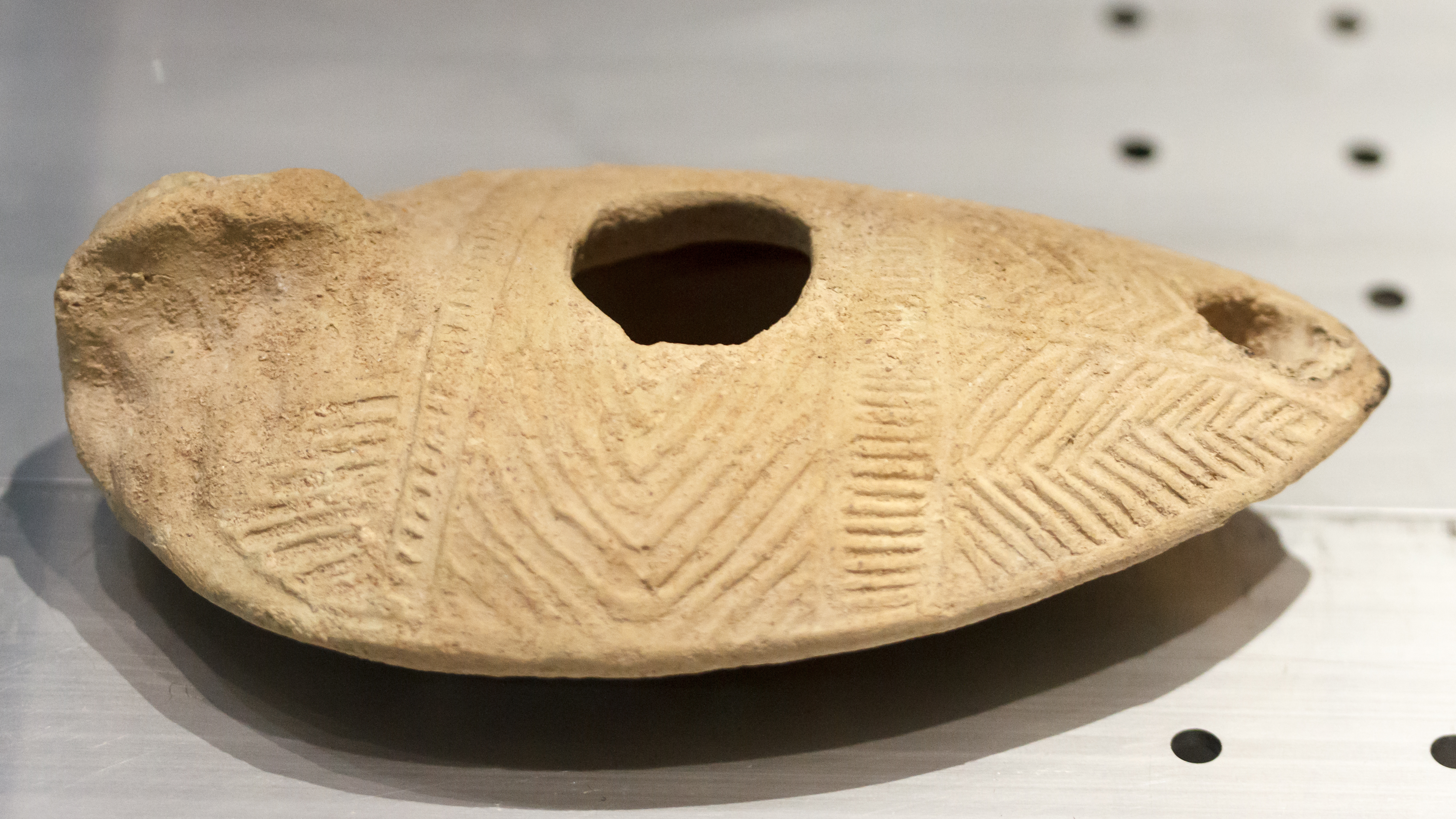
Slipper lamp from Tell Umm el-'Amr (13th–14th century)

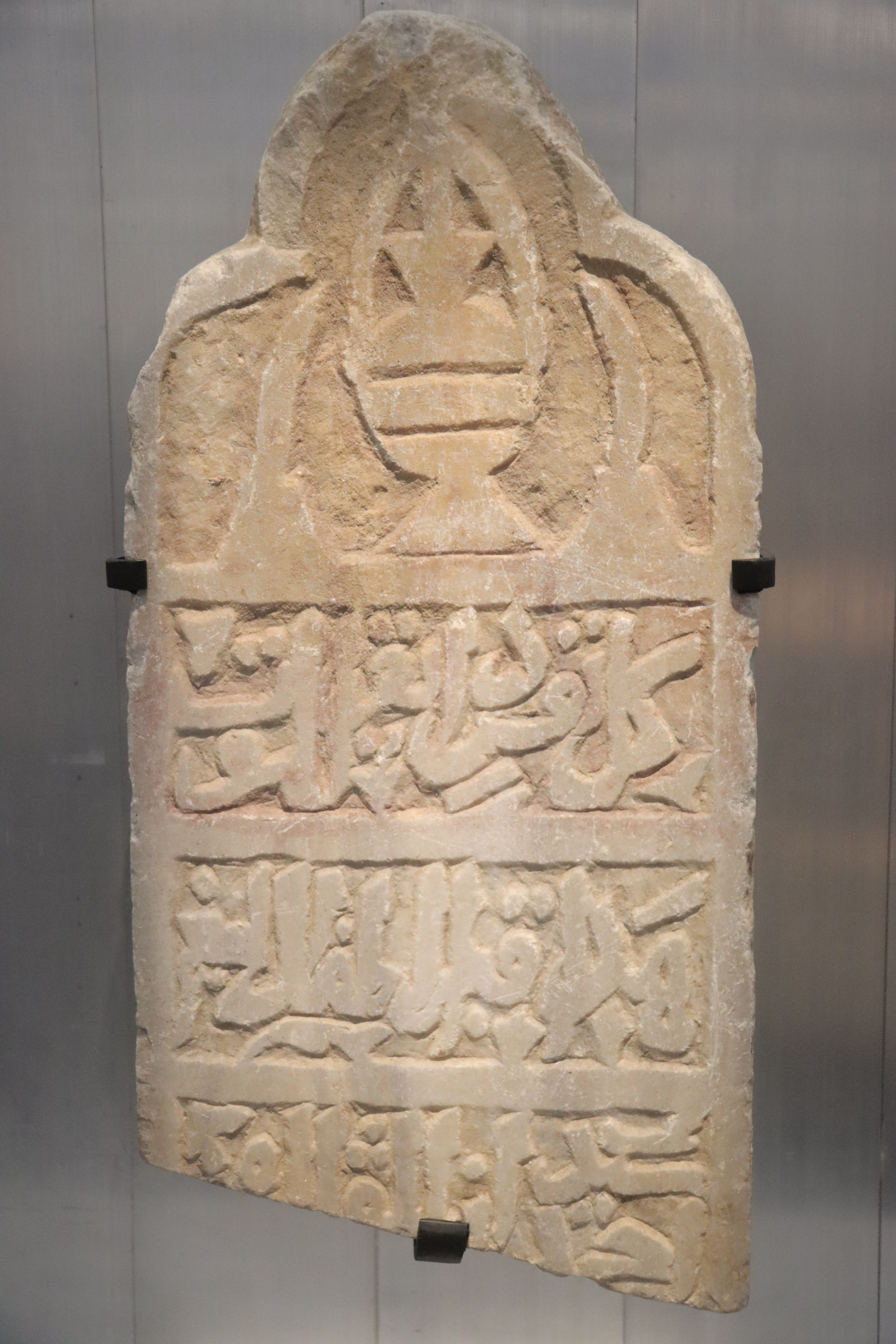
Funerary stele (13th–16th century)

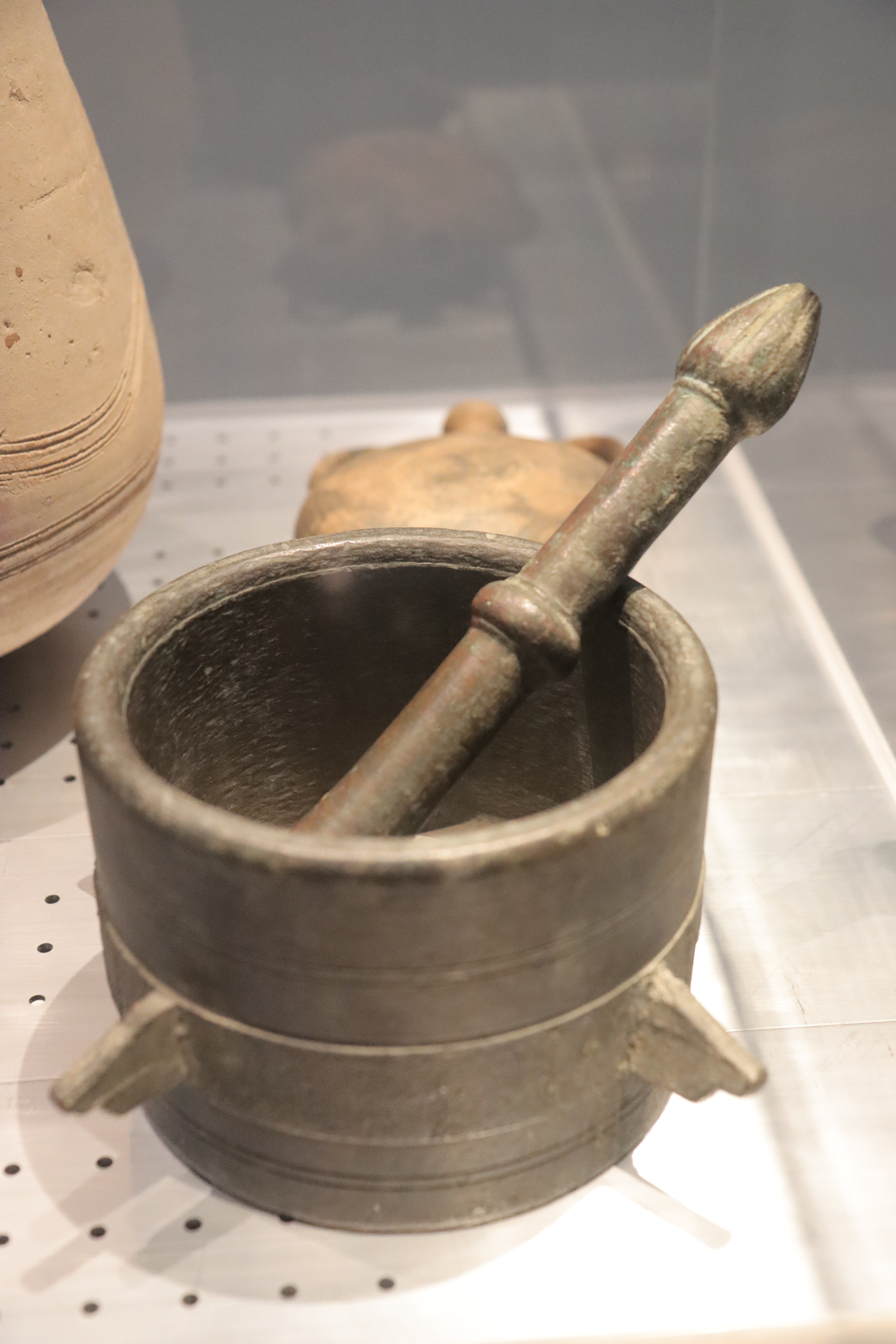
Mortar and pestle (16th–19th century)

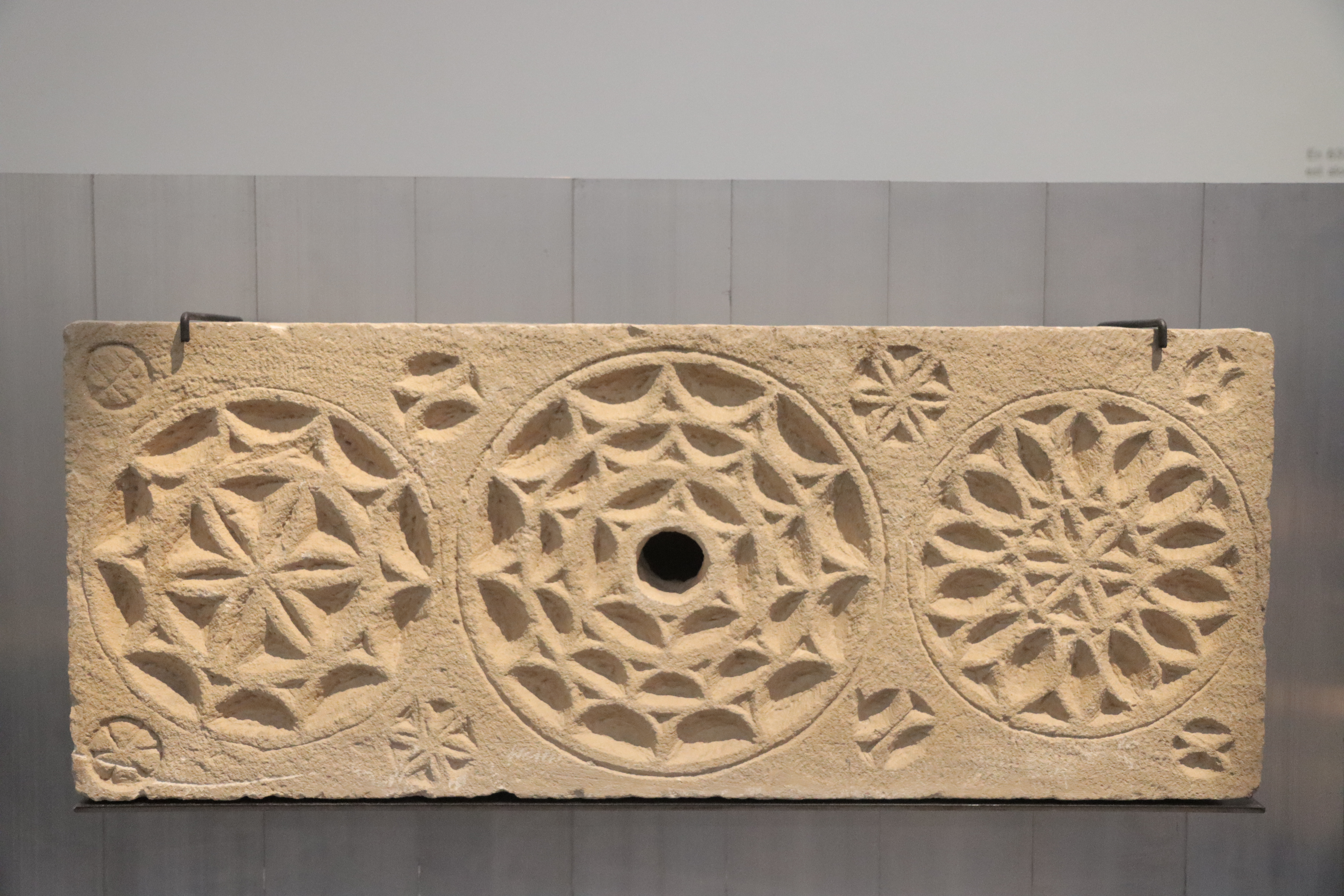
Lintel (19th-century)

The second room contained visual representations of heritage sites in Gaza. Historic photographs from the 1920s were displayed on the walls while in the centre of the room were modern photographs showing the impact of the Gaza war and the efforts of Palestinians to safeguard Gaza's heritage sites. The historic images were from the collection of the École biblique et archéologique française de Jérusalem. The early 20th-century and modern photographs of places around Gaza showed the character of its environment – with houses interspersed with religious buildings and gardens – and documented the damage sustained by the Great Mosque of Gaza in the First World War.

External videos
- Digital reconstructions
- St Hilarion Monastery in the 6th century
- The church in Jabalia in the 7th century

The second room also featured a map of heritage sites with details of the damage sustained during the Gaza war. The map was produced by a collaboration led by Fabrice Virgili involving 40 researchers and using information from United Nations Satellite Centre and Palestinian archaeologists on the ground in Gaza. The group also created a website with the research data, "Gaza: Inventory of Heritage Under Bombs" ("French: Gaza Histoire, inventaire d'un patrimoine bombardé").

Photographs by Raphaël Savignac in 1922

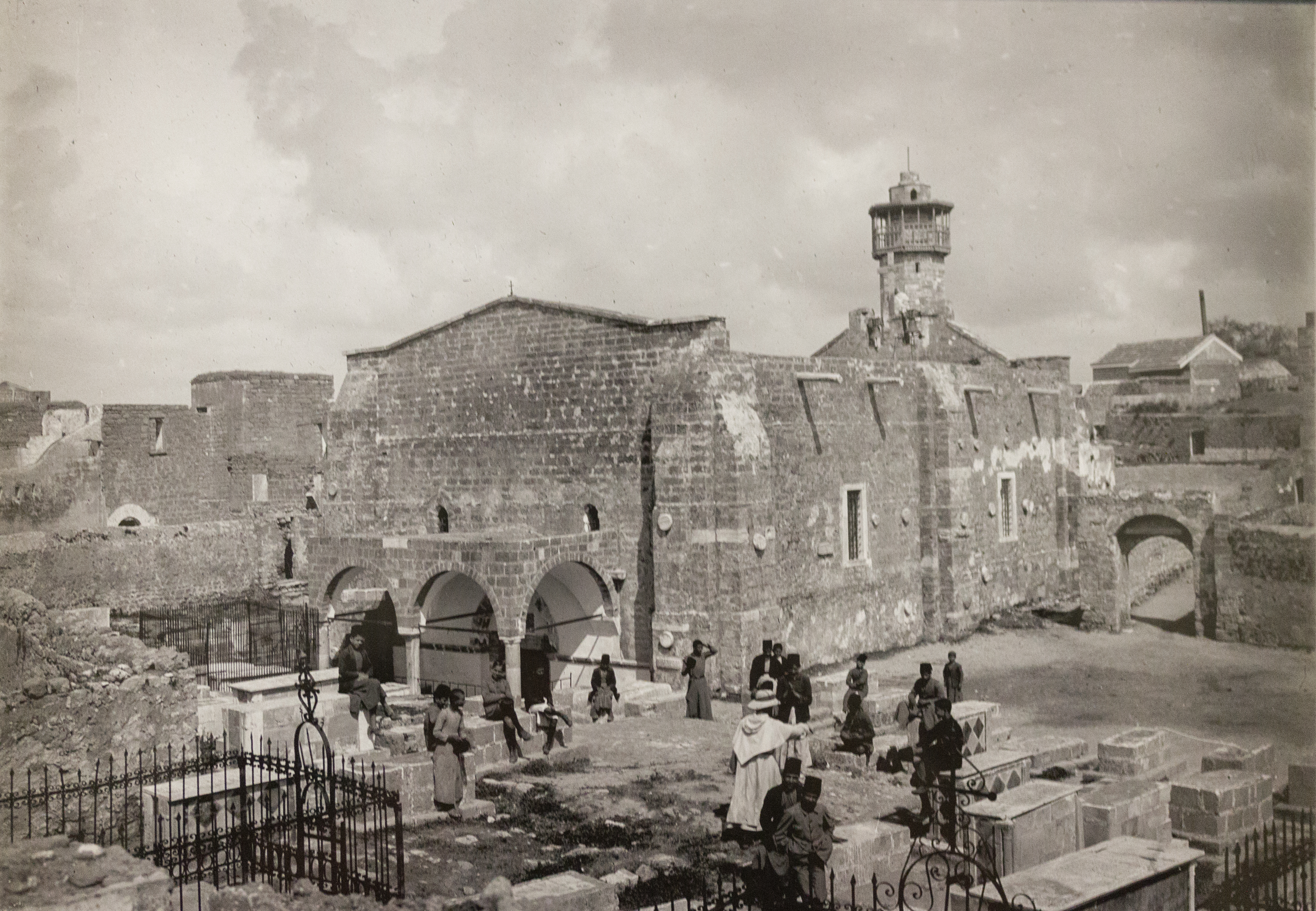
The Church of Saint Porphyrius

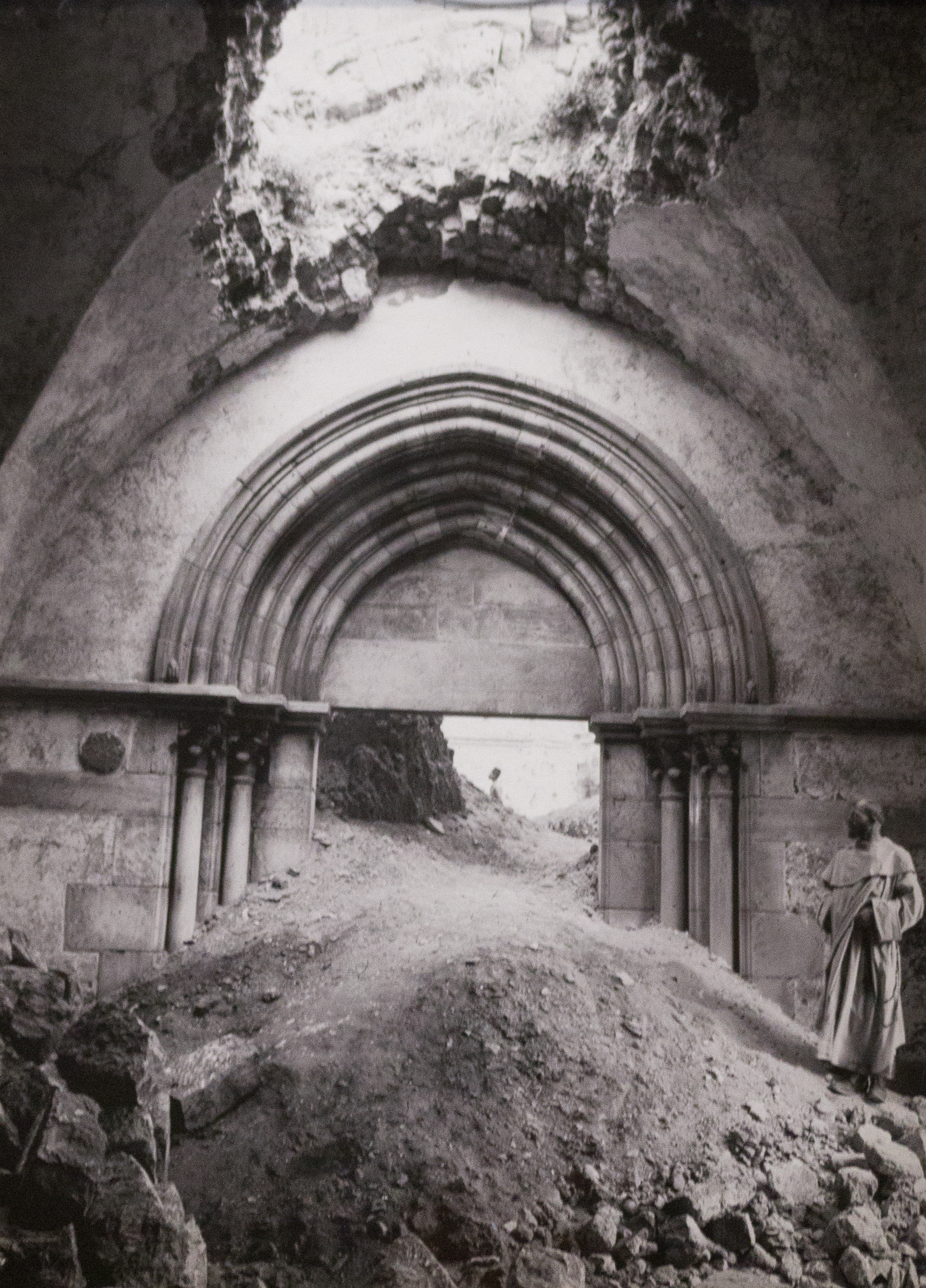
The damaged Great Mosque of Gaza

== Reception and legacy ==
French President Emmanuel Macron visited the exhibition in April 2025. During the visit, he reiterated his support of recognising Palestine as a sovereign state. The exhibition was planned to end on 5 November but was extended to 7 December 2025 due to public interest. Across the duration of its run the exhibition received nearly 115,000 visits. In a review of the exhibition, the archaeologist Hannah Cobbing noted that the exhibition's labels were only in French, with no Arabic description. She also commented:

Focussing on a region's material cultural heritage even as its people are also being decimated may feel uncomfortable, immoral even. Is the fate of a buried Byzantine building really as important as the lives of those who live close by? Of course not, and that priority of humanitarianism should always be remembered. But the cultural heritage of a place, whether that is the songs people sing or the buildings they sing them in is also a part of those people's identities, and that is why it matters.

The art critic Olympe Lemut compared the austere design to an airport terminal and felt that it reduced the emotional impact of the exhibition. She also said that some items such as the Byzantine mosaic at the centre of the first room was not well served by the neon lighting. Olympe also considered that the text of the exhibition did not always clearly relate to the objects on display, and that this was exacerbated by the lack of an exhibition catalogue at the time of her visit. The curator Elodie Bouffard and the archaeologist René Elter edited the catalogue resulting from the exhibition, published by Al Viso. Writing in The Spectator Australia, the historian William Dalrymple commented positively on the catalogue and the essays that contextualised the description of the exhibits. Around 500 artefacts from Gaza were stored in Geneva from previous exhibitions; some of these items were used in Saved Treasures of Gaza and renewed interest led to the stored artefacts being catalogued by the Palestinian archaeologist Fadel al-Utol. The postponed exhibition Byblos, Millennia-old City of Lebanon opened at the IMA in 2026.

== See also ==
- Deir el-Balah sarcophagi
