= Apollo of Gaza =

Ancient Greek sculpture

The Apollo of Gaza is a rare bronze sculpture of Magna Graecia of the Ancient Greek god Apollo found in the Gaza Strip in 2013. It was put for sale on eBay, and subsequently withdrawn and seized by police thanks to the publication of the story along with photographs by the Italian journalist Fabio Scuto on la Repubblica.

== Discovery ==
The statue was claimed to have been recovered from the sea in August 2013 by Joudat Ghrab, (Note: La Repubblica names the discoverer Mounir; the BBC calls him Jawdat Abu Ghurab.) a local Palestinian fisherman. Ghrab said that he saw the statue lying in shallow waters near the Gaza border with Egypt, and initially thought the statue was a badly burnt body. It took four hours to get the statue ashore. The statue was later put for sale on the internet auction site eBay for $500,000 by members of Ghrab's family. The sale price is believed to be significantly below its true value. Police appointed by Hamas, the government of the Gaza Strip, subsequently seized the statue and are investigating its provenance.

== Design ==
The statue has not been examined by archaeologists, but a Reuters report published in The Guardian attests to "a few blurred photographs of the intact deity, who is laid out incongruously on a blanket emblazoned with Smurfs". The evidence dates the statue to between the 5th century BC and the 1st century BC. The statue depicts Apollo with curly hair and one eye possibly inlaid with a blue stone iris, standing upright with an outstretched arm, and with his palm held up.

Historians have suggested that the statue was found on land rather than at sea owing to its apparent good preservation, without signs of metal disfigurement or barnacles. Noting the green patina, Gaza archaeologist Fadel al-Utol said: "If it had spent time underwater, the bronze would be blackened." The obscure location of the statue's discovery could be used to avoid ownership arguments. Ghrab said he believed the statue had been "...gifted to [him] by God...My financial situation is very difficult and I am waiting for my reward."
