= Byzantine Church of Jabalia =

Archaeological site in Palestine

- Mukheitim
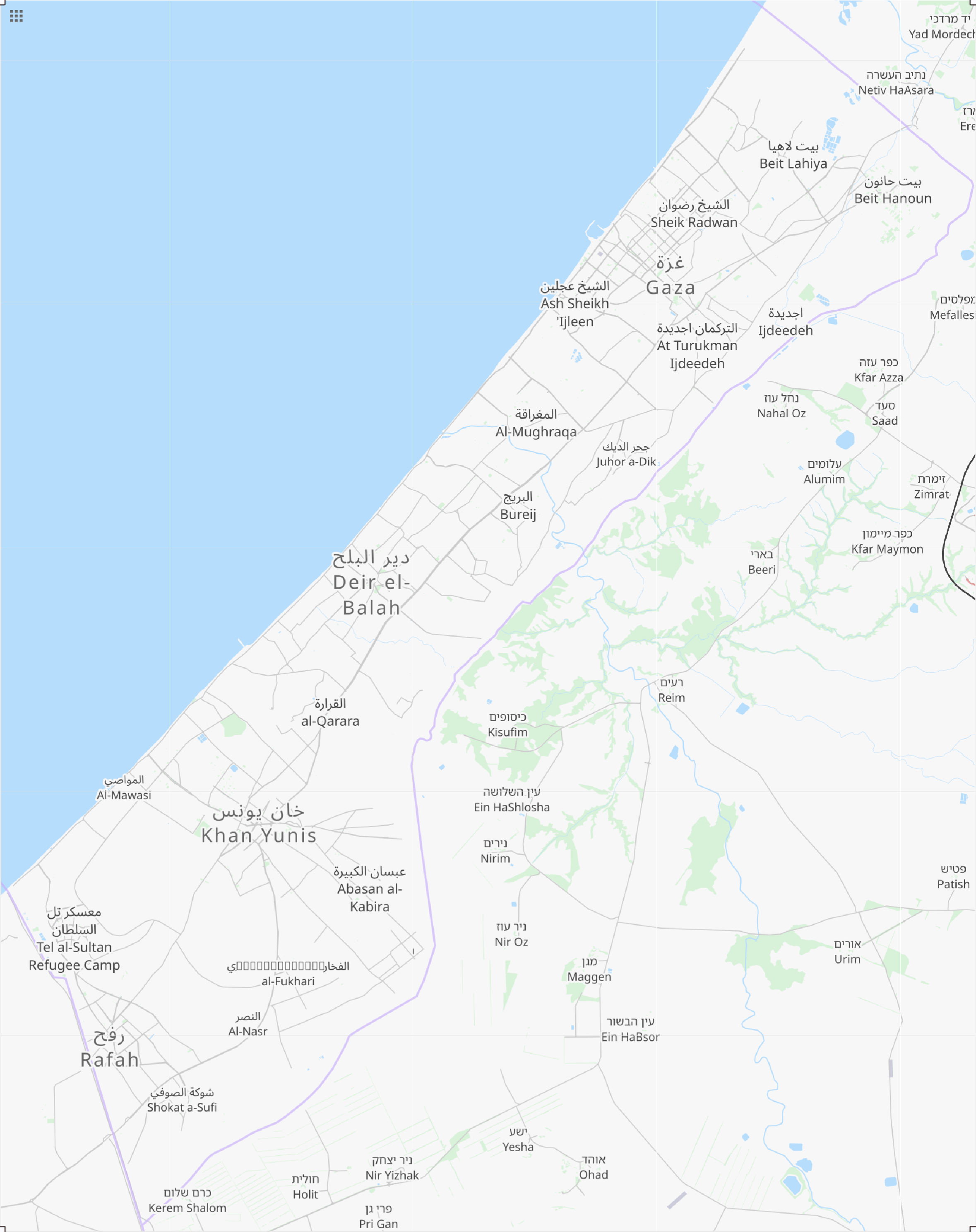
- Location within Gaza Strip Location within State of Palestine
- 31°31′30″N 34°29′56″E
- Type: Church
- Periods: Byzantine
- Location: Palestine

History
- Built: 5th century
- Abandoned: 8th century

Site notes
- Excavation dates: 1997
- Archaeologists: Yasser Matar; Ayman Hassuneh
- Discovered: 1996

The Byzantine Church of Jabalia in the Gaza Strip, which today is the remains of a Christian basilica church, includes graves and mosaic floors surrounded by marble columns on an area of 850 square metres (9,100 sq ft), including 400 square metres (4,300 sq ft) paved with mosaics. The church was established in the 5th century and was used until the 8th century.

== Location and early history ==
The church is located northeast of Gaza City, within the municipal boundaries of the city of Jabalia in the North Gaza Governorate, west of the Salah al-Din Road. The church includes a number of inscriptions recording the names of those who contributed to the church. The earliest dates to 444 AD, during the reign of the Byzantine Emperor Theodosius II (408–450). Another in the baptistry records the names of the artists who laid the mosaic floor in 548–49, Victor and Kosmas. When the church was discovered, there was no known contemporary settlement nearby.

Part of the mosaic pavement was laid at the start of the 8th century, dated by an original inscription. The mosaics were deliberately damaged by iconoclasts after 750, during the Abbasid period (see Byzantine Iconoclasm and Muslim iconoclasm). It is one of 87 known iconoclast churches spread across Israel, Jordan, Palestine and Syria. The church's decoration contains a large number of geometric and floral decorations, figure paintings, rural scenes, cooking utensils, domestic animals and predatory animals from Palestine and abroad, and various types of tuna. It also includes hunting scenes, rivers, and palm trees.

== Discovery and preservation ==
In the 1990s, the World Bank and the governments of Denmark, Kuwait, Saudi Arabia, and Switzerland funded rehabilitation projects in Palestine. The remains of the church were discovered in December 1996 during one such project: reconstruction works on the Salah al-Din Road. Archaeological investigations followed as part of an international collaboration involving the École Biblique; the project was funded by the French Direction Générale des Relations Culturelles, Scientifiques et Techniques. Yasser Matar and Ayman Hassuneh led the excavations for the Department of Antiquities in Gaza.

The church has been damaged at various points during the Gaza–Israel conflict: in 2003, 2014, and 2021. During an incursion by the Israeli military in late 2004 a tracked vehicle crushed several columns and damaged the south-eastern portion of the nave; repairs were made the following year. In 2010, the Ministry of Tourism and Antiquities installed a canopy to protect the mosaic floor from erosion. A restoration project involving international partner organisations began in 2019; it was completed in January 2022 when the church reopened to the public. The Intiqal project was established in 2017 to record the Byzantine Church of Jabalia and Tell Umm el-'Amr. It provided training for more than 100 Palestinians to learn about archaeological practice. After starting with a focus on the two Byzantine sites, it expanded at the request of the Ministry of Tourism and Antiquities.

External videos
- YouTube video
- Reconstruction of how the church may have appeared in the 7th century, produced as part of a Première Urgence Internationale project

In November 2023, a report by Heritage for Peace on the impact on cultural heritage sites of the Israeli invasion of the Gaza Strip included the church as a site that was completely destroyed by shelling. In January 2025, archaeologist Fadel Al Utol reported that while there was debris at the archaeological site that the mosaics were still intact. Later that year, a digital reconstruction of how the church may have appeared was included in the exhibition Saved Treasures of Gaza: 5000 Years of History at the Institut du monde arabe in Paris. The church was added to the tentative list of World Heritage Sites in Palestine in 2026.

== Layout ==
The layout of the complex was inferred from the layout of the mosaic floors as the stone walls had long since been robbed out by the time the complex was rediscovered in the 20th century. The church was part of a complex of buildings, of which the basilica church was the main element. Attached to it was a diakonikon, and beyond that a baptistry. The church measured 23 by 13 metres (75 by 43 ft) and consisted of a central nave flanked by aisles. The floor was covered by mosaics, the design of which included animal in scenes set in the countryside.

== See also ==
- Blakhiya Byzantine cemetery
- Destruction of cultural heritage during the Gaza war
- List of archaeological sites in the Gaza Strip
