= Ayman Hassouna =

Palestinian archaeologist

- Citizenship: Palestinian
- Occupations: Archaeologist; University lecturer

Academic work
- Discipline: Archaeology
- Sub-discipline: Archaeology of Gaza
- Institutions: Department of Antiquities; Islamic University of Gaza

Ayman Hassouna is a Palestinian archaeologist and university teacher. He has worked for the Department of Antiquities of Gaza and lectured at the Islamic University of Gaza (IUG). Hassouna has led excavations at the Byzantine Church of Jabalia and been involved in conservation projects.

== Biography ==
In 1995, Hassouna joined the team of archaeologists excavating Anthedon and was involved in the project for nearly a decade. While working for the Department of Antiquities of Gaza in the 1990s, Hassouna led the excavations of the Byzantine Church of Jabalia along with Yasser Matar. From 2002 he jointly led excavations at Saint Hilarion Monastery with René Elter. Hassouna has also been involved in conservation and restoration projects at historic sites in Gaza, consulting on the conservation of a Byzantine mosaic floor in Abasan al-Kabira, and working with the project at Saint Hilarion Monastery. Hassouna has criticised Hamas, the Palestinian Authority, and Israel for conservation challenges facing Palestinian heritage sites.

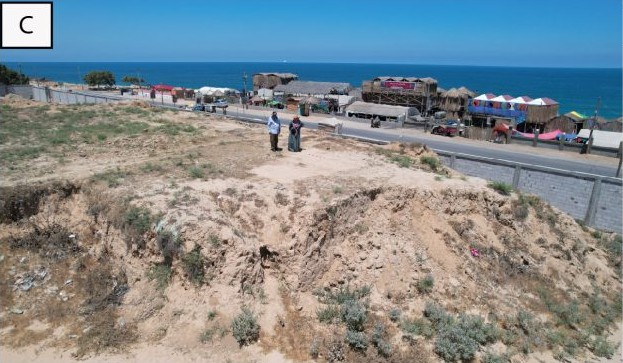
The GAZAMAP team surveying the summit of Tell Ruqeish in 2022. Hassouna led the fieldwork to train students from IUG.

Hassouna has worked at the Islamic University of Gaza (IUG) as professor of history and archaeology. He collaborated with the Gaza Maritime Archaeology Project (GAZAMAP) project on behalf of IUG from 2022 to 2023 and as field director he led student training expeditions to Tell es-Sakan and Tell Ruqeish. The project aimed to document these sites and create expertise in maritime archaeology within Gaza.

Hassouna continued teaching through the COVID-19 pandemic, using Zoom to deliver lectures, and used the same methods to teach during the Israeli invasion of the Gaza Strip. The main buildings of IUG were destroyed early in the Gaza war. Following the start of the invasion in October 2023, Hassouna and his family evacuated from Gaza City. They lived in cramped temporary accommodation and had to relocate again as the fighting spread. His home was destroyed during the invasion and, in 2024, Hassouna evacuated to Egypt and proceeded to the UAE.
