= Tell Ruqeish =

Archaeological site in Palestine

- تل الرقيش (Arabic)
- Tell er-Ruqeish; Tell ‘Akluk; Tell Ruqaish
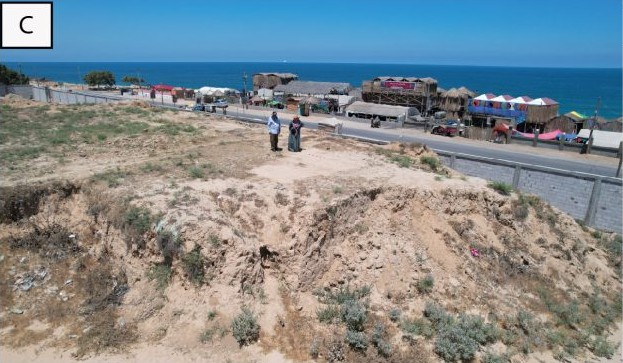
- The summit of the Tell in 2022

- Shown within Palestine
- 31°24′55″N 34°19′41″E
- Periods: Iron Age, Persian
- Associated with: Philistines and Phoenicians
- Location: Deir el-Balah, Gaza Strip, Palestine
- Region: Levant

Site notes
- Area: 8 to 10 hectares (20 to 25 acres)
- Excavation dates: 1940, 1973, 1982–84, 1993
- Archaeologists: Jacob Ory; Avraham Biran; Eliezer Oren; Ya'aqov Huster; Ayman Hassouna
- Management: Ministry of Tourism and Antiquities

Tell Ruqeish (Arabic: تل الرقيش) is an Iron Age settlement and archaeological site situated on the Mediterranean coast between Rafah and Gaza in the Gaza Strip. It was established in the 8th century BC and continued as a trading port by the Neo-Assyrian and Achaemenid empires until the 4th century BC. The tell (an archaeological mound) began as a fortified settlement, but the fortifications were abandoned while habitation continued. The remains include a cemetery, fortification walls, possible warehouses, and structures connected to industrial processes. The site was partially excavated at several points in the 20th century. Part of the settlement has been submerged by rising sea levels.

== History ==
The Neo-Assyrian Empire conquered Philistine Gaza in 734 BC, during the Iron Age, and Gaza became a vassal city state. Along with Iblakhiyya, Tell Ruqeish is one of two sites in the Gaza Strip to have produced significant remains dating to the Neo-Assyrian period.

The Phoenician settlement of Tell Ruqeish was established in the second half of the 8th century BC. It was an important trading hub during the rule of the Neo-Assyrian and Achaemenid Empires in the region. The archaeologists who investigated the site in the 1980s suggested that its distance from Gaza was evidence that it was administratively independent. The cremation burials found at Tell Ruqeish were consistent with Phoenicians funerary customs. Archaeologist Eliezer Oren suggested that Tell Ruqish may be the site referred to as "sealed Karum of Egypt" in a late 8th-century BC inscription from Nimrud. The fortification wall that formed the boundary of the Iron Age settlement was disused in the Persian period, and Tell Ruqeish was essentially an unfortified settlement at that stage.

In 1940, 30 graves were found at Tell Ruqeish during work on building a police station. Jacob Ory carried out excavations of the cemetery for the British Mandate Department of Antiquities in Palestine. The associated settlement was found later. Avraham Biran of the Israel Department of Antiquities led excavations at Tell Ruqeish in late 1973, ahead of the development of a road in the area. The work investigated two areas about 500 metres (1,600 ft) apart. In the northern area found walls and floors that likely formed part of the settlement connected to the cemetery; the remains were dated to the Iron Age and Persian periods. The southern area investigated focused on the cemetery identified by Ory.

Eliezer Oren of the Ben-Gurion University of the Negev led excavations at Tell Ruqeish between 1982 and 1984. Further excavations were carried out in 1993 by Ya'aqov Huster of the Israel Antiquities Authority with the involvement of Palestinian archaeologists to record archaeological remains that had been damaged during the process of mining kurkar (lithified sand dunes). The work investigated part of the northern wall enclosing the settlement, and found further evidence that the fortification went out of use in the Iron Age.

Building works, coastal erosion, and erosion of the sand dunes covering the site all present conservation challenges. In 2022, the Gaza Maritime Archaeology Project (GAZAMAP) involving researchers based in Gaza and the UK conducted a field survey of Tell Ruqeish, recording new features at the site. The fieldwork was led by Ayman Hassouna of the Islamic University of Gaza along with a group of ten students and some divers who examined the submerged remains. Tell Ruqeish was affected during the Israeli invasion of the Gaza Strip, though to what extent is uncertain. A 2025 report by the Centre for Cultural Heritage Preservation noted that the main cause of damage to the site was the presence of internally displaced people.

== Layout ==
External videos
- YouTube video
- A video showing the state of Tell Ruqeish in 2021 by Arab Reporters for Investigative Journalism

The site covers approximately 8 to 10 hectares (20 to 25 acres), and the fortified settlement is delineated by a 5.5-metre (18 ft) thick wall which survives to a height of 5 metres (16 ft) in parts. Tell Ruqeish's coastal location means that it is vulnerable to erosion, and some of the features identified in the 1970s have since been submerged as the coastline retreats. It is located between Rafah and Gaza on the coast of Deir el-Balah in the Gaza Strip, 18 kilometres (11 mi) south of Gaza City.

Occupation layers at Tell Ruqeish are up to 4 metres (13 ft) thick, containing evidence of Iron Age and Persian activity at the site. Buildings identified through excavation include possible warehouses and the remains of a structure used in industrial processes. The north end of the site was elevated and had its own mound, Tel Katif, that has been interpreted as a citadel.

In the Iron Age the settlement extended further to the west, but the sea level has since risen by an estimated 2 metres (6 ft 7 in). The archaeologists involved with the 1980s investigations remarked that Tell Ruqeish's "extensive area ... and the massive system of fortifications that surrounded it put it on a par with the large urban settlements in Palestine during the Iron Age".

== See also ==
- List of archaeological sites in the Gaza Strip

== Bibliography ==
- Andreou, Georgia; ElKhoudary, Yasmeen (12 May 2022), GAZAMAP – Maritime archaeological survey and assessment at Tell Ruqeish and Tell es-Sakan (Gaza Strip) – 2022, Honor Frost Foundation
- Andreou, Georgia M.; Elkhoudary, Yasmeen; Hassouna, Ayman (2024). "New investigations in Gaza's heritage landscapes: the Gaza Maritime Archaeology Project (GAZAMAP)" (PDF). Antiquity. 98 (400): 1–9. doi:10.15184/aqy.2024.68. ISSN 0003-598X.
- Andreou, Georgia M.; Fradley, Michael; Blue, Lucy; Breen, Colin (2024). "Establishing a baseline for the study of maritime cultural heritage in the Gaza Strip" (PDF). Palestine Exploration Quarterly. 156 (1): 4–42. doi:10.1080/00310328.2022.2037923. ISSN 0031-0328.
- Biran, Avraham (1974). "Tell er-Ruqeish to Tell er-Ridan". Israel Exploration Journal. 24 (2): 141–142.
- Centre for Cultural Heritage Preservation (January 2025). Damage and Risk Assessment of Cultural Heritage Under Attack in the Gaza Strip (PDF) (Report). State of Palestine Ministry of Tourism and Antiquities. Archived from the original (PDF) on 2025-07-29.
- Culican, William (1973). "The graves at Tell er-Reqeish" (PDF). Australian Journal of Biblical Archaeology. 1 (6): 66–105.
- Geranpayeh, Sarvy (28 November 2023). "Bombing of Gaza has damaged or destroyed more than 100 heritage sites, NGO report reveals". The Art Newspaper – International art news and events. Archived from the original on 28 January 2024.
- Huster, Ya'aqov (2000). "Tell er-Ruqeish". Hadashot Arkheologiyot: Excavations and Surveys in Israel. 111: 87–88. JSTOR 23472650.
- Negev, Avraham; Gibson, Shimon, eds. (2001) [1972]. The New Encyclopedia of Archaeological Excavations in the Holy Land (revised ed.). New York and London: Continuum. ISBN 0-8264-1316-1.
- Oren, Eliezer; Fleming, N.; Kornberg, S.; Feinstein, R.; Naḥshoni, P. (1986). "A Phoenician Emporium on the Border of Egypt" [מרכז-מסחר פיניקי בגבול מצרים]. Qadmoniot: A Journal for the Antiquities of Eretz-Israel and Bible Lands (in Hebrew): 83–91. JSTOR 23676436.
- Sadeq, Moain (2014). "An Overview of Iron Age Gaza in Light of the Archaeological Evidence". Material Culture Matters. De Gruyter. pp. 239–254. doi:10.1515/9781575068787-019. ISBN 978-1-57506-878-7.
