= Fadel al-Utol =

Palestinian archaeologist

- Born: 1981 (age 44–45); Al-Shati refugee camp
- Citizenship: Palestinian
- Occupation: Archaeologist
- Years active: 1995–present
- Organizations: Intiqal 2030; Musée d'Art et d'Histoire (Geneva)

Fadel al-Utol (born 1981) is a Palestinian archaeologist specialising in the archaeology of Gaza. He has been involved in various excavations in the Gaza Strip since becoming interested in archaeology as a teenager. He has campaigned for the preservation of Gaza's historic sites and during the Israeli invasion of the Gaza Strip he documented the damage it caused to them.

== Biography ==
Fadel al-Utol was born in 1981 in the Al-Shati refugee camp. Al-Utol first became involved with archaeology as a teenager in the 1990s, when he asked archaeologists working at Anthedon if he could take part. He was supported by Jean-Baptiste Humbert, who led the investigations at Anthedon, and helped al-Utol take part in training outside Gaza. Later in the 1990s, al-Utol was part of the team that conducted excavations at Saint Hilarion Monastery near Deir al-Balah, working on the Byzantine church. For al-Utol, archaeology is a form of resistance: "I remember that when I was little I resisted the occupation by throwing stones, but today I resist the Israeli occupation, peacefully, by preserving the remains of ancient civilisations, which are much older than the creation of Israel".

In 2017, Hamas began bulldozing Tell es-Sakan, a Bronze Age settlement near al-Zahra. Al-Utol led protestors campaigning to stop building work. The same year al-Utol joined the Intiqal 2030 project, a Première Urgence Internationale initiative to preserve Gaza's archaeological sites and train young people.

Al-Utol was part of the team excavating the Ard-al-Moharbeen necropolis – a Roman site in the north of the Gaza Strip – which was discovered in 2022. When the Israeli invasion of the Gaza Strip began in October 2023, al-Utol closed the archaeological site and evacuated his family south to Rafah where they lived in tents. During the conflict, al-Utol documented the impact on Gaza's archaeological and cultural sites. As well as his own first-hand accounts, he gathered accounts from a group of volunteers. Following the ceasefire in January 2025, thousands of Palestinians who had been displaced by the war began to return home; al-Utol and his family made the journey home to Gaza City on foot. Along the way, he documented the damage to the Byzantine Church of Jabalia – a site he had previously worked at. Since April 2025, al-Utol has worked at the Musée d'Art et d'Histoire in Geneva researching a collection of 500 artefacts from Gaza transferred there in the early 21st century.
