= Jean-Baptiste Humbert =

French archaeologist (born 1940)

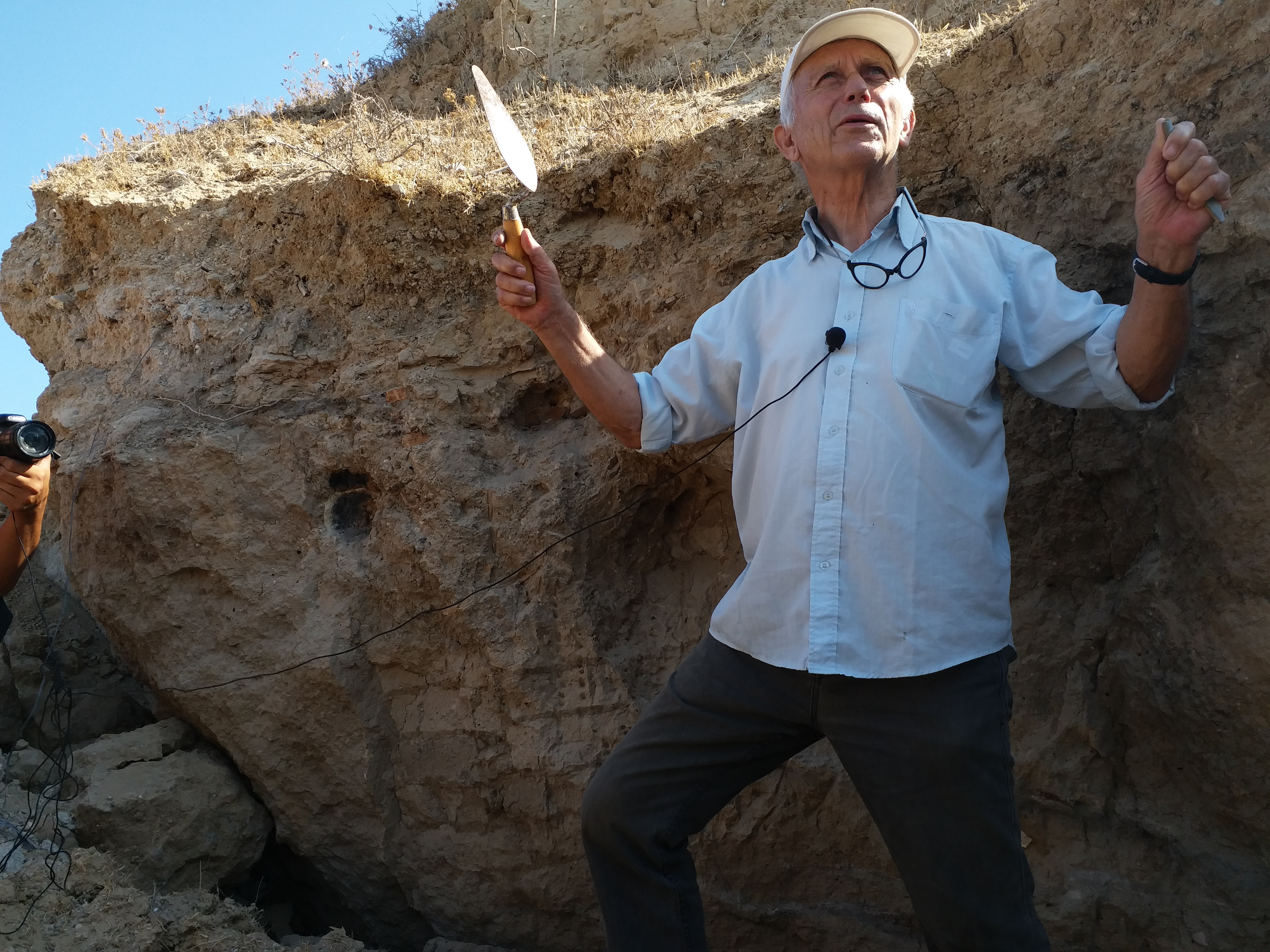
- Humbert at Tell es-Sakan in 2017
- Born: 8 December 1940 (age 85)
- Citizenship: France
- Occupation: Archaeologist

Academic work
- Discipline: Archaeology
- Sub-discipline: Near Eastern archaeology
- Institutions: École Biblique

Jean-Baptiste Humbert (born 8 December 1940) is a French archaeologist who has excavated in Jordan, Palestine, Iran and Israel. He is of the order of the Dominicans and is director of the Archaeology Laboratory of the École Biblique in Jerusalem. He was responsible for publishing the notes and materials from the excavations of Qumran, which were under the direction of Roland de Vaux.

== Career ==
Humbert was born in Mâcon (Saône-et-Loire) on 8 December 1940. After school he studied at an art design school before fulfilling military obligations. In 1965 he became a novitiate of the Dominican order. He took seminars in archaeology while studying theology. In 1973 he received a degree in theology, after which he moved to the École biblique in Jerusalem where he began to study archaeology at a higher level, completing various courses of study, which included fieldwork throughout the 1970s. He was professor of Palestinian Archaeology until 2004.

From 1988 to 1994 Humbert co-directed digs at the citadel of Amman in Jordan. Until 1993 he directed the excavations at Khirbet es-Samra, also in Jordan. Since 1995 he has led a mission to Gaza, uncovering the Byzantine remains there. Humbert became an influential figure in the region and trained many Palestinian archaeologists such as Fadel al-Utol.

In 1986 the Ecole Biblique decided to publish the final report of the Qumran excavations carried out by Roland de Vaux and appointed Humbert to expedite the publication. In 1993 he published the notes and photographs of de Vaux in collaboration with Alain Chambon. Two new books, devoted to the interpretation of the excavations of Fr. Roland de Vaux, were published in 2003 and 2016.

== Selected publications ==
Among his Qumran works are:

- J.-B. Humbert, Alain Chambon, Jolanta Mlynarczyk, "Khirbet Qumrân et Aïn Feshkha, Fouilles du P. Roland de Vaux", vol. IIIa, L'archéologie de Qumrân, Reconsidération de l'interprétation; Corpus of the Lamps, Novum Testamentum et Orbis Antiquus, Series Archaeologica 5a, Vandenhoeck & Ruprecht, Göttingen, 2016, 536 p. (ISBN 978-3-525-54054-1)
- "L’espace sacré à Qumrân, propositions pour l’archéologie", Revue biblique 101, 1994, pp. 160–214, pl. I–III.
- J.-B. Humbert & J. Gunneweg (Eds.) Khirbet Qumrân et ’Aïn Feshkha, II, Études d’anthropologie, de physique et de chimie. Studies of Anthropology, Physics and Chemistry, (Novum testamentum et Orbis Antiquus, Series Archæologica, 3), Academic Press, Fribourg (Suisse)/ Vandenhoeck & Ruprecht, Göttingen, 2003.
- "Reconsideration of the Archaeological Interpretation", 419–424, in Humbert & Gunneweg.
- "The Chronology during the First Century B.C., de Vaux and his Method: a Debate", 425–444, in Humbert & Gunneweg.
- K. Galor, J.-B. Humbert & J. Zangenberg (Eds.) Qumran The Site of the Dead Sea Scrolls: Archaeological Interpretations and Debates, Proceedings of a Conference held at Brown University, Nov. 17–19, 2002, (Studies on the Texts of the Desert of Judah, 57), Koninklijke Brill, Leiden / Boston 2006.
- "Some Remarks on the Archaeology of Qumran," 19–39, in Galor, Humbert & Zangenberg.
- Collab. with Estelle Villeneuve, L'affaire Qumrân : Les découvertes de la mer Morte, coll. "Découvertes Gallimard" (n° 498), Gallimard, 2006, ISBN 9782070321155.

== See also ==
- Greek Orthodox Church of Saint John the Baptist, Jerusalem
