= Saint Hilarion Monastery =

Ruins of ancient monastery in Gaza Strip, Palestine

UNESCO World Heritage Site
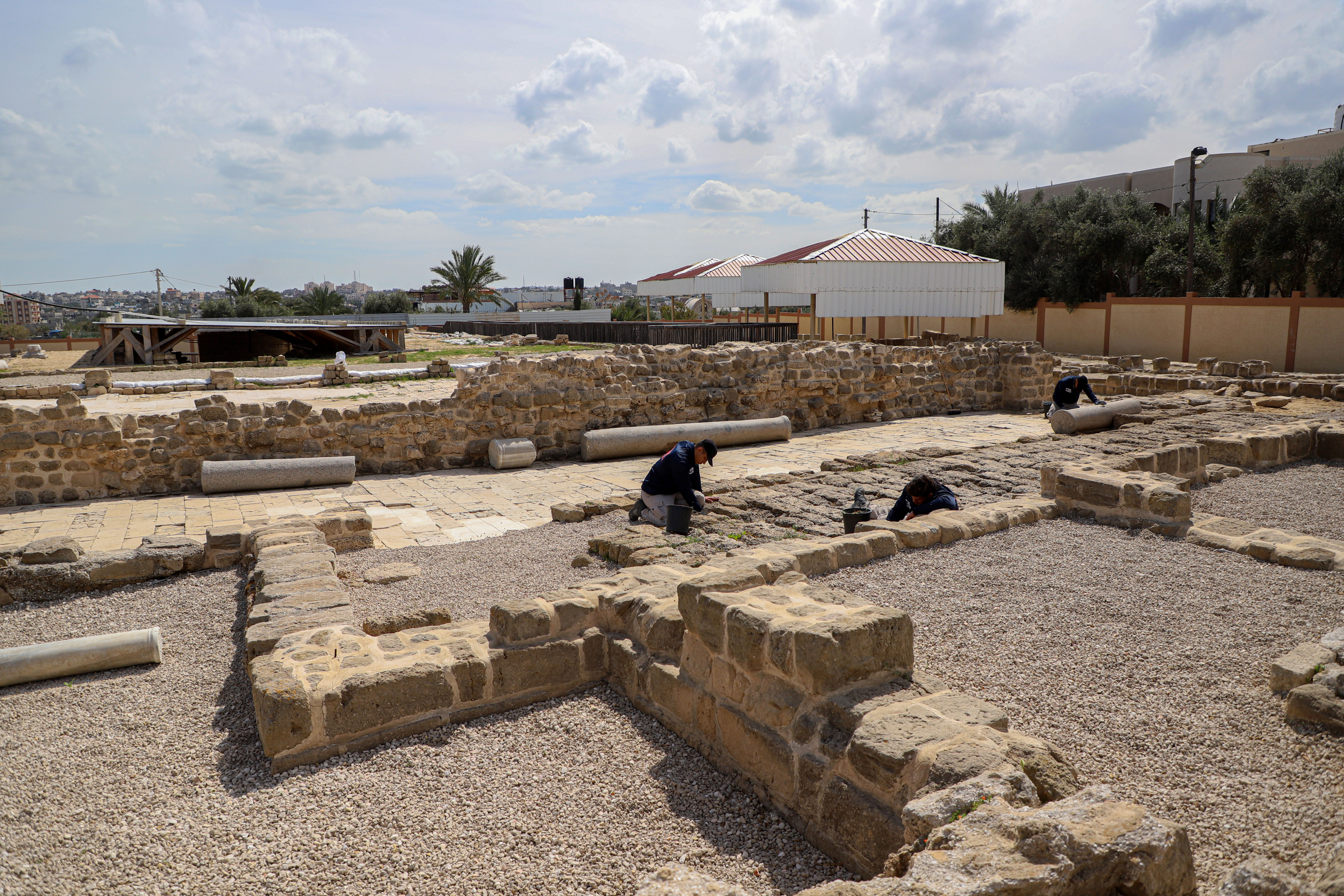
- Ruins of Saint Hilarion Monastery, 2023
- Interactive map of Saint Hilarion Monastery
- Official name: Saint Hilarion Monastery at Tell Umm Amer
- Location: State of Palestine
- Part of: Tell Umm el-'Amr
- Criteria: Cultural: (ii), (iii), (vi)
- Reference: 1749
- Endangered: 2024–present
- Area: 1.3293 ha (3.285 acres)
- Buffer zone: 7.3226 ha (18.095 acres)
- Coordinates: 31°26′50″N 34°21′59″E

Saint Hilarion Monastery was an ancient Christian monastery in Palestine. The ruins are part of the archaeological site of Tell Umm el-'Amr, and designated a UNESCO World Heritage Site. It is close to Deir al-Balah in the Gaza Strip.

== History and archaeology ==
The monastery was founded c. 340 by Hilarion, a native of the Gaza region and one possible father of Palestinian monasticism (see also Chariton the Confessor). Hilarion had converted to Christianity in Alexandria and then, inspired by St Anthony, become a hermit first in Egypt and then in his home region. He then founded a hermitage close to his home village of Thabatha and by the time Hilarion was sixty-three, the monastery was large and attracted many visitors. Though seemingly back then located in the desert, it was in reality at the crossroads between Egypt, Palestine, Syria and Mesopotamia and is believed to be a center of missionary work in the Gaza region.

External videos
- YouTube video
- Reconstruction of how the monastery may have appeared in the 6th century, produced as part of an international research project

The remains of Saint Hilarion Monastery span more than four centuries, from the Late Roman to the Umayyad period, and are characterized by five successive churches, bath and sanctuary complexes, geometric mosaics, and an expansive crypt. As the hermitage was likely consisting of small hermits' cells according to the tradition of St. Anthony build out of mud bricks and perishable material, resulting in that their remains have not been preserved. The site was abandoned after a seventh-century earthquake and rediscovered by local archaeologists in 1999. The 14th-century pilgrim Antony of Cremona mentioned in his travel report that there was a church called St. Hilarion in Tabatha, but it is uncertain whether he was referring to a building that still existed or if he was retelling information derived from an earlier source. According to local tradition and observations from Western travelers in the 19th century, the prayer hall of the Monastery of Hilarion is currently occupied by the Mosque of al-Khidr. French explorer Victor Guérin noted that two marble columns in the mosque were possibly parts of the Byzantine-era monastery.

== Discovery and investigation ==
The remains of the monastery were discovered during building works in 1997. The location, known as Umm-el-'Amr, was part of the Nuseirat municipality and lay beyond the modern urbanised area. The Palestinian Ministry of Tourism and Antiquities instigated an international collaboration with the École biblique et archéologique française de Jérusalem and the National Institute for Preventive Archaeological Research (Inrap). Archaeological excavations began in 1997 initially under the direction of Yasser Matar of the Department of Antiquities of Gaza. From 2002, the excavations were jointly directed by René Elter and Ayman Hassouna.

== Current state ==
In 2015, it was the only archaeological site accessible to the public in Gaza, making it an especially treasured and important cultural heritage. Before the Gaza War it received around 14,000 visitors a year.

According to the Ministry of Tourism in Gaza, the Saint Hilarion Monastery in 2016 was in dire need of preservation. Current preservation efforts are plagued by war and conflict in the region, as well as a shortage of materials and equipment needed for excavation. The site was included on the 2012 World Monuments Watch and classified as "Rescue Needed" by Global Heritage Network.

=== Damage during the Gaza War ===
In December 2023, UNESCO granted the monastery "provisional enhanced protection". In January 2024, Al Jazeera reported that the monastery is one of 195 cultural heritage sites that have been damaged or destroyed since Gaza war began. In July 2024, the monastery was included on the List of World Heritage in Danger by UNESCO. The listing was fast-tracked using emergency procedures, with UNESCO expressing "deep concern about the impact of the ongoing conflict on cultural heritage, particularly in the Gaza Strip" and stating "The organization urges all involved parties to strictly adhere to international law, emphasizing that cultural property should not be targeted or used for military purposes, as it is considered civilian infrastructure."

A digital reconstruction of how the monastery may have looked was included in the 2025 exhibition Saved Treasures of Gaza: 5000 Years of History at the Institut du monde arabe in Paris.

== See also ==
- List of archaeological sites in the Gaza Strip

== Bibliography ==
- Almbaid, Rania Filfil (2015). "Gaza". In Isaac, Rami K.; Hall, C. Michael; Higgins-Desbiolles, Freya (eds.). The Politics and Power of Tourism in Palestine. Routledge. pp. 137–148. ISBN 978-1-317-58028-7.
- Cobbing, Felicity (2025). "Saved Treasures of Gaza – 5000 Years of History from April 3rd to November 2nd, 2025, Institut du monde arabe, Paris". Palestine Exploration Quarterly. 157 (3): 272–274. doi:10.1080/00310328.2025.2538980.
- Elter, René; Hassoune, Ayman (2004). "Le monastère de Saint-Hilarion à Umm-el-'Amr (bande de Gaza)" [The Monastery of Saint Hilarion in Umm el-Amr (Gaza Strip)]. Comptes rendus des séances de l'Académie des Inscriptions et Belles-Lettres (in French). 148 (1): 359–382. doi:10.3406/crai.2004.22712.
- Hirschfeld, Yizhar (2004). "The monasteries of Gaza: An archaeological review". In Bitton-Ashkelony, Brouria; Kofsky, Aryeh (eds.). Christian Gaza in Late Antiquity. Brill. pp. 61–88. doi:10.1163/9789047405412_006. ISBN 9789004138681.
- Pringle, Denys (1993). The Churches of the Crusader Kingdom of Jerusalem: A Corpus: Volume 2, L-Z (excluding Tyre). Cambridge University Press. ISBN 978-0-521-39037-8.
