= Tell Umm el-'Amr =

Archaeological site in Deir al-Balah Governorate, Palestine

Tell Umm Amer
UNESCO World Heritage Site
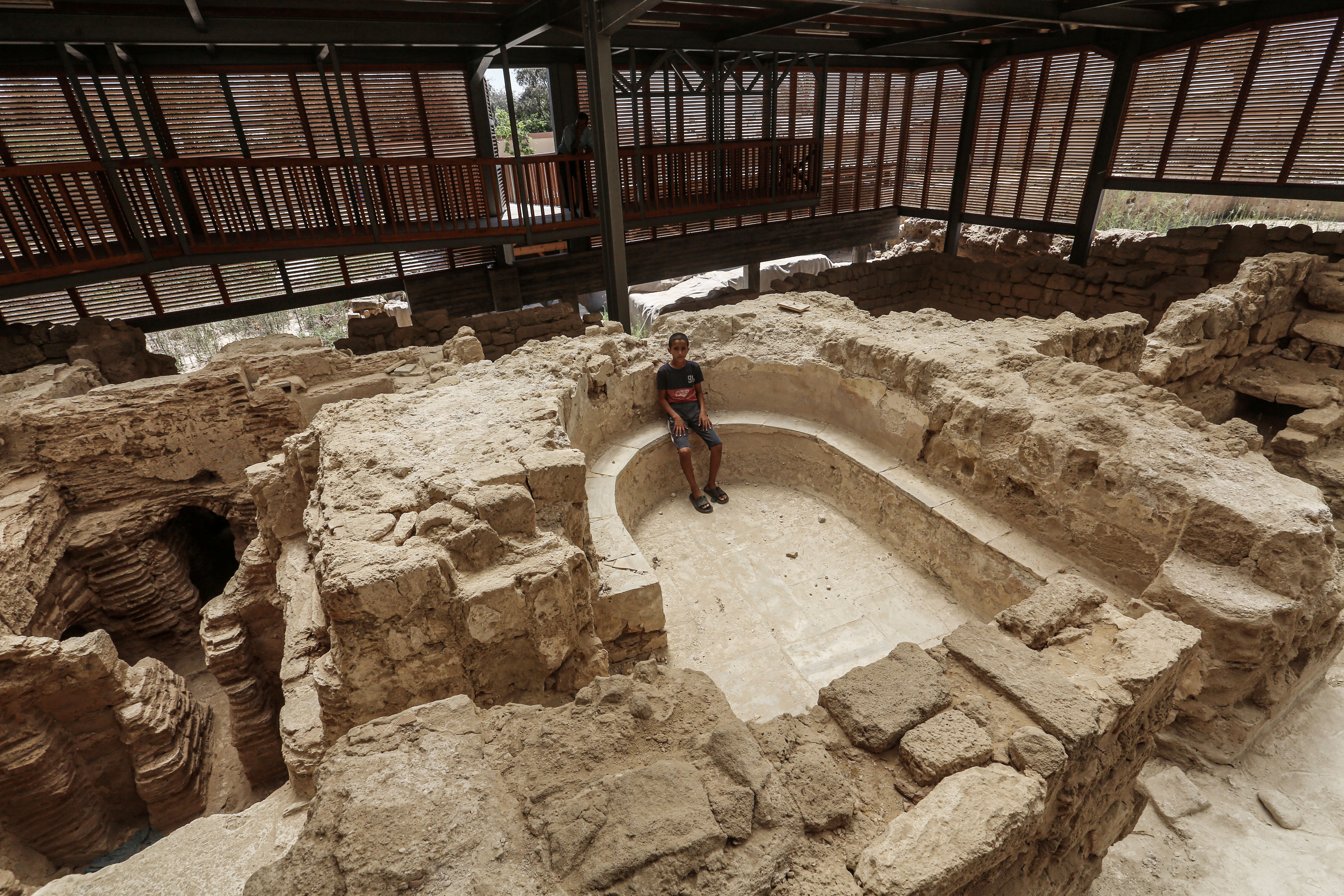
- Part of the bath complex at Tell Umm el-'Amr
- Interactive map of Tell Umm Amer
- Official name: Saint Hilarion Monastery/Tell Umm Amer
- Location: Nuseirat refugee camp, Deir al-Balah Governorate, Gaza Strip, Palestine
- Includes: Saint Hilarion Monastery
- Criteria: Cultural: (ii), (iii), (vi)
- Reference: 1749
- Coordinates: 31°26′50″N 34°21′59″E

Tell Umm el-'Amr, also known as Tell Umm Amer, is an archaeological site in the Nuseirat refugee camp, Gaza Strip, Palestine. The site contains the Saint Hilarion Monastery, which was established in the 4th century. Tell Umm el-'Amr (including the monastery) was designated a UNESCO World Heritage Site in 2024 and was simultaneously added to the 'In Danger' list.

== Location ==
Tell Umm el-ʿAmr is located in the dune landscapes south of the mouth of the Wadi Ghazzeh in the area of the Al Nusairat refugee camp, about 5.3 miles (8.5 km) south of Gaza City. The distance to the Mediterranean coast is 300–700 metres (980–2,300 ft). In the east and southeast of the Tell Umm el-'Amr site, there are palm groves that form a border with the neighboring town of Deir al-Balah. The archaeological site covers an area of approximately 14,000 square metres (150,000 sq ft).

== History ==
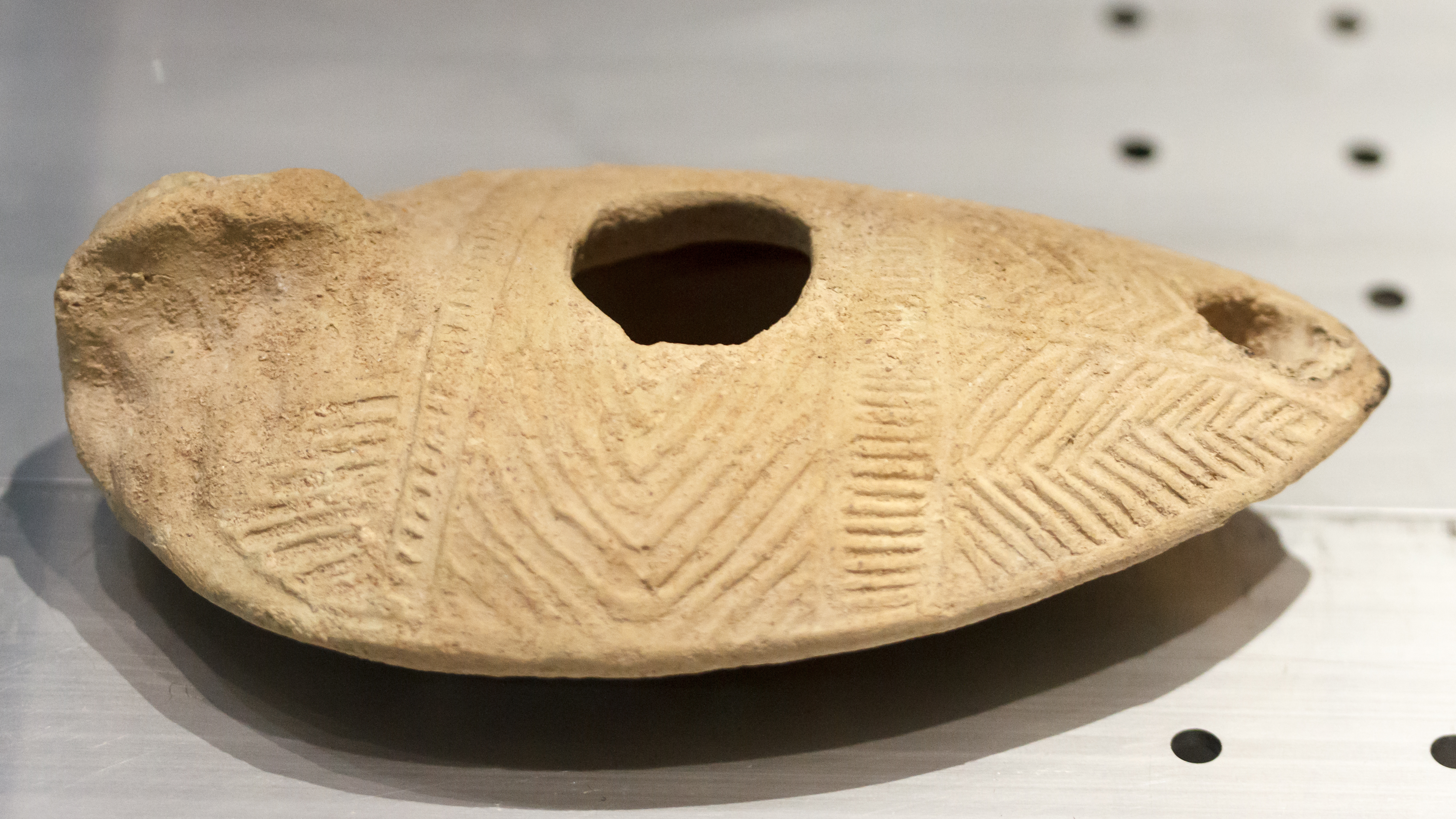
A 13th- or 14th-century lamp in the shape of a slipper discovered at Tell Umm el-Amr and exhibited at Saved Treasures of Gaza: 5000 Years of History

Uncovered by local archaeologists in 1999, the Tell Umm el-'Amr site was active from the 4th to the 8th century and contains Christian artifacts. The ancient village of Tabatha was once located there. The site consists of the monastery of Saint Hilarion; as well as religious buildings (e.g. church, cloister) and all the outbuildings necessary for the life of the monks (e.g. miscellaneous room, dormitory). Additionally, the archaeologists found a hotel complex and baths probably used by visiting pilgrims at the site.

=== Preservation and protection ===
In 2013, fundraising was launched in order to be able to carry out excavations on the site and put in place protection measures.

The British Council's Cultural Protection Fund funded a conservation programme at Tell Umm el-'Amr.

In 2024, a request for UNESCO world heritage status was submitted. Following their addition in July 2024, both Tell Umm el-'Amr and Saint Hilarion Monastery were included on the List of World Heritage in Danger by UNESCO.

== See also ==
- List of archaeological sites in the Gaza Strip
