= Avi Gopher =

Israeli archaeologist

Avi Gopher (Hebrew: אבי גופר) is an Israeli archaeologist. He is a professor at the University of Tel Aviv.

== Biography ==
Avraham (Avi) Gopher completed his B.A. at Hebrew University of Jerusalem in 1978, M.A. in 1981 and PhD in 1986. He specialises in prehistoric Israel.

== Archaeology career ==
Gopher's work at Qesem with Ran Barkai and Israel Hershkovitz received considerable press coverage. The team claimed to have discovered the oldest homo sapiens remains ever found at the cave near Rosh HaAyin in central Israel. Their paper, published in the American Journal of Physical Anthropology, states that the human teeth they discovered are between 400,000 and 200,000 years old although it was impossible to definitely identify the particular species of human. In an interview, Gopher said "they definitely leave all options open. There's been a tendency for people to get so accustomed to the "out of Africa" hypothesis that they use it exclusively and explain any finding that doesn't fit it as evidence of yet another wave of migration out of Africa."

Gopher and agronomist Shahal Abbo of the Hebrew University of Jerusalem have written a book that challenges the scientific consensus over the domestication of wild plants. They contend that the process of domestication was rapid, well-planned and organized, and that several plant species were domesticated in a single location.

== Fieldwork ==
- 1977-1980 - Excavations with Prof. Ofer Bar-Yosef and Prof. Nigel Goring-Morris of projects in the southern Sinai such as Abu Madi.
- 1979 - Excavations at Qadesh Barnea 3 and Negev Highlands.
- 1977-1979 - Excavations at Hayonim Cave, Galilee, directed by Prof. Ofer Bar-Yosef.
- 1980-1981 - Excavations at Nahal Issaron, Uvda Valley, co-director with Prof. Nigel Goring-Morris.
- 1980-1981 - Excavations at Negev Highlands Project co- director with Prof. Nigel Goring-Morris.
- 1982 - Excavations at Ain Qadeis, co-director with Prof. S.A. Rosen and Prof. A. N. Goring-Morris.
- 1980-1986 - Netiv HaGdud, West Bank, co-director with Prof. O. Bar-Yosef.
- 1985 - Excavations at Mujahia, Golan Heights.
- 1985-1989 - Excavations at the Upper Galilee Project, Horvat Galil and Nahal Betzet I.
- 1986-1991 - Excavations at the Wadi Qana Cave, West Bank, co-director with Dr. T. Tsuk.
- 1987 - Excavations at Nahal Zehora I, Menashe Heights and Wadi Rabah.
- 1988-1990 - Survey and excavations at Palmahim.
- 1991-1993 - Excavations at Nahal Poleg 18 N.
- 1992 - Excavations at Neve Yarak (Lod), Shephelah.
- 1994-1996 - Excavations at Ain Darat, Judean Desert.
- 1997-1999 - Excavations at Nahal Hadera V, co-director with Dr. R. Barkai.
- 1997-1999 - Excavations at Qumran Cave 24, West Bank.
- 1997-2001 - Survey and excavations in the Central Dishon Valley, co-director with Dr. R. Barkai.
- 2001-2010 - Excavations at Qesem Cave, co-director with Dr. R. Barkai.

== Published works ==
Books

- Gopher, A., The flint assemblages of Munhata - final report. Les Cahiers Du Centre de Recherche Francais de Jerusalem, Vol. 4. Association Paléorient, Paris. 162 pp.; 59 Figs.; 8 Plates., 1989.
- Gopher, A., Arrowheads of the Neolithic Levant - A Seriation Analysis. ASOR - American Schools for Oriental Research Dissertation Series Vol. 10, Eisenbrauns, Winnona Lake, Indiana. 325 pp.; 101 Figs., 1994.
- Gopher, A. and Orrelle, E., The Groundstone Assemblages of Munhata, A Neolithic site in the Jordan Valley, Israel: A report. Les Cahiers Des Missions Archeologiques Francaises en Iserel, Vol. 7, Association Paléorient, Paris. 183 pp.; 47 Figs.; 10 Plates, 1995.
- Gopher, A. and Tsuk, T., The Nahal Qanah Cave, Earliest Gold in the southern Levant, Monograph Series of the Institute of Archaeology, Vol. 12. Tel Aviv University, Institute of Archaeology Tel Aviv University, Tel Aviv. 250 pp.; 135 Figs.; 11 color Plates., 1996.
- Bar-Yosef, O. and Gopher, A., An Early Neolithic Village in the Jordan Valley, Part I: The Archaeology of Netiv Hagdud. American School of Prehistoric Research Bulletin 43, Peabody Museum of Archaeology and Ethnography, Harvard University. 266 pp.; 165 Figs., 1997.
- Eisenberg, E., Gopher, A. and Greenberg, R., Tel Te'o – A Neolithic, Chalcolithic and Early Bronze Age site in the Hula Valley. Israel Antiquities Authority Report Series no. 13. 250 pp.; 110 Figs.; 30 Plates., 2001.
- Bar-Yosef, O., Goring Morris, A. N. and Gopher, A. (eds.)., Gilgal: Early Neolithic Occupations in the Lower Jordan Valley: The Excvations of Tammar Noy . Oxbow Books, Oxford on behalf of the American School of Prehistoric Research.
- Gopher, A. Forthcoming. Village Communities of the Pottery Neolithic Period in the Menashe Hills, Israel, Archaeological Investigations at the Sites of Nahal Zehora.

Chapters in books, papers and articles

- Bar-Yosef, O. Gopher; Goring-Morris, A.N. (1980). "Netiv Hagdud: A "Sultanian" Mound in the Lower Jordan Valley". Paléorient. 6: 201–206. doi:10.3406/paleo.1980.4269.
- Davis, S.; Goring-Morris, A.N.; Gopher, A. (1982). "Sheep Bones from the Negev Epipaleolithic". Paléorient. 8: 87–93. doi:10.3406/paleo.1982.4313.
- Goring-Morris, A. N.; Gopher, A. (1983). "Nahal Issaron: A Neolithic Settlement in the Southern Negev". Israel Exploration Journal. 33: 149–162.
- Kislev, M. E.; Bar-Yosef, O.; Gopher, A. (1985). "Early Neolithic Domesticated and Wild Barley from Netiv Hagdud Region in the Lower Jordan Valley". Israel Journal of Botany. 35: 197–201.
- Gopher, A.; Greenberg, R. (1987). "Pottery Neolithic Levels at Tel Dan. Mitekufat Haeven". Mitekufat Haeven - Journal of the Israel Prehistoric Society. 20: 91–113. doi:10.61247/s436780.
- Bar-Yosef, O.; Gopher, A.; Nadel, D. (1987). "The "Hagdud Truncation" - A new type from the Sultanian Industry at Netiv Hagdud, Jordan Valley". Mitekufat Haeven - Journal of the Israel Prehistoric Society. 20: 151–157. doi:10.61247/s945998.
- Hershkovitz, I.; Gopher, A. (1988). "Human burials from Horvat Galil: A PPNB site in the Upper Galilee Israel". Paléorient. 14: 119–126. doi:10.3406/paleo.1988.4446.
- Gopher, A (1988). "The Flint industry from Tel Tsaf. Tel Aviv, Journal of the Tel Aviv University Institute of". Archeology. 15–16: 37–46.
- Gopher, A., Horvat Galil and Nahal Beset I: Two Neolithic Sites in the Upper Galilee . Mitekufat Haeven, Journal or the Israel Prehistoric Society Vol. 22: 82–92, 1989.
- Gopher, A.; Orrelle, E. (1989). "The flint industry of Nahal Zehora, a Wadi Raba site in the Menashe Hills". Bulletin of the American Schools of Oriental Research. 276 (276): 67–76. doi:10.2307/1356852. JSTOR 1356852. S2CID 163280331.
- Gopher, A., Neolithic Arrowheads of the Levant: Results and Implications of a multidimensional seriation analysis. In: Aurench, O., Cauvin, M.C. and Sanlaville, P. (eds.) Préhistoire Du Levant - Processus des Changements Culturels. Association Paléorient, Paris, pp. 47–60, 1989.
- Gopher, A., Diffusion processes in the Pre-Pottery Neolithic Levant: The case of the Helwan Point. In: Hershkovitz, I. (ed.) People and Culture in Change, Proceedings of the 2nd symposium on Upper Paleolithic, Mesolithic and Neolithic populations in Europe and the Mediterranean basin. BAR International series 508, Oxford, pp. 91–105, 1989.
- Gopher, A.; Tsuk, T.; Shalev, S.; Gophna, R. (1990). "Earliest Gold Artifacts discovered in the Southern Levant". Current Anthropology. 31 (4): 436–443. doi:10.1086/203868. S2CID 143173212.
- Belfer-Cohen, A.; Arensburg, B.; Gopher, A.; Bar-Yosf, O. (1990). "Human remains from Netiv Hagdud, a Pre Pottery Neolithic A site in the Jordan Valley". Mitekufat Haeven - Journal of the Israel Prehistoric Society. 23: 79–85. doi:10.61247/s557027.
- Gopher, A., Mujahia - An early Pre-Pottery Neolithic B site in the Golan Heights. Tel Aviv, Journal of the Institute of Archaeology of Tel Aviv University vol. 17(2): 115–143.
- Hershkovitz, I. and Gopher, A. 1990. Paleodemography, burial customs and food-producing economy at the beginning of the Holocene: A perspective from the southern Levant. Mitekufat Haeven - Journal of the Israel Prehistoric Society Vol. 23: pp. 9–47, 1990.
- Nadel, D.; Bar-Yosef, O.; Gopher, A. (1991). "Early Neolithic Arrowhead Types in the Southern Levant a Typological Suggestion". Paléorient. 17: 109–119. doi:10.3406/paleo.1991.4544.
- Bar-Yosef, O.; Gopher, A.; Kislev, M.; Tchernov, E. (1991). "Netiv Hagdud - an Early Neolithic Village Site in the Jordan Valley". Journal of Field Archaeology. 18 (4): 405–424. Bibcode:1991JFArc..18..405B. doi:10.1179/009346991791549077.
- Gopher, A.; Sadeh, S.; Goren, Y. (1992). "The pottery assemblage of Nahal Beset I: A Neolithic site in the Upper Galilee". Israel Exploration Journal. 42: 4–16.
- Yellin, J.; Gopher, A. (1992). "The origin of the obsidian artifacts from Mujahia- A PPNB site in the Golan Heights. Tel Aviv". Journal of the Institute of Archaeology of Tel Aviv University. 19: 94–99. doi:10.1179/tav.1992.1992.1.94.
- Galili, E.; Weinstein-Evron, Hershkovitz; Gopher, A.; Lernau, H.; Kislev, M.; Kolska-Horwitz, L.; Lernau, H. (1993). "Atlit-Yam: A Prehistoric Site on the Sea Floor off the Israeli Coast". Journal of Field Archaeology. 20 (2): 133–157. Bibcode:1993JFArc..20..133G. doi:10.1179/jfa.1993.20.2.133.
- Gopher, A.; Gophna, R. (1993). "Cultures of the Eight and Seventh Millennia BP in Southern Levant: A Review for the 1990s". Journal of World Prehistory. 7 (3): 297–353. doi:10.1007/bf00974722. S2CID 162194108.
- Gopher, A (1993). "6th - 5th millennia B.C. settlements in the Coastal Plain - Israel". Paléorient. 19 (1): 55–64. doi:10.3406/paleo.1993.4583.
- Goren, Y., Gopher, A. and Goldberg, P., The beginnings of pottery production in the southern Levant: technological and social aspects. In: Biran, A. and Aviram, J. (eds.) Biblical Archaeology today 1990, proceedings of the 2nd International congress on biblical archaeology, Jerusalem, June 1990, Pre-Congress Symposium: supplement. The Israel Exploration Society, Jerusalem, pp. 33–40, 1993.
- Carmi, I.; Segal, D.; Goring-Morris, A.N.; Gopher, A. (1994). "Dating the prehistoric site Nahal Isaaron in the southwestern Negev, Israel". Radiocarbon. 36 (3): 391–398. doi:10.1017/s0033822200014569.
- Gopher, A., Pottery Neolithic 6th - 5th millennia B.C. industries of the Southern Levant seen through PPN glasses. In: Gebel, H.G. and Kozlowski, S. (eds.) Neolithic chipped stone industries of the Fertile Crescent Studies in Early Near Eastern Production, Subsistence and Environment No. 1, Berlin, Ex Oriente, pp. 563–567, 1994.
- Gopher, A., Goring-Morris, A.N. and Gordon, D., Nahal Issaron, the lithics of the later PPNB occupation. In: Gebel, H.G. and Kozlowski, S. (eds.) Neolithic chipped stone industries of the Fertile Crescent Studies in Early Near Eastern Production, Subsistence and Environment No. 1, Berlin, Ex Oriente, pp. 479–495, 1994.
- Goring-Morris, A.N., Gopher, A. and Rosen, S.A., The Neolithic Tuwailan cortical knife industry of the Negev, Israel. In: Gebel, H.G. and Kozlowski, S. (eds.) Neolithic chipped stone industries of the Fertile Crescent Studies in Early Near Eastern Production, Subsistence and Environment No. 1, Berlin, Ex Oriente, pp. 511–525, 1994.
- Gopher, A., Central and Southern Levant PPN cultural Sequences: time-space systematics through typological and stylistic approaches. In: Gebel, H.G. and Kozlowski, S. (eds.) Neolithic chipped stone industries of the Fertile Crescent Studies in Early Near Eastern Production, Subsistence and Environment No. 1, Berlin, Ex Oriente, pp. 387–393, 1994.
- Barkai, R., Burian, F., Friedman, E. and Gopher, A., 18-X - An Epipaleolithic collection from the Nahal Poleg area. Mitekufat Haeven - Journal of the Israel Prehistoric Society. Vol. 26: 64–73, 1994–5.
- Gopher, A., Goring-Morris, A.N. and Rosen, S.A., Ein Qadis I: A Pre-Pottery Neolithic B Occupation in Eastern Sinai. Atiqot vol. XXVII: 15–33. Antiquities Authority of Israel, Jerusalem, 1995.
- Gopher, A., Ain Darat - A PPNA site in the Judean Desert, lithic assemblages of the 1994 season. Neo - Lithics 1/1995: 7–8, 1995.
- Gopher, A., Early Pottery - Bearing Groups in Israel - the Pottery Neolithic Period. In: Levy, T. A. (ed.) The Archaeology of Society in the Holy Land. Leicester University Press, London, pp. 205–225, 1995.
- Goren, Y. and Gopher, A., The beginnings of pottery production in the Southern Levant: A model. In: Vincenzini, T. (ed.) The Ceramic Cultural Heritage, Techna Monographs in Materia and Society 2. Florence, pp. 21–28, 1995.
- Gopher, A. and Orrelle, E., New Data on Burials from the Pottery Neolithic Period (sixth-fifth Millennium BC ) in Israel. In Campbell, S. and Green, A. (eds.) The Archaeology of Death in the Ancient Near East. Oxbow Monograph 51, pp. 24–29, 1995.
- Perrot, J.; Gopher, A. (1996). "A Late Neolithic site near Ashkelon". Israel Exploration Journal. 46 (3–4): 145–166.
- Gopher, A.; Orrelle, E. (1996). "An alternative interpretation for material imagery of the Yarmukian, a Neolithic culture of the sixth millennium B.C. in the southern Levant". Cambridge Archaeological Journal. 6 (2): 255–279. doi:10.1017/s0959774300001736. S2CID 162549116.
- Gopher, A. and Greenberg, R., The Pottery Neolithic Levels. In: Biran, A., Ilan, D. and Greenberg, R. (eds.) Dan I: A Chronicle of the Excavation, the Neolithic, the Early Bronze Age and the Middle Bronze Age Toombs. Hebrew Union College Annual Series, Jerusalem, pp. 67–81, 1996.
- Gopher, A., Infant burials in the Neolithic periods in the Southern Levant-Israel: A social view. In: Otte, M. (ed.) Nature et Culture, Actes du Colloque International, Liège, December 1993, pp. 913–918, 1996.
- Gopher, A., What happened to the Early PPNB? In: Kozlowski, S.K and Gebel, H.G. (eds.) Neolithic chipped stone industries of the Fertile Crescent and their contemporaries in adjacent regions. Studies in Early Near Eastern production, subsistence and environment 3, Berlin, ex Oriente, pp. 151–158, 1996.
- Gopher, A., A preliminary report on the flints from Ain Darat: a PPNA site in the Judean Desert. In: S. K. Kozlowski, S.K and Gebel, H.G. (eds.) Neolithic chipped stone industries of the Fertile Crescent and their contemporaries in adjacent regions. Studies in Early Near Eastern production, subsistence and environment 3, Berlin, ex Oriente, pp. 443–452, 1996.
- Gopher, A., Horvat Galil - An Early PPNB site in the Upper Galilee, Israel. Tel Aviv, Journal of the Institute of Archaeology Tel Aviv University 24 (2): 183–222, 1997.
- Gopher, A. and Barkai, R., Here are the microliths: a reply to "where are the microliths?" Neo-Lithics 1/97: 16–18, 1997.
- Barkai, R. and Gopher, A., Transversal burins from Nahal Zehora I, A Pottery Neolithic site in central Israel. Neo-Lithics 1/97: 20–23, 1997.
- Barkai, R., Gopher, A. and Friedman, E., Prehistoric occurrences in the western Samaria, the 1967-1968 survey. In: Finkelstein, I. and Lederman, Z. Highlands of many Cultures, The southern Samaria Survey, The Sites, pp. 857–881, 1997.
- Gopher, A. and Tsuk, T., Nahal Qanah Cave: a unique Chalcolithic burial Cave in West Samaria. In: Bansall, C. and Tolan-Smith C. (eds.) The Human Use of Caves, BAR International Series 667, Proceedings of the conference on the human use of caves, New Castle, July, 1993, pp. 167–174, 1997.
- Gopher, A., Burian, F. and Friedman, E., Prehistoric sites on the northern bank of Nahal Poleg: Site 18M revisited. Mitekufat Haeven - Journal of the Israel Prehistoric Society Vol. 28: 81–104, 1998.
- Gopher, A. and Goring-Morris A. N., Abu Salem: A Pre Pottery Neolithic B camp in the Central Negev Highlands, Israel. Bulletin of the American School for Oriental Research 312: 1-20, 1998.
- Barkai, R. and Gopher, A., Reintroducing butt scrapers (racloire sur talon): another look at a non-formal tool type. Lithic Technology 23(1): 20–26, 1998.
- Gopher, A., Orrelle, E., Blockman, N., Barkai, R., Eyal, R. and Naveh, D., The Nahal Zehora village sites: Pottery Neolithic in the Menashe Hills, Israel In: Proceedings of the XIII UISPP, Forli, Italy, pp. 465–468, 1998.
- Eyal, R., Naveh, D. and Gopher, A., Pottery vessel handles from Nahal Zehora I and II: an Attribute analysis. In: Proceedings of the XIII UISPP, Forli, Italy, pp. 475–481, 1998.
- Blockman, N. and Gopher, A., The Lodian (Jericho XI) assemblage of Newe Yarak - Lod. In: Proceedings of XIII UISPP, Forli, Italy, pp. 489–495, 1998.
- Gopher, A., Barkai, R. and Marder, O., Cultural contacts in the Neolithic period: Anatolian obsidians in the southern Levant. In: Otte, M. (ed.) Prehistoire d'Anatolie, Genèse des Deux Mondes. Liège, ERAUL 85, pp. 641–650, 1998.
- Gopher, A.; Orrelle, E. (1999). "Coffee Beans, Cowries and Vulvas: A Reply to Comments by Y. Garfinkel". Cambridge Archaeological Journal. 9 (1): 133–137. doi:10.1017/s0959774300015262. S2CID 163047726.
- Barkai, R.; Gopher, A. (1999). "The last Neolithic industry - the flint assemblages of Nahal Zehora I, a Wadi Rabah site In the Menashe Hills, Israel". Mitekufat Haeven - Journal of the Israel Prehistoric Society. 29: 41–122. doi:10.61247/s381128.
- Frumkin, A., Carmi, I., Gopher, A., Ford, D. C., Schwarcz, H. P. and Tsuk, T., Holocene millennial-scale climatic cycle from Nahal Qanah Cave speleothem, Israel. The Holocene 9.6 special issue, pp. 677–682, 1999.
- Gopher, A., Lithic industries of the Neolithic period in the southern Levant: a review. In: Kozlowski S. K. The Eastern Wing of the Fertile Crescent, Late Prehistory of the Greater Mesopotamian Lithic Industries. BAR International Series 760, Oxford, Archeopress, pp. 116–138, 1999.
- Hershkovitz, I. and Gopher, A., Is tuberculosis associated with early domestication of cattle: Evidence from the Levant. In: Pálfi, G., Dutour, O., Deák, J. and Hutás, I. (eds). Tuberculosis Past and Present. TB Foundation. pp. 445–449, 1999.
- Lev-Yadun, S.; Gopher, A.; Abbo, S. (2000). "The Cradle of Agriculture". Science. 288 (5471): 1602–1603. doi:10.1126/science.288.5471.1602. PMID 10858140. S2CID 86661579.
- Shimelmitz, R., Barkai, R. and Gopher, A., A Canaanean Blade Workshop at Har Haruvim, Israel. Tel Aviv Journal of the Institute of Archaeology Tel Aviv University Vol. 27(1): 3-22, 2000.
- Orrelle, E. and Gopher, A., The Pottery Neolithic period: Questions about pottery decoration, symbolism and meaning. In: Kuijt, I. (ed). Life in Neolithic Farming Communities, Plenum Press. pp. 295–308, 2000.
- Gopher, A. Abbo, S. Lev-Yadun, S., The "when", the "where" and the "why" of the Neolithic Revolution in the Levant. Documenta Praehistoria volume (XXVIII) edited by M. Budja. pp. 49–62, 2001.
- Shimelmitz, R; Barkai, R. and Gopher, A., An EpiPaleolithic occurrence at the site of ‘ Ain Miri, Northern Israel. Neo- Lithics 1/01: 4–5, 2001.
- Yamada, S., Goring-Morris, A. N., Gopher, A. and Perron, T., Analysis of faintly glossed blades from Pre-Pottery Neolithic Nahal Issaron, Israel. In: Caneva, I. Lemorini, C. Zampetti, D. and Biagi, P. (eds.) Beyond tools, redefining the PPN lithic assemblages of the Levant. Berlin, ex oriente, pp. 183–204, 2001.
- Gopher, A., Barkai, R. and Asaf, A., Trends in sickle blade production in the Neolithic of the Hula Valley, Israel. In: Caneva, I. Lemorini, C. Zampetti, D. and Biagi, P. (eds.), Beyond tools, redefining the PPN lithic assemblages of the Levant. Berlin, ex oriente, pp. 411–426, 2001.
- Barkai, R. and Gopher, A., Flint quarries in the southern Levantine Holocene: a routine procedure? New evidence form the upper Galilee, Israel. In: Caneva, I. Lemorini, C. Zampetti, D. and Biagi, P. (eds.), Beyond tools, redefining the PPN lithic assemblages of the Levant. Berlin, ex oriente, pp. 17–26, 2001.
- Barkai, R.; Gopher, A.; La Porta, P. (2002). "Palaeolithic landscape of extraction: flint surface quarries and workshops at Mt. Pua, Israel". Antiquity. 76 (293): 72–80. doi:10.1017/S0003598X00091110. S2CID 163126366.
- Galili, E.; Rosen, B.; Gopher, A.; Kolska-Horwitz, L. (2002). "The Emergence and dispersion of the Eastern Mediterranean Fishing Village: Evidence from Submerged Neolithic Settlements off the Carmel Coast, Israel". Journal of Mediterranean Archaeology. 15 (2): 167–198. doi:10.1558/jmea.v15i2.167.
- Gopher, A., Greenberg, R. and Herzog, Z., Archaeological Public Policy. In: Korn, D. (ed.), Public Policy in Israel: Perspectives and Practices, Lanham, Lexington Books, pp. 191–204, 2002.
- Abbo, S.; Shtienberg, D.; Lichtenzweig, J. Lev-Yadun; Gopher, A. (2003). "The chickpea, summer cropping, and a new model for pulses domestication in the ancient Near East". Quarterly Review of Biology. 78 (4): 37–50. CiteSeerX 10.1.1.498.3128. doi:10.1086/378927. PMID 14737827. S2CID 14768608.
- Barkai, R.; Gopher, A.; Lauritzen, S.E.; Frumkin, A. (2003). "Uranium series dates from Qesem Cave, Israel, and the end of the Lower Palaeolithic". Nature. 423 (6943): 977–979. Bibcode:2003Natur.423..977B. doi:10.1038/nature01718. PMID 12827199. S2CID 4415446.
- Godfrey-Smith, D.I.; Vaughan, K.B.; Gopher, A.; Barkai, R. (2003). "Direct luminescence chronology of the Epi-Paleolithic Kebaran site of Nahal Hadera V, Israel". Geoarchaeology. 18 (4): 461–475. Bibcode:2003Gearc..18..461G. doi:10.1002/gea.10073. S2CID 129930963.
- Lev-Tov, N.; Gopher, A.; Smith, P. (2003). "Dental evidence for dietary practices in the Chalcolithic period: the findings from a Burial cave in Peqi'in (northern Israel)". Paléorient. 29 (1): 121–134. doi:10.3406/paleo.2003.4758.
- Yerkes, R.W.; Barkai, R.; Gopher, A.; Bar-Yosef, O. (2003). "Microwear analysis of early Neolithic (PPNA) axes and bifacial tools from Netiv Hagdud in the Jordan Valley, Israel". Journal of Archaeological Science. 30 (8): 1051–1066. Bibcode:2003JArSc..30.1051Y. doi:10.1016/s0305-4403(03)00007-4.
- Rosen, S. A. and Gopher, A., Flint tools from the survey. In: Beit-Arieh, I. (ed). Archaeology of Sinai, The Ophir Expedition. Tel Aviv University, Tel Aviv. pp. 184–195, 2003.
- Eshed, V.; Gopher, A.; Galili, E.; Hershkovitz, I. (2004). "Musculoskeletal Stress Markers in Natufian Hunter-Gatherers and Neolithic Farmers in the Levant: The Upper Limb". American Journal of Physical Anthropology. 123 (4): 303–315. Bibcode:2004AJPA..123..303E. doi:10.1002/ajpa.10312. PMID 15022359.
- Eshed, V.; Gopher, A.; Gage, T. B.; Hershkovitz, I. (2004). "Has the Transition to agriculture Reshaped the Demographic Structure of Prehistoric Populations? New Evidence from the Levant". American Journal of Physical Anthropology. 124 (4): 315–329. Bibcode:2004AJPA..124..315E. doi:10.1002/ajpa.10332. PMID 15252860.
- Gopher, A. and Blockman, N., Excavations at Neolithic Lod (Newe Yarak) and the Lodian culture of the Pottery Neolithic period. Atiquot (English Series) 47: 1-50, 2004.
- Verri, G.; Barkai, R.; Bordeanu, C.; Gopher, A.; Hass, M.; Kaufman, A.; Kubik, P. Montanari; Paul, M.; Ronen, A.; Weiner, S.; Boaretto, E. (2004). "Flint Mining in Prehistory Recorded by in Situ Produced Cosmogenic 10 Be". Proceedings of the National Academy of Sciences of the United States of America. 101 (21): 7880–7884. doi:10.1073/pnas.0402302101. PMC 419525. PMID 15148365.
- Shimelmitz, R.; Barkai, R.; Gopher, A. (2004). "The Geometric Kebaran Microlithic Assemblage of Ain Miri, Northern Israel". Paléorient. 30 (2): 27–140. doi:10.3406/paleo.2004.1016.
- Galili, E., Gopher, A., Rosen, A. and Kolska-Horwitz, L., The Emergence of the Mediterranean Fishing Village in the Levant and the Anomaly of Neolithic Cyprus. In: Peltenburg, E. and Wasse, A. (Eds.), Neolithic Revolution, Oxbow books, pp. 91–101, 2004.
- Abbo, S.; Gopher, A.; Rubin, B.; Lev-Yadun, S. (2005). "On the origin of Near Eastern founder crops and the 'dump-heap' hypothesis". Genetic Resources and Crop Evolution. 52 (5): 491–495. Bibcode:2005GRCEv..52..491A. doi:10.1007/s10722-004-7069-x. S2CID 23191727.
- Barkai, R.; Gopher, A.; Shimelmitz, R. (2005). "Middle Pleistocene Blade Production in the Levant: An Amudian Assemblage from Qesem Cave, Israel". Eurasian Prehistory. 3: 39–74.
- Galili, E.; Eshed, V.; Gopher, A.; Hershkovitz, I. (2005). "Burial practices at the submerged Pre-Pottery Neolithic C site of Atlit-Yam, northern coast of Israel". Bulletin of the American School of Archaeology. 339: 1–19.
- Gopher, A.; Barkai, R.; Shimelmitz, R.; Khalaily, M.; Lemorini, C.; Hershkovitz, I.; Stiner, M. (2005). "Qesem Cave : An Amudian site in central Israel". Mitekufat Haeven - Journal of the Israel Prehistoric Society. 35: 69–92. doi:10.61247/s795333.
- Verri, G., Barkai, R., Gopher, A., Hass, M., Kubik, P., Paul, M., Ronen, A., Weiner, S., and Boaretto, E., Flint procurement strategies in the Late Lower Palaeolithic recorded by in Situ produced Cosmogenic 10 Be in Tabun and Qesem Caves ( Israel )" Journal of Archaeological Science 32: 207-213, 2005.
- Abbo, S., Shtienberg, D., Lev-Yadun, S. and Gopher, A., Prehistoric Spread of Agrotechniques into the Indian Subcontinent as Deduced from the Evolutionary History of Chickpea: Any Lesson for Modern Crop Improvement? In, Y.L. Nene (ed) Agricultural Heritage of Asia: Proceedings of the International Conference, 6–8 December 2004, Asian Agri-History Foundation, Secunderabad, Andhra Pradesh, India. pp. 197–203, 2005.
- Gopher, A., Burian, F. and Friedman, E., Neolithic coastal sites near Palmahim with some comments ofnthe Neolithic period in the Israel coastal plain. In, M. Fischer (ed), Yavneh, Yavneh-Yam and their Neighborhood, Eretz and Tel Aviv University, Tel Aviv, pp. 17–46, 2005.
- Alahique, F. and Gopher, A., Animal resource exploitation at Qumran Cave 24 ( Dead Sea, Israel ) from the Pre-Pottery Neolithic to the Chalcolithic. In, H. Buitenhuis, A. M. Choyke, L. Martin, L. Bartosiewicz and M. Mashkour (eds.) Archeozoology of the Near East VI, ARC-Publicaties 123: 139-149, 2005.
- Lemorini, C., Gopher, A, Shimelmitz, R., Stiner, M., and Barkai, R., Use-wear analysis of an Amudian laminar assemblage from Acheuleo-Yabrudian Qesem Cave, Israel" Journal of Archaeological Science 33: 921–934, 2006.
- Abbo, S.; Gopher, A.; Peleg, Z.; Saranga, Y.; Fahima, T.; Salamini, F.; Lev-Yadun, S. (2006). ""The Big (agricultural) Bang": The spread of early wheat cultivation". Genome. 49 (8): 861–863. doi:10.1139/g06-049. PMID 17036059.
- Lev-Yadun, S.; Gopher, A.; Abbo, S. (2006). "How and When was Wild Wheat Domesticated?". Science. 313 (296): 296, author reply 296–7. doi:10.1126/science.313.5785.296b. PMID 16857920. S2CID 39447912.
- Eshed, V.; Gopher, A.; Hershkovitz, I. (2006). "Tooth wear and dental pathology at the advent of agriculture: New evidence from the Levant". American Journal of Physical Anthropology. 130 (2): 145–159. Bibcode:2006AJPA..130..145E. doi:10.1002/ajpa.20362. PMID 16353225.
- Gopher, A. and Barkai, R., Flint extraction sites and workshops in prehistoric Galilee, Israel. In: Körlin, G. and Weisgerber, G. Stone Age – Mining Age. Bochum. pp. 91–98, 2006.
- Barkai, R., Gopher, A. and La Porta, P.C., Middle Pleistocene Landscape of Extraction: Quarry and Workshop Complexes in Northern Israel. In: Axe Age: Acheulian Toolmaking - from Quarry to Discard. N. Goren-Inbar, G. Sharon (eds.) Equinox, London, pp. 7–44, 2006.
- Rosenberg, D., Assaf, A., Eyal, R. and Gopher, A., 2006 Beisamoun – the Wadi Rabah Occurrence. Mitekufat Haeven - Journal of the Israel Prehistoric Society 36: 129–137.
- Kerem, Z., Lev-Yadun, S., Gopher, A., Weinberg, P. and Abbo, S., Chickpea domestication in the Neolithic Levant through the nutritional perspective" Journal of Archaeological Science 2007; 34: 1289–1293, 2007.
- Karkanas, P., Shahack-Gross, R., Ayalon, A., Bar-Matthews, M., Barkai, R., Frumkin, A., Gopher, A. and Stiner, M. C., Evidence for habitual use of fire at the end of the Lower Paleolithic: Site-formation processes at Qesem Cave, Israel" Journal of Human Evolution 53: 197–212, 2007.
- Barkai, R., Gopher, A. and Weiner, J., Quarrying flint at Neolithic Ramat Tamar – An experiment. In: Astruc, L., Binder, D. and Briois, F. (eds.) Systèmes des communautés du Néolithiques précéramique au Proche-Orient. Colloque international sur les industries lithiques du Néolithique pré-céramique . Editions APDCA, Antibes, pp. 25–32, 2007.
- Abbo, S., Zezak, I., Schwatrz, E., Lev-Yadun, S. and Gopher, A., Experimental harvesting of wild peas in Israel: Implications for the origins of Near East farming" Journal of Archaeological Science 35: 922–929, 2008.
- Hershkovitz, I. and Gopher, A., Demographic, Biological and Cultural Aspects of the Neolithic Revolution: A View from the Southern Levant. In, JP Bouquet-Appel and O. Bar-Yosef (eds.), The Neolithic Demographic Transition and its consequences. Springer, pp. 441–479, 2008.
- Rosenberg, D.; Assaf, A.; Getzov, N.; Gopher, A. (2008). "Flaked stone discs of the Neolithic and Chalcolithic Periods in the southern Levant". Paléorient. 34 (2): 137–151. doi:10.3406/paleo.2008.5259.
- Abbo, S., Zezak, I., Schwartz, E., Lev-Yadun, S., Kerem, Z. and Gopher, A., Wild Lentil and Chickpea harvest in Israel : bearing on the origins of Near Eastern farming" Journal of Archaeological Science 35: 3172–3177, 2008.
- Barkai, R. and Gopher, A., Changing the face of the earth: Human behavior at Sede Ilan, an extensive Lower-Middle Paleolithic quarry site in Israel. In, B. Adams and B. Blades (eds.), Lithic Materials and Paleolithic Societies. Blackwell Publications, pp. 174–185, 2009.
- Abbo, S.; Saranga, Y.; Peleg, Z.; Kerem, Z.; Lev-Yadun, S.; Gopher, A. (2009). "Reconsidering domestication of legumes versus cereals in the ancient Near East". Quarterly Review of Biology. 84 (1): 29–50. doi:10.1086/596462. PMID 19326787. S2CID 26267943.
- Frumkin, A. Karkanas; Bar-Matthews, M.; Barkai, R.; Gopher, A.; Shahack-Gross, R.; Vaks, A. (2009). "Gravitational deformations and fillings of aging caves: the example of Qesem karst system, Israel". Geomorphology. 106 (1–2): 154–164. Bibcode:2009Geomo.106..154F. doi:10.1016/j.geomorph.2008.09.018.
- Barkai, R.; Lemorini, C.; Shimelmitz, R.; Lev, Z.; Stiner, M.; Gopher, A. (2009). "A blade for all seasons? Making and using Amudian blades at Qesem Cave, Israel". Human Evolution. 24: 57–75.
- Boaretto, E.; Barkai, R.; Gopher, A.; Berna, F.; Kubik, P.; Weiner, S. (2009). "Specialized Flint Procurement Strategies for Hand Axes, Scrapers and Blades in the Late Lower Paleolithic: A 10 Be Study at Qesem Cave, Israel". Human Evolution. 24: 1–12.
- Stiner, C. M.; Barkai, R.; Gopher, A. (2009). "Cooperative hunting and meat sharing 400-200 kya at Qesem Cave, Israel". Proceedings of the National Academy of Sciences of the United States of America. 106 (32): 13207–13212. Bibcode:2009PNAS..10613207S. doi:10.1073/pnas.0900564106. PMC 2726383. PMID 19666542.
- Galili, E.; Eshed, V.; Rosen, B.; Kislev, M. E.; Simchoni, O; Hershkovitz, I.; Gopher, A. (2009). "Evidence for a separated burial ground at the submerged Pottery Neolithic site of Neve-Yam, Israel". Paléorient. 35 (1): 31–46. doi:10.3406/paleo.2009.5276.
- Abbo, S.; Saranga, Y.; Peleg, Z.; Kerem, Z.; Lev-Yadun, S.; Gopher, A. (2009). "Reconsidering domesticationof legumes versus cereals in the ancient Near East". Quarterly Review of Biology. 84 (1): 29–50. doi:10.1086/596462. PMID 19326787. S2CID 26267943.
- Abbo, S.; Lev-Yadun, S.; Gopher, A. (2010). "Yield stability: an agronomic perspective on the origins of Near Eastern agriculture". Vegetation History and Archaeobotany. 19 (2): 143–150. Bibcode:2010VegHA..19..143A. doi:10.1007/s00334-009-0233-7. S2CID 3918604.
- Gopehr, A.; Ayalon, A.; Bar-Matthews, M. Barkai; Frumkin, A.; Karkanas, P.; Shahack-Gross, R. (2010). "The chronology of the late Lower Paleolithic in the Levantbased on U-TH ages of speleothems from Qesem cave, Israel". Quaternary Geochronology. 5 (6): 644–656. Bibcode:2010QuGeo...5..644G. doi:10.1016/j.quageo.2010.03.003.
- Maul, L., Smith, K,. Barkai, R., Barash, A., Karkanas, P., Shahack-Gross, R. and Gopher, A., Microfaunal remains at Middle Pleistocene Qesem Cave, Israel: Preliminary results on small vertebrates, environment and biostratigraphy. Journal of Human Evolution (available online), 2010.
- Hershkovitz, I; Smith, P; Sarig, R; Quam, R; Rodríguez, L; García, R; Arsuaga, J-L; Barkai; Gopher (2010). "Middle Pleistocene dental remains from Qesem Cave, Israel". American Journal of Physical Anthropology. 144 (4): 575–92. doi:10.1002/ajpa.21446. PMID 21404234.
- Barkai; Lemorini, C.; Gopher (2010). "Palaeolithic cutlery 400 000–200 000 years ago: tiny meat-cutting tools from Qesem Cave, Israel". Antiquity. 84: 325.
- Abbo, S., Lev-Yadun, S. Gopher, A., Agricultural origins: centers and noncenters; a Near Eastern reappraisal. Critical Reviews in Plant Sciences 29: pp. 317–328, 2010.
- Gopher, A (2010). "Qadesh Barnea 3, A Neolithic site in the western Negev Highlands: A report". Mitekufat Haeven - Journal of the Israel Prehistoric Society. 40: 183–218.
- Abbo, S., Lev-Yadun, S., Gopher, A., Origin of Near Eastern plant domestication: homage to Claude Lévi-Strauss and " La Pensée Sauvage ", Genetic Resources and Crop Evolution, 2010 (in press).
- Stiner, M., Gopher, A. and Barkai, R., Hearth-side socioeconomics, hunting and paleoecology during the late Lower Paleolithic at Qesem Cave, Israel. Journal of Human Evolution, 2010 (in press).
