= Horvat Galil =

Archaeological site in Israel

- Location within Israel
- 33.041622°N 35.247961°E
- Type: Tell
- Location: Israel

Site notes
- Material: Stone
- Excavation dates: 1986
- Archaeologists: Avi Gopher; I. Hershkovitz
- Public access: yes

Horvat Galil is an archaeological site in the Upper Galilee, Israel, 13 kilometres (8.1 mi) from the coast of the Mediterranean.

== History ==
Horvat Galil was first excavated in 1986 by Professors Avi Gopher and Israel Hershkovitz and consisted of an upper Byzantine layer over a more extensive PPNB layer with which the excavations were primarily concerned. 60 square metres (650 ft^{2}) were initially exposed and dwellings of mud bricks and lime plaster floors were examined. Several burials were found beneath the floors of the dwellings. The lithic assemblage at the site included Helwan, Byblos, Sultanian and even Aswad points and finely denticulated sickle blades, indicating an early pre-pottery inhabitation that is one of the most northern to have been excavated in Israel. Although the site has not been radiocarbon dated, sites with similar sets of tools such as Mujahia and burial customs have been dated to the second half of the 8th millennium BC.

== See also ==
- Archaeology of Israel
