= Kebara 2 =

Hominin fossil

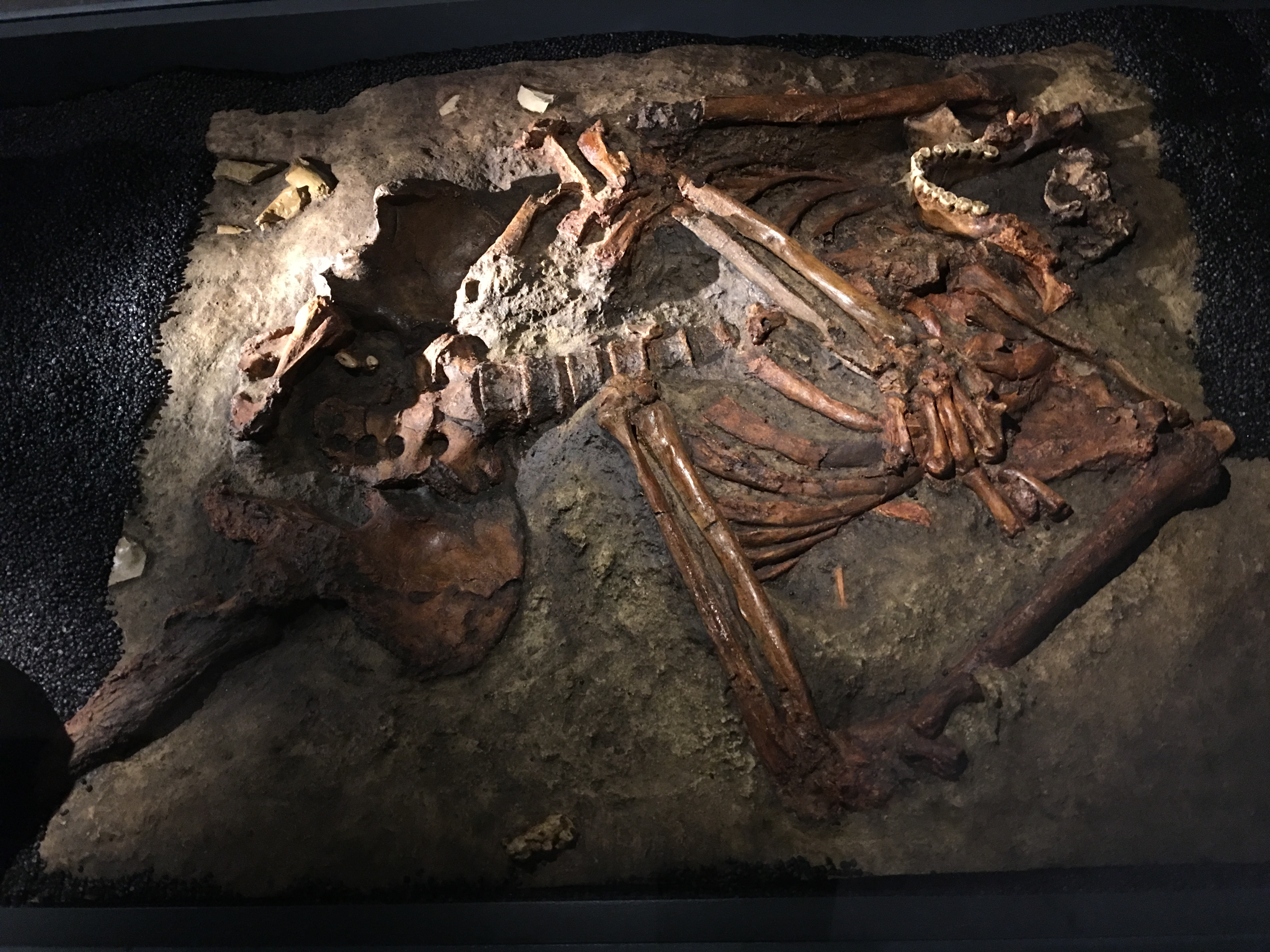
- Kebara 2 replica
- Catalog no.: KMH2
- Common name: Kebara 2
- Species: Neanderthal
- Age: c. 61,000 years
- Place discovered: Kebara Cave, Haifa District, Israel
- Date discovered: 1983
- Discovered by: Ofer Bar-Yosef, Baruch Arensburg, and Bernard Vandermeersch

Kebara 2 (or Kebara Mousterian Hominid 2, KMH2) is a 61,000 year-old Levantine Neanderthal mid-body male skeleton. It was discovered in 1983 by Ofer Bar-Yosef, Baruch Arensburg, and Bernard Vandermeersch in a Mousterian layer of Kebara Cave, Israel. To the excavators, its disposition suggested it had been deliberately buried, though like every other putative Middle Palaeolithic intentional burial, this has been questioned.

Kebara 2 is the most complete post-cranial Neanderthal skeleton ever found and has played a major role in three debates on Neanderthal anatomy and behaviour, namely the anatomical constraints of childbirth, their ability to speak, and the shape and size of their chests. The first of these debates it has helped settle, the second it has not, and the third it has sparked by questioning the barrel-shape that Neanderthal chests were thought to have since they were described by Hermann Schaaffhausen in 1858.

It is currently held at Tel Aviv University.

== Dating ==
Valladas et al. (1987) obtained a thermoluminescence age of 61–59,000 years for Kebara 9's layer, congruent with Schwarcz et al. (1989) who found an age of 64–60,000 years by electron spin resonance.

== Obstetrical constraints ==
The skeleton is male, but because it preserved a nearly complete pelvis, it helped settle in the negative the debate as to whether Neanderthals had different obstetrical (childbirth-related) constraints than those of modern humans.

== Hyoid bone and speech ==
Kebara 2 was the first Neanderthal specimen for which the hyoid bone was preserved, a bone found in the throat and closely related to the vocal tract. Its anatomy was virtually identical to a modern one, leading the excavators to controversially suggest that Neanderthals had at least part of the physical requirements for speech. This debate was hotly divisive, with some authors taking the similarities of Neanderthal and modern hyoid bones to mean that Neanderthal had vocal skills comparable to modern humans, and others pointing out that pigs too have hyoid bones similar to those of modern humans. If indeed Neanderthals could speak, they might have had a narrower-than-modern range of vocal sounds, since the skull base of some Neanderthals resembles those of modern human infants more than adults. (Today many authors believe Neanderthal behaviour is too complex to be explained without at least some form of basic language.)

== Chest shape and size ==
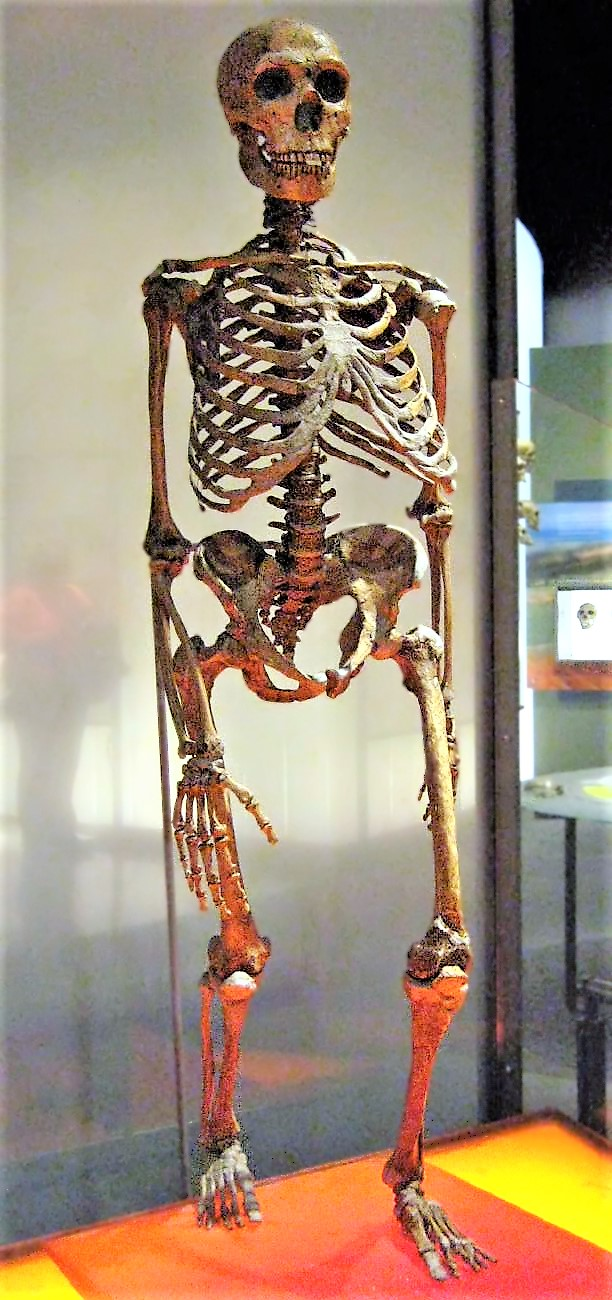
Sawyer and Mayer (2005) used Kebara 2's ribcage and pelvis in their reconstruction of a full Neanderthal skeleton. The skull and most of the remainder is from La Ferrassie 1

Chest shape and size are important in reconstructing the palaeobiology of Neanderthals, the large shape of its thorax having been interpreted as reflecting high activity levels, its adaptation to the cold (though this has been questioned), and a high body mass. Kebara 2's thorax is the only well-preserved Neanderthal ribcage and has been studied extensively.

In 2005, Sawyer and Maley used the Kebara 2 ribcage and pelvis in their full reconstruction of a Neanderthal skeleton. This was the first time a Neanderthal ribcage was rebuilt. The lower rib area flared, giving the whole ribcage a bell-shaped appearance, rather than the barrel-shaped one Neanderthals were for a century and a half thought to have had.

Gómez-Olivencia et al. (2009) used Kebara 2 to reject Franciscus and Churchill's (2002) suggestion that the upper thoraxes of West European Neanderthals, because of their adaptation to the cold, could expand more (along the sagittal plane) than those of Near Eastern Neanderthals.

The authors also found that the upper thorax of Kebara 2 was within modern human range, but that the middle and lower thorax is larger than in modern humans. In 2015, a group of French scientists disagreed, and argued against any major deviation of the Kebara 2 thorax from modern human shape and size. Using a 3D scanner they reported but a few minor differences in the lower ribs.

Researchers worried that bony growths on the ribs of the skeleton were indicative of chronic illness, which could compromise the utility of the specimen for generalizable Neanderthal study. In late 2018, Spanish researchers confirmed that endocostal ossifications on right ribs 5, 6, 7, and possibly 8 were likely the result of a genetic disorder, but did not affect the day-to-day life of Kebara 2.

== Missing cranium ==
Bar-Yosef et al. (1992) suggested that the cranium was deliberately removed sometime after the ligaments that attached it to the spine had decomposed. Indeed, the skull and teeth of most Neanderthal specimens are better preserved than the post-cranial body, especially its fragile bones such as the hyoid and the cervical vertebrae. Having found most of the post-cranial body, one would have expected to find the skull and teeth.
