= Arensburg =

Arensburg may refer to:

- German name of Kuressaare, a town and a municipality on Saaremaa island in Estonia
  - Schutzmannschaft Front Bataillon 36 Arensburg
- Baruch Arensburg (born 1934, Santiago, Chile), anatomist

== See also ==
- Ahrensburg, a town in the district of Stormarn, Schleswig-Holstein, Germany
