= Anna Belfer-Cohen =

Israeli archaeologist (born 1949)

- אנה בלפר-כהן
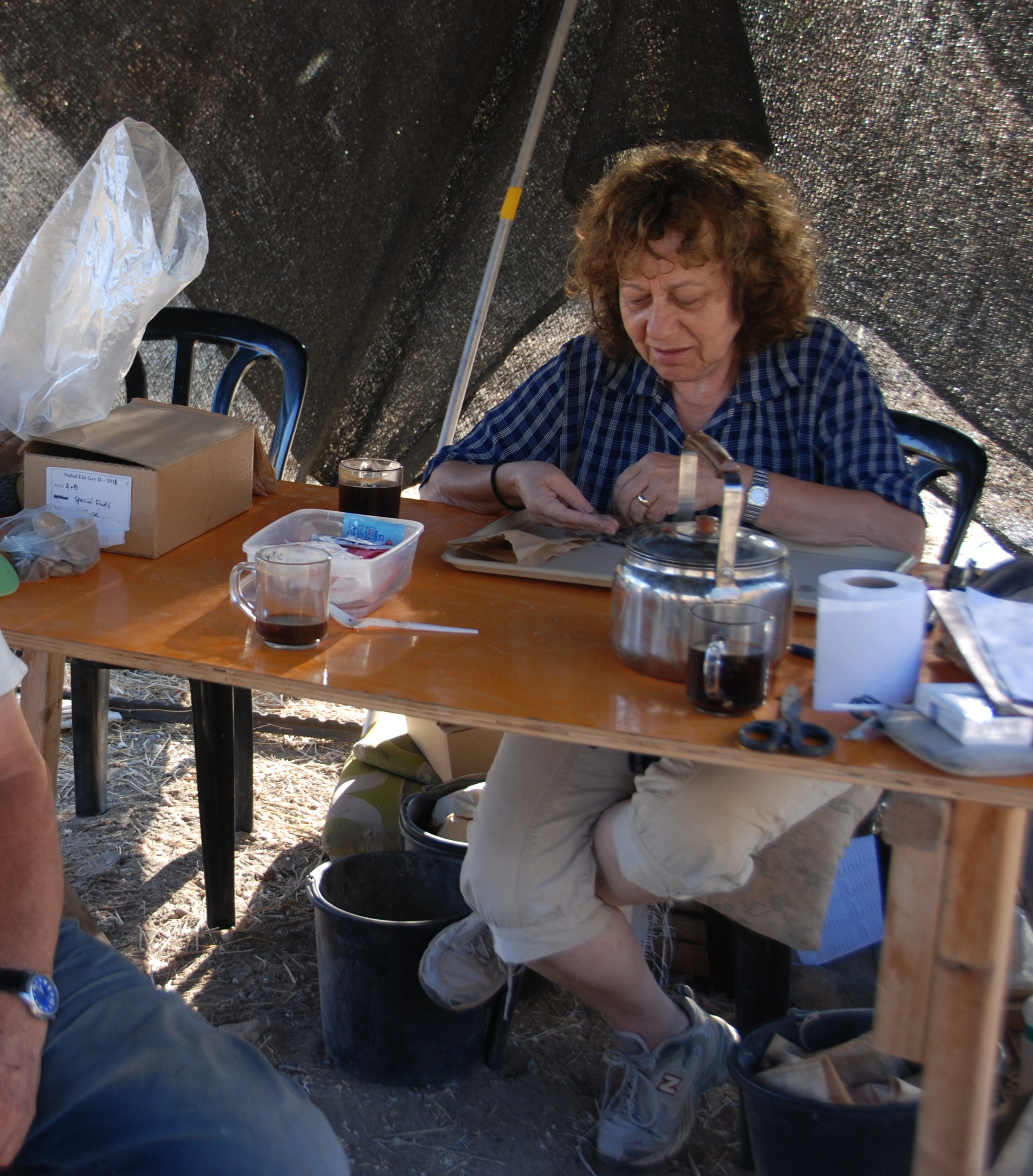
- Anna Belfer-Cohen in the Nahal Ein Gev II excavations, 2011
- Born: November 3, 1949 (age 77); Rivne, Ukraine
- Education: PhD in Archaeology, The Hebrew University of Jerusalem
- Occupations: Archaeologist, Paleoanthropologist
- Known for: Contributions to the study of the Natufian culture and prehistoric archaeology in Israel and the Caucasus
- Notable work: Research on Natufian culture; Excavations at Hayonim Cave, Kebara Cave, and Dzoudzuana Cave
- Title: Professor Emeritus

Anna Belfer-Cohen (Hebrew: אנה בלפר-כהן; born November 3, 1949) is an Israeli archaeologist and paleoanthropologist and Professor Emeritus at the Institute of Archaeology, The Hebrew University of Jerusalem. Belfer-Cohen excavated and studied many important prehistoric sites in Israel including Hayonim and Kebara Caves and open-air sites such as Nahal Ein Gev I and II and Nahal Neqarot. She has also worked for many years in the Republic of Georgia, where she made important contributions to the study of the Paleolithic sequence of the Caucasus following her work at the cave sites of Dzoudzuana, Kotias and Satsrublia. She is a specialist in biological Anthropology, prehistoric art, lithic technology, the Upper Paleolithic and modern humans, the Natufian-Neolithic interface and the transition to village life.

Belfer-Cohen has published hundreds of papers and co-edited several books. Her work is widely cited in the field of Prehistoric Archaeology and especially the Natufian culture.

Belfer-Cohen is married with two children and four grandchildren and currently resides in Jerusalem.

== Early life and education ==
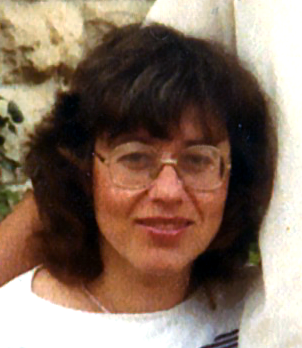

Anna Belfer-Cohen was born in Rivne, Ukraine in 1949 to Halina (Ala) and Yehuda Belfer. The family immigrated to Israel in 1956. After completing high school in her home town Petah Tikva, she began studying toward her first degree in archaeology at the Institute of Archaeology, The Hebrew University of Jerusalem, where she also earned her MA (1981) and PhD (1988). Already in her undergraduate studies she participated in many archaeological expeditions in Israel, Cyprus and Sinai. Belfer-Cohen's PhD dissertation (supervised by Professor Ofer Bar-Yosef) was dedicated to the Natufian culture. She was appointed full professor at the Institute of Archaeology, The Hebrew University of Jerusalem, in 2002. From 2005–2009, she served as the head of the university's Institute of Archaeology. From 2014 to 2018 she was the head of the Authority for Research Students (non-experimental Sciences).

== Scientific contributions ==
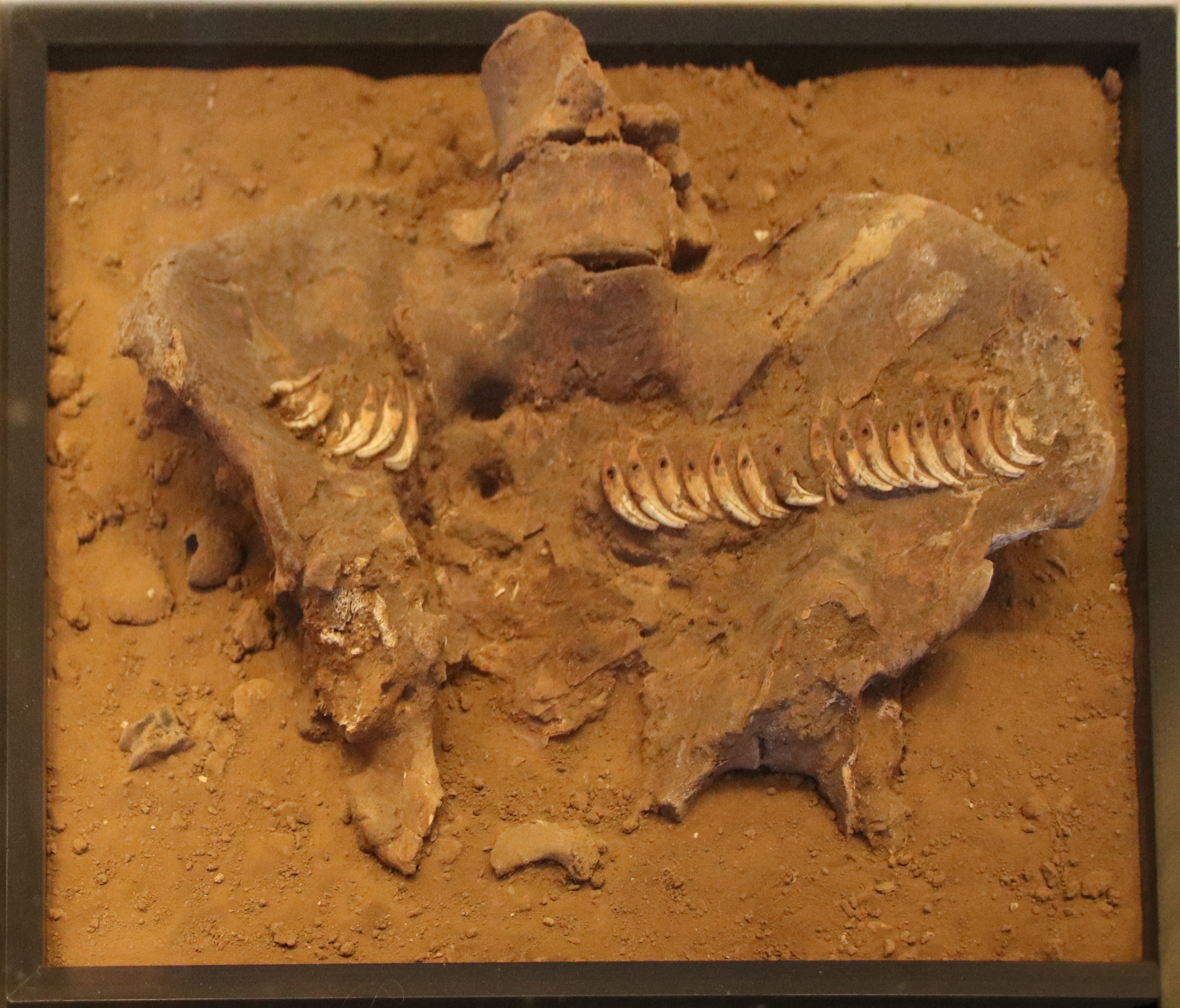
Woman's Pelvis Decorated with Fox Teeth, Natufian Culture, Hayonim Cave

Early in her career, Belfer-Cohen participated in excavations at the Lower Paleolithic site of 'Ubeiydia in the Jordan Valley (the oldest site in Israel), at Upper Paleolithic and Epipaleolithic prehistoric sites in the northern Sinai Desert, at the burial sites from the Chalcolithic age and Early Bronze Age in the southern Sinai.

During her MA studies, Belfer-Cohen analyzed the lithics and bone tools from the Aurignacian layer at Hayonim cave (dated to 35,000 years ago). In her work she identified the Levantine Aurignacian and its uniqueness in the Upper Paleolithic sequence in the area. Through the years she helped understanding the interactions of this hunter-gatherer culture with its European counterpart.

In her PhD Belfer-Cohen discussed the technological and spatial aspects of the Natufian material remains from Hayonim Cave in the Galilee, including architecture, burials, lithic assemblages, ground-stone tools and personal ornaments. In this work she provided the basis for the modern study of the Natufian culture and shaped the important research questions, which are still employed by the current research.

Belfer-Cohen took part in many archaeological projects, some that lasted several decades, such as Kebara and Hayonim caves, where she was involved in the study and publication of the findings. Selected recent research projects and contributions include:

- The First Cemeteries – The nature and meaning of Burial practices in the Natufian Society. Cultural Complexity on the eve of the transition to agriculture. Studies of skeletal material as well as material finds from the sites of Hayonim and Hilazon Tachtit caves jointly with Prof. Leore Grosman (Hebrew University).
- Reconstruction of the Upper Paleolithic to Neolithic sequence of Georgia, the southern Caucasus. This is a joint Georgian-USA-Israeli project directed by her on behalf of the Hebrew University of Jerusalem, in collaboration with Dr. Tengis Meshviliani, Georgia State Museum and Prof. Ofer Bar-Yosef from Harvard University. In this project the team established the chronology of the local Upper Paleolithic, with the arrival of Homo sapiens, and their local adjustment as compared to the Neanderthals of the preceding Middle Paleolithic. The project includes excavations at Dzudzuana cave, 1996-2001; 2006–7. Another central question in the project was aimed at establishing whether the transformation from hunter-gatherers into agriculturalists was an endemic innovation, acculturation of ideas from elsewhere, or the result of invasions of foreign groups. This entailed excavations at the Kotias Klde rockshelter in 2002-2005; 2008–2010. Currently the team excavates at Satsurblia Cave (2010- to present), with Prof. Ron Pinhasi (Vienna University).

== Selected publications ==
- Belfer-Cohen, Anna (1988). "The Natufian Graveyard in Hayonim Cave". Paléorient. 14 (2): 297–308. doi:10.3406/paleo.1988.4476. ISSN 0153-9345. JSTOR 41492321.
- Bar-Yosef, Ofer; Belfer-Cohen, Anna (1989). "The origins of sedentism and farming communities in the Levant". Journal of World Prehistory. 3 (4): 447–498. doi:10.1007/BF00975111. ISSN 1573-7802. S2CID 162966796.
- Belfer-Cohen, Anna (1991). "The Natufian in the Levant". Annual Review of Anthropology. 20: 167–186. doi:10.1146/annurev.an.20.100191.001123. ISSN 0084-6570. JSTOR 2155798. S2CID 145177755.
- Bar-Yosef, Ofer; Belfer-Cohen, Anna (1992). "From Foraging to Farming in the Mediterranean Levant". In Gebauer, Anne Birgitte; Price, T. Douglas (eds.). Transitions to Agriculture in Prehistory. pp. 21–48. OCLC 605693414.
- Belfer-Cohen, A. and E. Hovers 1992 Burial is in the Eye of the Beholder: Middle Palaeolithic and Natufian Burials in the Levant. Current Anthropology 33: 463–71.
- Belfer-Cohen, A. and N. Goren-Inbar 1994 Cognition and Communication in the Levantine Lower Palaeolithic. World Archaeology 26(2):144-157.
- Arensburg, B. and A. Belfer-Cohen 1998 “Sapiens and Neanderthals: Rethinking the Levantine Middle Paleolithic Hominids”. In: Neanderthals and Modern Humans in West Asia, eds. T. Akazawa, K. Aoki and O. Bar-Yosef, pp. 311–322. New-York: Plenum Press.
- Belfer-Cohen, A. and O. Bar-Yosef 2000 Early Sedentism in the Near East - A Bumpy Ride to Village Life”. In: Life in Neolithic Farming Communities. Social Organization, Identity, and Differentiation, ed. I. Kuijt, pp. 19–37. New-York: Kluwer Academic/Plenum Publishers.
- Belfer-Cohen, A. and A. N. Goring-Morris 2002 “Why Microliths? Microlithisation in the Levant”. In: Thinking Small: Global Perspectives on Microlithization, eds. R. G. Elston and S.L. Kuhn, pp. 57–68. Washington, D.C.: American Anthropological Association.
- Goring-Morris, N. and A. Belfer-Coehn. 2003. More Than Meets the Eye. Studies on Upper Palaeolithic Diversity in the Near East, Oxford: Oxbow Books.
- Meshveliani, T., O. Bar-Yosef and A. Belfer-Cohen 2004 “The Upper Palaeolithic in Western Georgia”. In: The Early Upper Paleolithic Beyond Western Europe, eds. P. J. Brantingham, S. L. Kuhn and K. W. Kerry, pp. 129–143. Berkeley: University of California Press.
- Hovers E. and A. Belfer-Cohen 2006 "Now You See it, Now You Don’t" - Modern Human Behavior in the Middle Paleolithic. In: Transitions Before The Transition. Evolution and Stability in the Middle Paleolithic and Middle Stone Age, eds. E. Hovers and S. L. Kuhn, pp. 295–304. New York: Springer.
- Belfer-Cohen, A. and A. N. Goring-Morris 2007. "From the Beginning: Levantine Upper Palaeolithic Cultural Continuity". In: Rethinking the Human Revolution, eds. P. Mellars, K. Boyle, O. Bar-Yosef and C. Stringer, pp. 199–206. Cambridge: McDonald Institute for Archaeological Research University of Cambridge.
- Goring-Morris, A. N., and A. Belfer-Cohen 2010. "Different Ways of Being, Different Ways of Seeing... Changing Worldviews in the Near East". In: Landscapes in Transition: Understanding Hunter-Gatherer and Farming Landscapes in the Early Holocene of Europe and the Levant, eds. B. Finlayson and G. Warren, pp. 9–22. London: Levant Supplementary Series & CBRL.
- Belfer-Cohen, A. and A. N. Goring-Morris 2013. Breaking the Mold: Phases and Facies in the Natufian of the Mediterranean Zone. In: Natufian Foragers in the Levant. Terminal Pleistocene Social Changes in Western Asia. Eds.O. Bar-Yosef and F.R. Valla. Pp. 544–561. Archaeological Series 19. Ann Arbor: International Monographs in Prehistory.
- Kvavadze, Eliso; Bar-Yosef, Ofer; Belfer-Cohen, Anna; et al. (2009). "30,000-Year-Old Wild Flax Fibers" (PDF). Science. 325 (5946): 1359. Bibcode:2009Sci...325.1359K. doi:10.1126/science.1175404. ISSN 0036-8075. PMID 19745144. S2CID 206520793.
- Belfer-Cohen, Anna; Bar-Yosef, Ofer (2002). "Early Sedentism in the Near East". In Kuijt, Ian (ed.). Life in Neolithic Farming Communities: Social Organization, Identity, and Differentiation. Fundamental Issues in Archaeology. Springer. pp. 19–38. doi:10.1007/0-306-47166-3_2. ISBN 9780306471667.
- Bar-Yosef, O.; Vandermeersch, B.; Arensburg, B.; Belfer-Cohen, A.; et al. (1992). "The Excavations in Kebara Cave, Mt. Carmel". Current Anthropology. 33 (5): 497–550. doi:10.1086/204112. ISSN 0011-3204. S2CID 51745296.

== See also ==
- Ofer Bar-Yosef
- Nigel Goring-Morris
