= Kfar HaHoresh (archaeological site) =

Neolithic archaeological site in Israel

Kfar HaHoresh is a Neolithic archaeological site near the kibbutz of the same name in the Jezreel Valley, Israel. Excavations by Nigel Goring-Morris of the Hebrew University of Jerusalem were started in the early 1990s. According to Goring-Morris, the site is a "regional funerary and cult centre" dating to the Pre-Pottery Neolithic B period.
