= Nigel Goring-Morris =

British-Israeli archaeologist

Adrian Nigel Goring-Morris is a British-born archaeologist and a professor at the Hebrew University of Jerusalem.

== Biography ==
Adrian Nigel Goring-Morris completed his PhD at the Hebrew University in 1986. He is known for his discoveries at Kfar HaHoresh, one of the oldest ritual burial sites in the world. The site is located in northern Israel, not far from Nazareth, dating back to 8000 BC (Pre-Pottery Neolithic B).

== Fieldwork ==
- 1991–Present Excavations at Kfar HaHoresh
- 2010 Excavations at Nahal Hava
- 2005 Excavations at Nahal Lavan
- 1995 Excavations at Nahal Besor
- 1991 Excavations at Nahal Negarot

== Major publications ==
- Publication and studies of excavations in the Negev.
- Publication of the excavations at Gilgal I by Tamar Noy (with Ofer Bar-Yosef & Avi Gopher).
- "Religion as the Basis for Power and Property in the First Civilizations" 2009-2011, invited to participate in the Templeton project at Neolithic Çatalhöyük, Turkey, directed by Ian Hodder.

== Selected bibliography ==
Books

- Goring-Morris, A. Nigel, At the Edge: Terminal Pleistocene Hunter-Gatherers in the Negev and Sinai. BAR International Series 361, Oxford, 1987.
- Goring-Morris, A. Nigel. & A. Belfer-Cohen, More Than Meets the Eye: Studies on Upper Palaeolithic Diversity in the Near East. Oxbow Press, Oxford, 2003.
- Bar-Yosef, Ofer, Goring-Morris, A. Nigel & Gopher, Avi. Gilgal: Excavations at Early Neolithic Sites in the Lower Jordan Valley. The Excavations of Tamar Noy. ASPR & David Brown/Oxbow, Oakville, CT., 2010.

Papers

- Goring-Morris, A. N., Upper Palaeolithic Sites from Wadi Fazael, Lower Jordan Valley, Paléorient 6: 173-191, 1980.
- Goring-Morris, A. N. & A. Gopher Nahal Issaron: A Neolithic Settlement from the Southern Negev, Israel. A Preliminary Report of the 1980 Excavations, Israel Exploration Journal 33: 149-162., 1983.
- Belfer-Cohen, A., & A. N. Goring Morris, Har Horesha I: An Upper Palaeolithic Site in the Central Negev Highlands, Mitekufat Haeven 19: 43*-57*, 1986.
- Goring-Morris, A. N., The Harifian of the Southern Levant. In O. Bar-Yosef & F. R. Valla (eds.), The Natufian Culture in the Levant, International Monographs in Prehistory, Ann Arbor, pp. 173–216, 1991.
- A. Belfer-Cohen, I. Gilead, A. N. Goring-Morris, & S. A. Rosen., An Epipalaeolithic Rockshelter at Nahal Neqarot in the Central Negev. Mitekufat Haeven - Journal of the Israel Prehistoric Society 24: 164-168, 1992.
- Goring-Morris, A. N., From Foraging to Herding in the Negev and Sinai: the Early to Late Neolithic Transition. Paléorient 19/1: 63-87, 1993.
- Goring-Morris, A. N., Aspects of the PPNB Lithic Assemblage from Kfar HaHoresh, near Nazareth, Israel. In H.-G. Gebel & S. K. Kozlowski (eds.), Neolithic Chipped Lithic Industries of the Fertile Crescent. SENEPSE 1: 427-444. Berlin: ex oriente, 1994.
- Gopher, A., A. N. Goring-Morris & D. Gordon., Nahal Issaron - The Lithics of the Later PPNB Occupation. In H.-G. Gebel & S. K. Kozlowski (eds.), Neolithic Chipped Lithic Industries of the Fertile Crescent. SENEPSE 1: 479-494. Berlin: ex oriente, 1994.
- Carmi, I., D. Segal, A. N. Goring-Morris & A. Gopher., Dating of the Prehistoric Site of Nahal Issaron in the Southern Negev, Israel, by 14C. Radiocarbon 36/3: 391-398, 1995.
- Goring-Morris, A. N., Complex Hunter-Gatherers at the End of the Paleolithic. 20,000-10,000 BP. In T. E. Levy (ed.), The Archaeology of Society in the Holy Land. pp. 141–168. Leicester University Press. London. 1995.
- Gopher, A., A. N. Goring-Morris & S.A. Rosen., Ein Qadis I: A Pre-Pottery Neolithic B Occupation in Eastern Sinai. 'Atiqot 27: 15-33, 1995.
- Goring-Morris, A. N., The Early Natufian Occupation at El Wad, Mt. Carmel, Reconsidered. In M. Otte (ed.), Nature et Culture. ERAUL 68: 417-427, 1996.
- Goring-Morris, A. N., A Late Natufian Campsite at Givat Hayil I, Western Negev Dunes, Israel. Mitekufat Haeven - Journal of the Israel Prehistoric Society 27: 43-61. 1997.
- Baruch, U., & A. N. Goring-Morris., The Arboreal Vegetation of the Central Negev Highlands, Israel, at the End of the Pleistocene: Evidence from Archaeological Charred Wood Remains. Vegetation History and Archaeobotany 6/4: 249-259, 1997.
- Goring-Morris, A. N.& A. Belfer-Cohen., The Articulation of Cultural Processes and Late Quaternary Environmental Changes in Cisjordan. Paléorient 23/2: 71-93, 1997.
- Gopher, A., & A. N. Goring-Morris., Abu Salem: A Pre-Pottery Neolithic B Camp in the Central Negev Highlands. Bulletin of the American Schools of Oriental Research 312: 1-20, 1998.
- Goring-Morris, A. N., P. Goldberg, Y. Goren, U. Baruch & D. Bar-Yosef., Saflulim: A Late Natufian Base Camp in the Central Negev Highlands, Israel. Palestine Exploration Quarterly 131/1: 36-64, 1999.
- Horwitz, L.K., & A. N. Goring-Morris 2001. Fauna from the Early Natufian Site of Upper Besor 6 in the Central Negev, Israel. Paléorient 26/1: 111-128.
- Kuijt, I., & A. N. Goring-Morris., Foraging, Farming and Social Complexity in the Pre-Pottery Neolithic of the South-Central Levant: A Review and Synthesis. Journal of World Prehistory 16/4:361-440, 2002.
- Goring-Morris, A. N. & A. Belfer-Cohen., Symbolic Behaviour from the Epipalaeolithic and Early Neolithic of the Near East: Preliminary Observations on Continuity and Change. In H.-G. Gebel, B. D. Hermansen & C. Hoffmann (eds.), Magic Practices and Ritual in the Near Eastern Neolithic. SENEPSE 8: 67-79. Berlin: ex oriente. 2002.
- Davidzon, A., & A. N. Goring-Morris., Sealed in Stone: An Example of Early Ahmarian Technology and Mobility in the Light of Refitting Studies at Nahal Nizzana XIII, Israel. Mitekufat Haeven - Journal of the Israel Prehistoric Society 33:75-205, 2003.
- Belfer-Cohen, A., A. Davidzon, A. N. Goring-Morris, D. Lieberman & M. Spiers., Nahal Ein Gev I: A Late Upper Palaeolithic Site by the Sea of Galilee, Israel. Paléorient 30/1: 25-46, 2004.
- Goren, Y. & A. N. Goring-Morris., Early Pyrotechnology in the Near East: Experimental Lime Plaster Production at the PPNB Site of Kfar HaHoresh, Israel. Geoarchaeology 23/6:779-798, 2008.
- Goring-Morris, A. N., Two Kebaran Occupations near Nahal Soreq, and the Reconstruction of Group Ranges in the Early Epipalaeolithic of the Israeli Littoral. Eurasian Prehistory 6/1-2:75-93., 2009.
- Goring-Morris, A. N., O. Marder & D. Amit., Prehistoric Occupations in Me'arat Ha'Sela (Upper Nahal Hever). Mitekufat Haeven - Journal of the IMitekufat Haeven - Journal of the Israel Prehistoric Society 39:1-16, 2009.
- Goring-Morris, A. N. & A. Belfer-Cohen., 'Great Expectations', or, the Inevitable Collapse of the Early Neolithic in the Near East. In M. S. Bandy & J. R. Fox (eds.), Becoming Villagers. Comparing Early Village Societies. pp. 62–77. Amerind Studies in Archaeology, University of Arizona Press, Tucson, 2010.
- Belfer-Cohen, A., and A. N. Goring-Morris., The initial Neolithic in the Near East: Why it is so difficult to deal with the PPNA... Mitekufat Haeven - Journal of the Israel Prehistoric Society 40:1-18, 2010.

Goring-Morris has also contributed to several encyclopedia entries.

== See also ==
- Ofer Bar-Yosef
- Anna Belfer-Cohen
