= Nahal Issaron =

- נחל עשרון (Hebrew)
- Location of Nahal Issaron in Israel
- 29°54′51″N 34°58′21″E
- Location: Israel

Site notes
- Elevation: 453 m (1,486 ft)

Nahal Issaron (Hebrew: נחל עשרון, romanized: Naẖal Issaron) is a wadi and neolithic settlement in southern Negev, Israel. It is located at the eastern edge of Ovda Valley, 5 kilometres (3.1 mi) west of Arabah Rift valley and 35 kilometres (22 mi) north of the Gulf of Aqaba. Excavations carried out by Avi Gopher and Nigel Goring-Morris in Nahal Issaron in 1980 uncovered remnants of an early pastoralist settlement belonging to the Pre-Pottery Neolithic B period.

Naẖal ‘Issaron

Climate chart (precipitation, max. and min. temperature)
J	F	M	A	M	J	J	A	S	O	N	D
7 22 10	8 25 11	9 32 14	1 37 16	3 41 21	1 46 26	1 46 29	1 45 29	1 41 26	2 36 21	5 29 14	4 24 9
- █ Average max. and min. temperatures in °C
- █ Precipitation totals in mm
Imperial conversion
J	F	M	A	M	J	J	A	S	O	N	D
0.3 72 50	0.3 77 52	0.4 90 57	0 99 61	0.1 106 70	0 115 79	0 115 84	0 113 84	0 106 79	0.1 97 70	0.2 84 57	0.2 75 48
- █ Average max. and min. temperatures in °F
- █ Precipitation totals in inches
