= Mujahia =

Archaeological site in the Golan Heights

- Location within the Golan Heights
- 32.8165°N 35.69625°E
- Type: Tell
- Periods: PPNA, PPNB
- Location: southern Golan Heights
- Part of: Settlement

Site notes
- Material: Limestone, Basalt
- Excavation dates: 1985
- Archaeologists: Avi Gopher
- Condition: Ruins
- Public access: Yes

Mujahia or Nab‘a el-Mjảḥiyye is an archaeological site in the southern Golan Heights, north of Bnei Yehuda.

It was first excavated by Avi Gopher in 1985 who examined stratigraphy made up of limestone and basalt. Upon further excavation, three levels of circular walled dwellings were found using stone basalt construction. Archaeological materials recovered included arrowheads, chisels, knives and scrapers along with use of obsidian, bones an shellfish. Relatively few arrowheads were found, mostly consisting of Helwan points. Local fauna included goat and gazelle. No radiometric dating was available, but it has been suggested to date to the Pre-Pottery Neolithic B (PPNB) around the middle of the 8th millennium BC.
