= Netiv HaGdud =

Moshav and Israeli settlement in the West Bank

Netiv HaGdud: נְתִיב הַגְּדוּד (Hebrew)
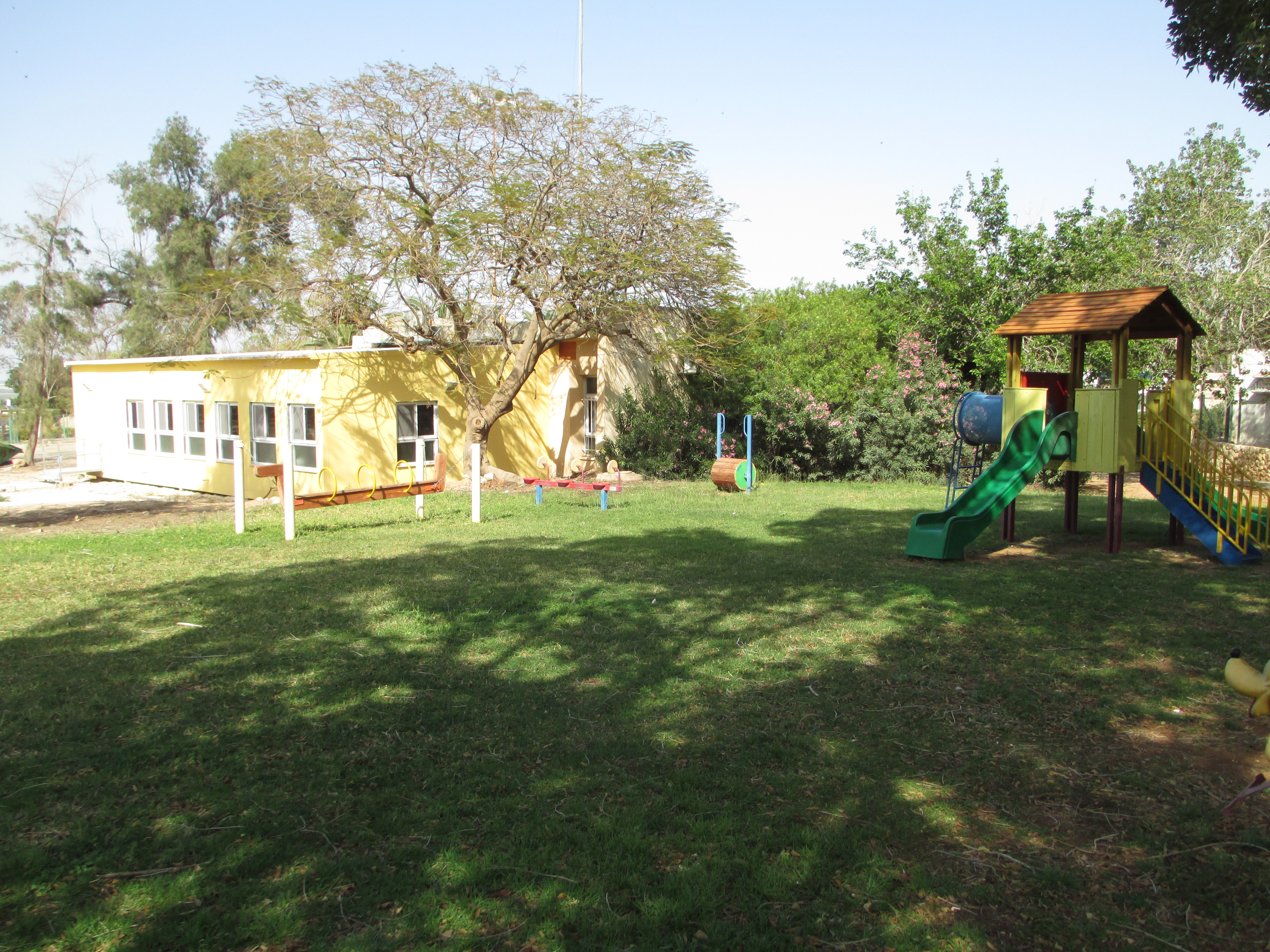

- Location within the Central West Bank Location within the West Bank Location within State of Palestine
- Coordinates: 31°59′18″N 35°26′41″E
- Country: Palestine
- District: Judea and Samaria Area
- Council: Bik'at HaYarden
- Region: West Bank
- Affiliation: Moshavim Movement
- Founded: April 1975
- Population (2024): 222

Netiv HaGdud (Hebrew: נְתִיב הַגְּדוּד, lit. 'Path of the Battalion') is an Israeli settlement organized as a moshav in the West Bank. Located in the Jordan Valley around twenty kilometres north of Jericho, it falls under the jurisdiction of Bik'at HaYarden Regional Council. In 2024 it had a population of 222.

The international community considers Israeli settlements in the West Bank illegal under international law, but the Israeli government disputes this.

== History ==
According to ARIJ, in order to construct Netiv HaGdud, Israel confiscated land from two nearby Palestinian villages: 215 dunams (215000 m^{2}) from Fasayil, and 993 dunams (993,000 m^{2}) from Al-Auja.

The settlement was established in April 1975 by members who had been preparing in Ma'ale Efraim, and was named after the 38th Battalion of the Jewish legion, which fought in the Jordan Valley during World War I. In May 1977 it moved to its present site.

A nearby archaeological site, which has been excavated by Ofer Bar-Yosef amongst others, has produced remains from the Neolithic era, including Pre-Pottery Neolithic A.
