= Kfar HaHoresh =

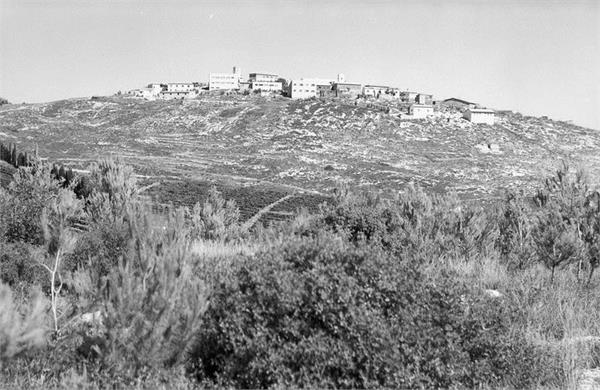
- Etymology: Village of the Thicket
- Location within Jezreel Valley region of Israel Location within Israel
- Coordinates: 32°42′8″N 35°16′27″E
- Country: Israel
- District: Northern
- Subdistrict: Jezreel
- Council: Jezreel Valley
- Affiliation: Kibbutz Movement
- Founded: 1933
- Founder: Gordonia members
- Population (2024): 723
- Website: www.k-h.org.il

Kfar HaHoresh (Hebrew: כְּפַר הַחֹרֶשׁ, כפר החורש, lit. 'Village of the Thicket') is a kibbutz in northern Israel. Located near Nazareth, it falls under the jurisdiction of Jezreel Valley Regional Council. In 2024 it had a population of 723.

== History ==
The kibbutz was established in 1933 by members of the Gordonia youth movement who had previously been living in Ness Ziona. The land had been bought by the Jewish National Fund in 1930. Today the kibbutz has been privatized. The Arabic-language radio station Radio A-Shams broadcasts from the kibbutz.

The Kfar HaHoresh forest includes the remains of Ma'alul village, a depopulated Palestinian location.

A nearby archaeological site dating to the Pre-Pottery Neolithic B period has been under excavation since the early 1990s.

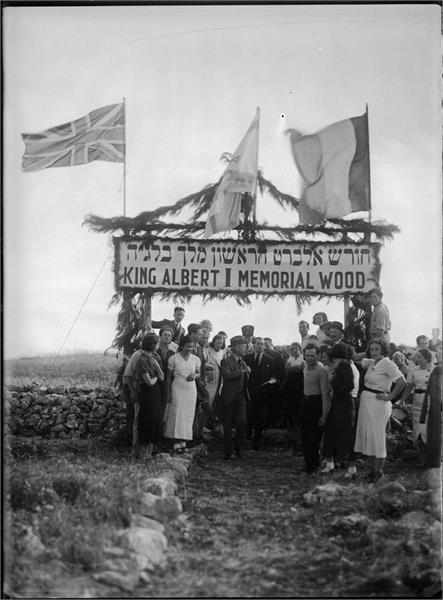
Kfar HaHoresh celebrating tree planting 1936

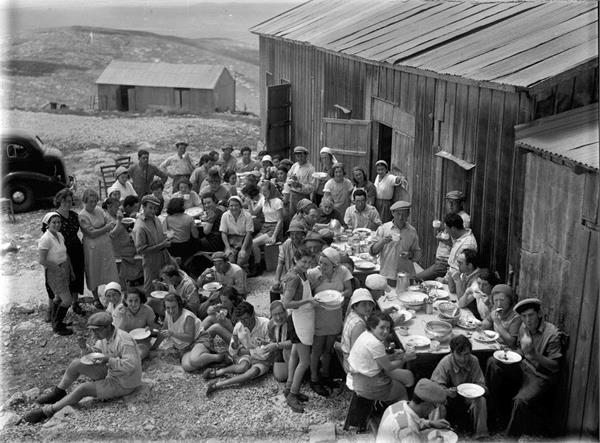
Kfar HaHoresh 1936

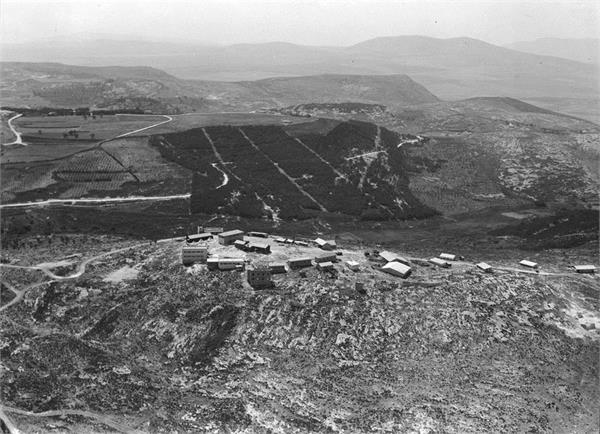
Kfar HaHoresh 1939

== Notable people ==
- Ephraim Kishon
