= Baruch Arensburg =

Israeli anthropologist and archaeologist

- ברוך ארנסבורג
- Born: 1934 (age 91–92); Santiago, Santiago Metropolitan Region, Chile
- Education: Hebrew University of Jerusalem (MA)

Baruch Arensburg (Hebrew: ברוך ארנסבורג; born 1934), professor of Anatomy, Sackler School of Medicine, Tel-Aviv University (emeritus), is a physical anthropologist whose main field of study has been prehistoric and historic populations of the Levant.

He studied at the Sorbonne University, Paris, Physical Anthropology and Comparative Anatomy. At the Hebrew University of Jerusalem he gained his degrees in the fields of Geography and Archaeology (BA) Geography and Zoology (MA). He was the first to study the demographic sequence of populations in the Land of Israel, starting with the Palaeolithic through the Biblical, Classical, Roman, Byzantine periods to the present (PhD topic, Anatomy and Anthropology at Tel Aviv University, 1974). Concurrently he has been conducting on-going research of historic and recent Beduin populations.

He has participated in many archaeological excavations and co-directed (with Ofer Bar-Yosef and Eitan Tchernov), the excavations at Hayonim Cave, mostly studying the Natufian (c. 13,000 calBC) skeletal remains discovered therein. He also was a team member of the Kebara Cave Middle Palaeolithic project and was among those who studied and published the Mousterian (c. 60,000 years old) skeleton recovered on site– his own research concentrating on the speech abilities of that individual, proving that his hyoid bone is identical to that of modern humans.

== Selected bibliography ==
- Arensburg B., M. S. Goldstein, H. Nathan, Y. Rak, 1980 Skeletal remains of Jews from Hellenistic, Roman and Byzantine periods in Israel, I: Metric
- Analysis. Bull. et Mem. de la Soc. D'Anthropologie de Paris 7 (13): 175–186.
- M.S. Goldstein, B. Arensburg, H. Nathan, 1980 Skeletal remains of Jews from the Hellenistic and Roman periods in Israel, II: Non-metric morphological observations. Bull. et Mem. de la Soc. D'Anthrop. de Paris 7 (13): 279–295.
- Arensburg B., A.M. Tillier, 1983 A new Mousterian child from Qafzeh (Israel): Qafzeh 4a. Bull. et Mem. de la Soc. D'Anthrop. de Paris 10 (13): 61–69.
- Arensburg B., P. Smith, 1983 The Jewish population of Jericho 100 B.C. - 70 C.E. Palestine Exploration Quarterly: 133–139.
- Arensburg B., A.M. Tillier, B. Vandermeersch, H. Duday, L.A. Scheparts and Y. Rak, 1989 A Middle Palaeolithic Human Hyoid Bone. Nature 338: 758–760.
- Rado, R., Himelfarb, M., Arensburg, B., Terkel, J. and Wollberg, Z. 1989 Are seismic communication signals transmitted by bone conduction in the blind mole rat? Hearing Research 41: 23 - 30.
- Arensburg, B., Schepartz, L.A., Tillier, A.M., Vandermeersch, B. and Rak, Y., 1990 A Reappraisal of the Anatomical Basis for Speech in Middle Palaeolithic Hominids. Am. J. Physical Anthropology 83: 137–146.
- Shatz A. Hiss J. and Arensburg B. 1991 Basement membrane thickening of the vocal cords in Sudden Infant Death Syndrome. Laryngoscope 101: 484 - 486.
- Belfer-Cohen, A., L. Schepartz, and B. Arensburg. 1991. New Biological Data for the Natufian Populations in Israel, in The Natufian Culture in the Levant. Edited by O. Bar-Yosef and F. R. Valla, pp. 411–424. Ann Arbor: International Monographs in Prehistory.
- Wish-Baratz S., Arensburg B. and Alter Z. 1992 Anatomical Relationships and Superior Reinforcement of the TMJ Mandibular Fossa. Journal of Craniomandibular Disorders, Facial and Oral Pain 6 (3): 171 - 176.
- Hershkovitz I., Edelson G., Spiers M., Arensburg B., Nadel D. and Levi B. 1993 Ohalo II man - Unusual findings in the anterior rib cage and shoulder girdle of a 19.000 years old specimen. International Journal of Osteoarchaeology 3: 177 - 188.
- Vandermeersch B., Arensburg B., Tillier A-M., Rak Y., Weiner S., Spiers M. and Aspillaga E. 1994 Middle Palaeolithic Dental Bacteria from Kebara Israel. Compte Rendus de l'Académie des Sciences, Paris, Série II, 319: 727 - 731.
- Hershkovitz I., Bar-Yosef O. and Arensburg B. 1994 The pre-pottery Neolithic populations of South Sinai and their relation to other circum-Mediterranean groups: An anthropological study. Paléorient 20 (2): 59 - 84.
- Pap I., Tillier AM., Arensburg B., Weiner S. and Chech M. 1995 First scanning electron microscope analysis of dental calculus from European Neanderthals: Subalyuk, (Middle Paleolithic, Hungary). Bull. et Mem. Societe d'Anthropologie de Paris 7: 69–72.
- Arensburg B. 1996 Ancient dental calculus and diet. Human Evolution 11(2): 139 – 145.
- Arensburg B., Pap I., Tillier AM and Chech M. 1996 The Subalyuk 2 middle ear stapes. International Journal of Osteoarchaeology 6: 185 - 188.
- Arensburg B. and Goldstein SM. 1996 A Review of Paleopathology in the Middle East, in Health and disease in the Holy Land. Edited by Waserman M. and Kottek SS., pp. 19 – 36. The Edwin Mellen Press, Lewiston.
- Tillier AM., Kaffe I., Arensburg B. and Chech M. 1998 Hypodontia of permanent teeth among Middle Palaeolithic Hominids: An early case dated to ca. 92.000 +/- 5.000 years BP at Qafzeh Site. International Journal of Osteoarchaeology 8: 1–6.
- Yahel J. and Arensburg B. 1998 The topographic relationships of the unpaired visceral branches of the aorta. Clinical Anatomy 11: 304 – 309.
