= Israel Hershkovitz =

Israeli anthropologist and anatomist

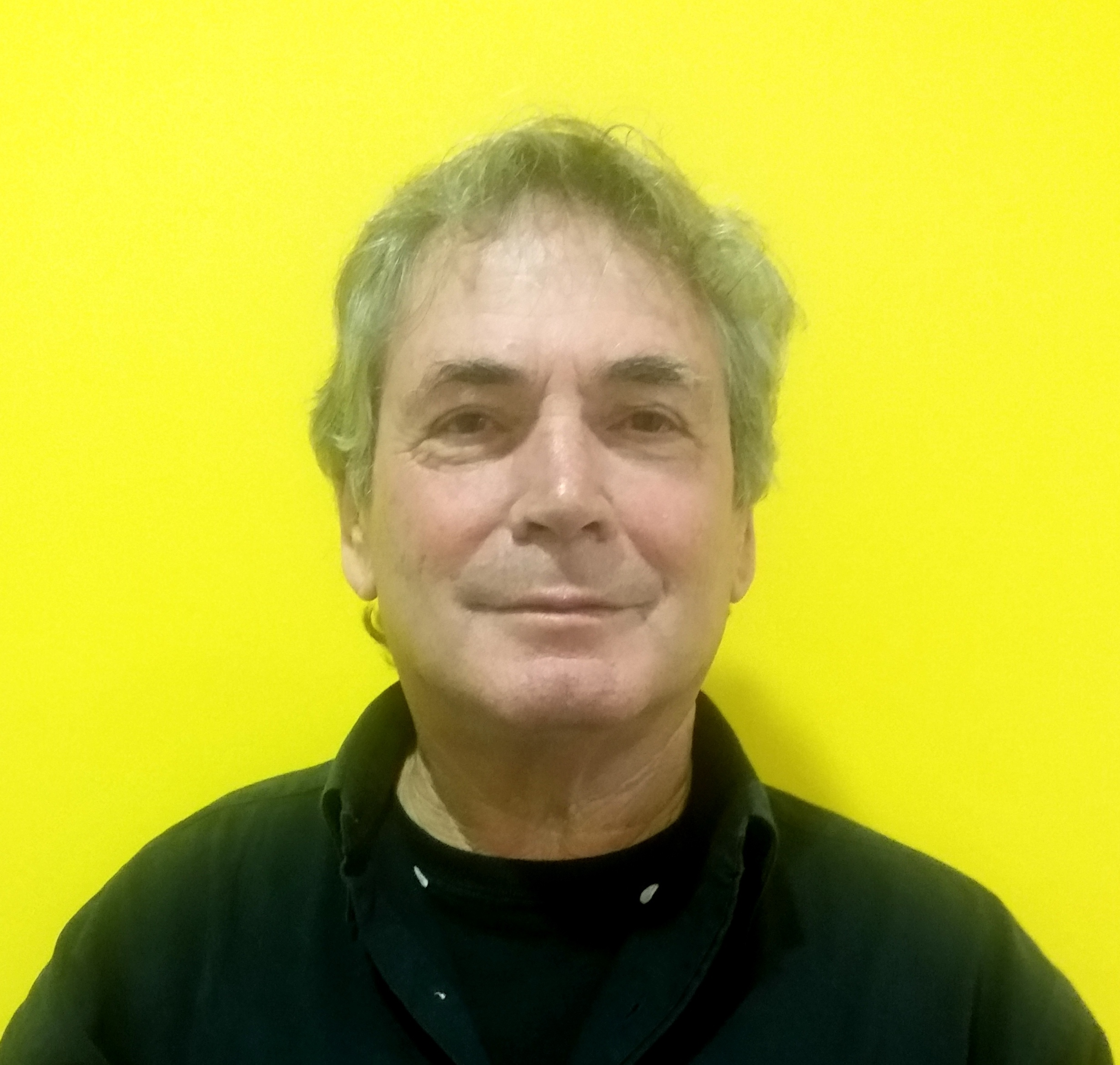
Israel Hershkovitz

Israel Hershkovitz (Hebrew: ישראל הרשקוביץ) is an Israeli anthropologist and anatomist, and a Professor Emeritus at Tel Aviv University's Faculty of Medical and Health Sciences. Hershkovitz is known for his extensive study of skeletal remains from various prehistoric and historic populations in Israel, including significant discoveries from Qesem Cave, Misliya Cave, Skhul Cave, Geula Cave, Tinshemet Cave, Manot Cave and Nesher Ramla open-air site. He founded and led the Dan David Center for Human Evolution and Biohistory Research and the Shmunis Family Anthropology Institute, and he held the Tassia and Dr. Joseph Meyshan Chair of the History and Philosophy of Medicine.

== Early life and education ==
From 1968 to 1972, Hershkovitz served in the Israel Defense Forces, completing his service with the rank of lieutenant colonel. He received a bachelor's degree from the Hebrew University of Jerusalem in 1977, a master's degree from Tel Aviv University in 1981, and a PhD from Tel Aviv University in 1985.

== Biography ==
Hershkovitz was born in Kibbutz Gvar-am in 1950 to Dov and Rachel Hershkovitz, Holocaust survivors. He spent his childhood on a small farm (Moshav Gea). At the age of 14, the family moved to Ashqelon City, where he finished high school (1968). After completing his army service (paratrooper unit, released from military reserved in the rank of Lieutenant Colonel), he began (1972) studying toward his first degree in psychology and anthropology at the Hebrew University. When he graduated, he moved to live in the South Sinai where he first worked for the Society for the Protection of Nature and later for the local archeological officer. In 1979, he moved to Tel Aviv University's School of Medicine, where he earned his MSc (1982) and Ph.D. (1984) in physical anthropology and anatomy. His MSc was dedicated to the Neolithic hunters of the desert (Supervised by Professor Baruch Arensburg) and his Ph.D. on the effect of mating types on the growth and development of Bedouin children (Supervised by Professor Yair Ben-David). In 1984, he began teaching at the School of Medicine. He was appointed associate professor in 1994 and full professor in 1999.

Early in his career from 1978-1982, Hershkovitz participated in two research missions to the South Sinai Desert, one focused on excavating and studying the local prehistoric and protohistoric populations and the second, on the biology of the local living Bedouin populations, with emphasis on the children. His paleoanthropological study focused on early pastoralist communities in the Sinai Desert (Nawamis burial sites). From 1982 to 1992, he directed his scientific efforts toward the Levantine Neolithic populations in order to reveal the impact of the agricultural revolution on the local population's health, demography, and physical appearance. He took an active part in excavating and studying the human skeletal remains of sites such as Kefar Hahoresh, Yiftahel, El-Wad, Horvat Galil, Nahal Betzet and Atlit Yam (a submerged site). He then moved his interest to the field of paleopathology, and established evidence-based methods for identifying a variety of diseases in ancient bones (e.g., tuberculosis, multiple myeloma). He later focused on evolutionary explanations for spinal maladies, before moving into the field of human evolution, with emphasis on Middle and Upper Paleolithic Levantine populations. He excavated and studied human fossils from archeological sites like Qesem Cave, Misliya Cave, Geula Cave, Tinshemet Cave, Manot Cave, Tabun Cave, Skhul Cave, Nesher Ramla open-air site, and Ohalo submerged site, to mention but few. In Between, Hershkovitz was involved in studying skeletal remains from many historic sites, with a focus on the Byzantine period (Han-el-Ahmar, Beit-Guvrine, Tira, Rehovot in the Negev, Hagoshrim, etc.).

== Research interests ==
Hershkovitz's research has encompassed various aspects of human biology, particularly focusing on the evolution and development of Levantine prehistoric, historical, and present populations. His team discovered and studied several significant fossils in Israel that have become milestones in the understanding of human evolution. They published the first modern Homo sapiens fossil from Manot Cave (55,000 years old) and revealed evidence of ritual practices in the early Upper Paleolithic. They also discovered the earliest Homo sapiens fossil outside Africa at Misliya Cave (180,000 years old) and identified a new Homo group at Nesher Ramla (120,000 years old). Additionally, they explored the relationships between Levantine Late Pleistocene Homo and their European counterparts and studied the latest Levantine Upper Paleolithic fossil from Ohalo (22,000 years old). Hershkovitz's early work focused on the impact of the agricultural revolution on the health, demography, and social structure of Levantine populations, and he contributed to the understanding of micro-evolutionary changes throughout the Holocene. He participated in the excavation and study of early maritime populations in the eastern Mediterranean, including the submerged Atlit-Yam site. As a paleopathologist, Hershkovitz established criteria for disease identification in ancient bones and examined the connection between maladies and our evolutionary history. He studied the association between bone fracture patterns and the physical characteristics of the impact, the architecture of the spine and its association to bipedality, and the association between modern diseases and humans'biological history.
