= Ofer Bar-Yosef =

Israeli archaeologist and anthropologist (1937–2020)

- עופר בר-יוסף
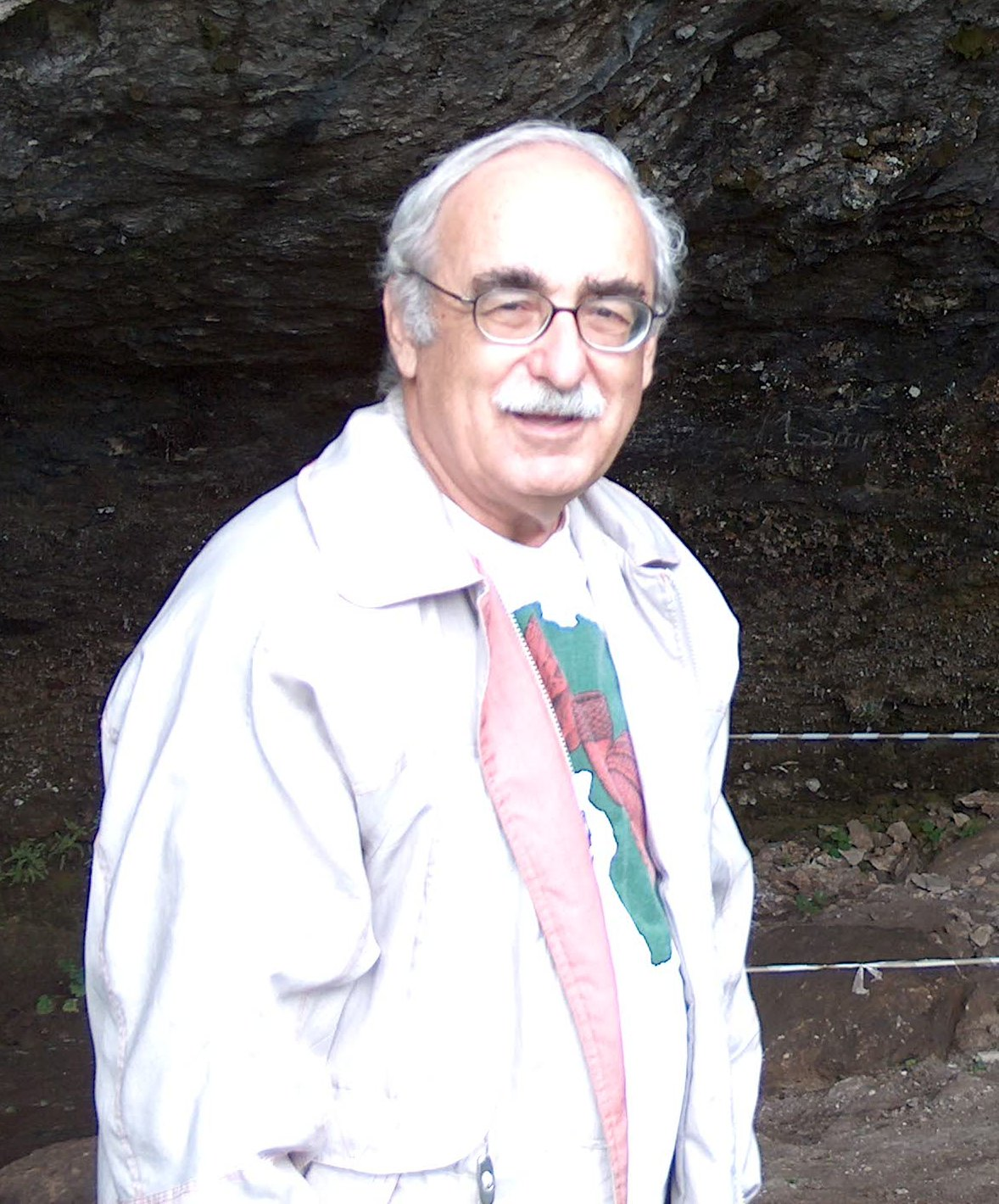
- Ofer Bar-Yosef in 2006
- Born: 1937; Jerusalem, Mandatory Palestine
- Died: March 14, 2020 (aged 82–83)
- Education: Harvard University, HUJI, Peabody Museum of Archaeology and Ethnology (Palaeolithic Archaeology Curator)
- Known for: Palaeolithic and Neolithic Chinese/Georgian studies, excavations of the Levantine Kebara Cave and early Neolithic village of Netiv HaGdud
- Scientific career
- Fields: Archaeology
- Workplaces: Hebrew University of Jerusalem

Ofer Bar-Yosef (Hebrew: עופר בר-יוסף; 29 August 1937 – 14 March 2020) was an Israeli archaeologist and anthropologist whose main field of study was the Palaeolithic period.

== Archaeology and academic career ==
From 1967, Bar-Yosef was Professor of Prehistoric Archaeology at Hebrew University of Jerusalem, the institution where he studied archaeology at undergraduate and post-graduate levels in the 1960s.

In 1988, upon his immigration to the U.S., where he took up a tenor of Professor of Prehistoric Archaeology at Harvard University as well as Curator of Palaeolithic Archaeology at the Peabody Museum of Archaeology and Ethnology.

He excavated prehistoric Levantine sites such as Kebara Cave and the early Neolithic village of Netiv HaGdud, as well as Palaeolithic and Neolithic sites in China and Georgia.

== Selected publications ==
- The Natufian Culture in the Levant (Ed), International Monographs in Prehistory, 1992.
- Late Quaternary Chronology and Paleoclimates of the Eastern Mediterranean. Radiocarbon, 1994.
- Seasonality and Sedentism: Archaeological Perspectives from Old and New World Sites, (Ed), Peabody Museum of Archaeology and Ethnology, 1998.
- (with Belfer-Cohen, A) From Africa to Eurasia - Early Dispersals. Quaternary International 75:19-28, 2001.

== See also ==
- Nigel Goring-Morris
- Anna Belfer-Cohen
