= Kebara Cave =

Cave in Israel

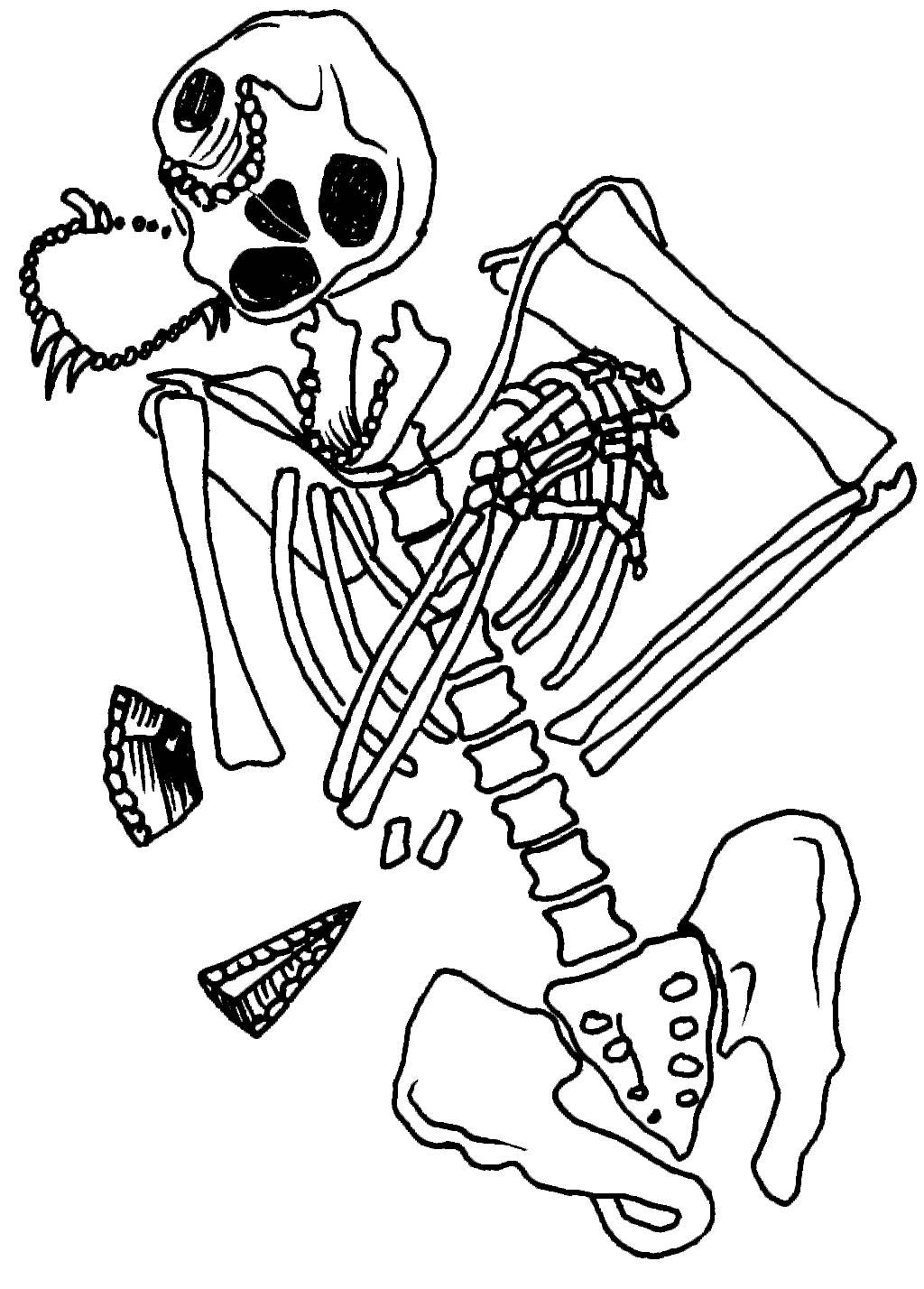
- Kebara 2 in situ

- Location within Haifa region of Israel
- Location: Zikhron Ya'akov, Israel
- Coordinates: 32°33′29.8″N 34°56′14.3″E
- Elevation: 60 to 65 m (197 to 213 ft) above sea level
- Discovery: Early 1930s
- Geology: Limestone

Kebara Cave (Hebrew: מערת כבארה, romanized: Me'arat Kebbara, Arabic: مغارة الكبارة, romanized: Mugharat al-Kabara) is a limestone cave locality in Wadi Kebara, Israel, situated at 60 to 65 m (197 to 213 ft) above sea level on the western escarpment of the Carmel Range, in the Ramat HaNadiv preserve of Zichron Yaakov.

== History ==
The cave was inhabited between 60,000 and 48,000 BP and is famous for its excavated finds of hominid remains.

Dorothy Garrod and Francis Turville-Petre excavated in the cave in the early 1930s. Excavations have since yielded a large number of human remains associated with a Mousterian archaeological context. The first specimen discovered in 1965, during the excavations of M. Stekelis, was an incomplete infant skeleton (Kebara 1).

The most significant discovery made at Kebara Cave was Kebara 2 in 1982, the most complete postcranial Neanderthal skeleton found to date. Nicknamed "Moshe" and dating to circa 60,000 BP, the skeleton preserved a large part of one individual's torso (vertebral column, ribs and pelvis). The cranium and most of the lower limbs were missing. The hyoid bone was also preserved, and was the first Neanderthal hyoid bone found, which was determined to be very similar in structure to modern humans', thus leading to speculation around the Neanderthal's ability to vocalize.

The Kebaran culture is named after the site.

== See also ==
- Archaeology in Israel
- List of fossil sites (with link directory)
- List of human evolution fossils
- List of transitional fossils
