= Azraq 18 =

Epipalaeolithic archaeological site in Jordan

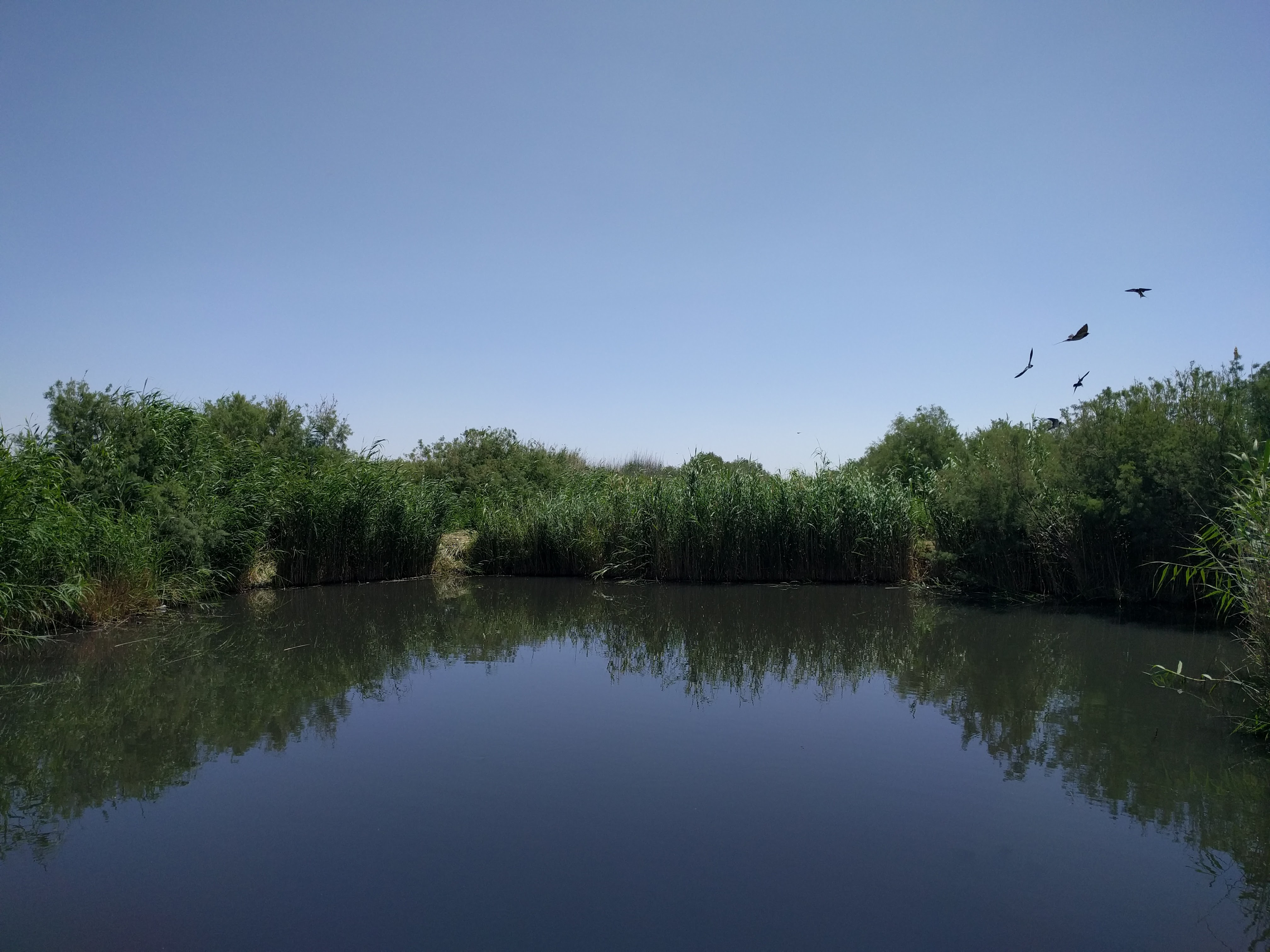
The Azraq Wetland Reserve, close to Azraq 18. Faunal evidence indicates that a similar wetland likely existed around Azraq at the time the site was occupied.

Azraq 18 is an Epipalaeolithic archaeological site in the Azraq oasis, eastern Jordan. First recorded in a survey by Andrew Garrard and Nicholas Stanley-Price in 1975, and excavated by Garrard in 1985, it is one of many sites of prehistoric occupation around the perennial springs that feed the oasis. Of these, Azraq 18 is the only one associated with the Late Epipalaeolithic Natufian culture, which is dated to between around 15,000 to 11,500 years ago.

Although the people of the Natufian culture were nomadic hunter-gatherers, Azraq 18 shows signs of repeated visits and use for long periods of time. The excavations revealed the remains of structures, heavy ground stone tools, finely-worked bone and microlithic stone tools, and a large volume of plant and animal remains. The animal remains included wild cattle and duck, indicating that the site was probably in or near to a wetland area. Notably, a collective burial of three adults and four children was discovered at the site; one of very few surviving Natufian burials from the arid regions of the Levant. The bodies were interred separately at different times, and some of the skulls were later removed, treated with coloured pigments, and reburied. The practice of retrieving and manipulating human remains—especially skulls—after burial began in with the Natufian and spread across Southwest Asia in the subsequent Neolithic period, and is sometimes referred as the Neolithic skull cult.

After the 1985 excavations the area was cleared for agricultural use, likely destroying anything that remained.

== See also ==
- ʿAin Mallaha
- Shubayqa 1
