= Ohalo II =

Early Epipalaeolithic archaeological site in Israel

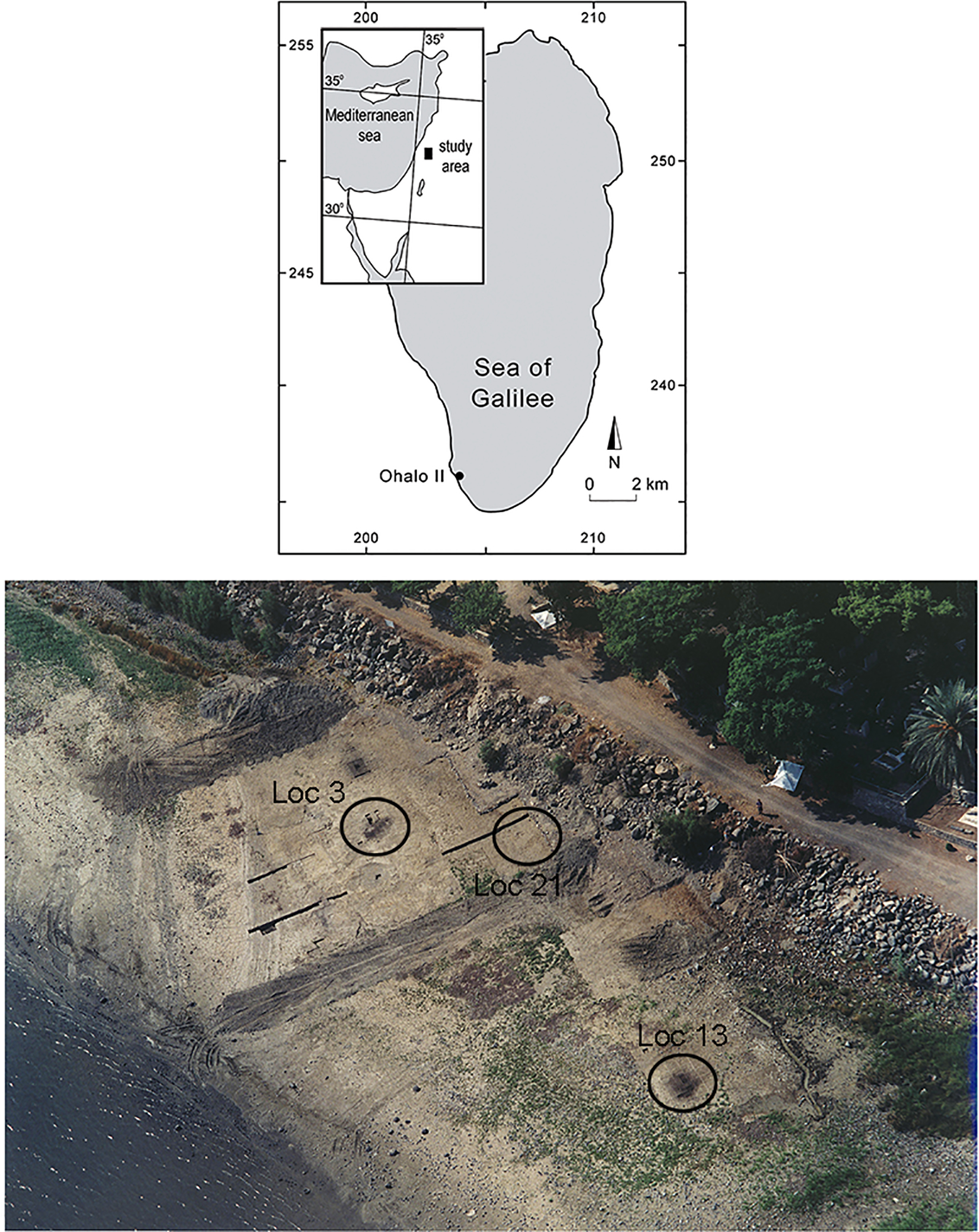
- Interactive map of Ohalo II
- 32.722093°N 35.572143°E
- Type: Archaeological site
- Location: Northern District, Israel

History
- Built: c. 23,000 years ago

Site notes
- Excavation dates: 1989-1991, 1999-2000
- Discovered: 1989

Ohalo II is an archaeological site in the Northern District, Israel, near Kinneret, on the southwest shore of the Sea of Galilee. It is one of the best preserved hunter-gatherer archaeological sites of the Last Glacial Maximum, radiocarbon dated to around 23,000 BP (calibrated). It is at the junction of the Upper Paleolithic and the Epipaleolithic, and has been attributed to both periods. The site is significant for two findings which are the world's oldest: the earliest brushwood dwellings and evidence for the earliest small-scale plant cultivation, some 11,000 years before the onset of agriculture. The numerous fruit and cereal grain remains preserved in anaerobic conditions under silt and water are also exceedingly rare due to their general quick decomposition.

== History ==
Ohalo II is the name given to the archaeological site located on the southwest shore of the Sea of Galilee in the Levant Jordan Rift Valley. The site consists of the remains of six charcoal rings where brushwood dwellings had been during the Upper Paleolithic. The huts are oval in shape and average between 9 and 16 feet (2.7 and 4.9 m) long. They were simple in design, were constructed of tree branches and brushwood, and "probably only took a few hours to make." Hearths were located outside the huts.

In addition to the huts, the site also contains a grave and an area that was probably used as a refuse dump. The site is littered with a treasure trove of artifacts, including flints, animal bones, and remnants of fruit and cereal grains. Hundreds of species of birds, fish, fruits, vegetables, cereal grains, and large animals have been identified at the site. These finds have greatly expanded knowledge of Upper Paleolithic hunting and gathering practices.

At the time hunter-gatherers settled down at Ohalo II, the Sea of Galilee was newly formed and may have been attractive to many bands of people. After Ohalo II had been occupied for a relatively short amount of time, probably only a few generations, the village burned to the ground. Whether the burning was intentional or accidental is unknown. But what may have been tragic for its ancient inhabitants turned out to be a boon for archaeologists: at the same time as the village was destroyed, water levels at the Sea of Galilee rose and buried the site. Fortunately,

...calm, relatively deep water covered the site, and the immediate deposition of fine clay and silt layers began. Together, the water sediments sealed the site and protected the remains in situ for millennia. Since then, the rate of decomposition has been extremely low in the submerged anaerobic conditions and the preservation of organic material has been excellent.

This submersion and sedimentation (likely in combination with the charring) slowed the growth of bacteria in organic plant remains, preventing their destruction and preserving them through millennia on the lake bottom. It is possible that the rise in sea level that made preservation possible at Ohalo II was either caused by increase in global temperature at the end of the last glacial period or by an earthquake that changed the course of the water flowing into the Sea of Galilee. The site was discovered in 1989, when an extended drought caused a 9-metre (30 ft) drop in water levels in the Sea of Galilee.

== Excavations ==
Dani Nadel of University of Haifa excavated Ohalo II in 1989 during the first drought-induced drop in water levels at the Sea of Galilee. However, when the drought abated and waters of the Sea of Galilee rose, the site became inaccessible, and work at Ohalo was halted for 10 years, until the water receded again in 1999. The Israeli Antiquities Authority organized the excavations on Ohalo II, which continued when sea levels permitted. The two main excavations at Ohalo II occurred from 1989 to 1991 and from 1999 to 2000.

The site spanned 2 km^{2} (494 acres), and revealed unusually well-preserved material. In addition to rare organic matter found, archaeologists also discovered the remains of several small dwellings, hearths outside the dwellings, a human burial, and stone tools. The excavation of Ohalo II revealed three surprises: organic material that had been well preserved for thousands of years, clues concerning how people thrived during one of the coldest time periods in history, and some of the earliest evidence for bedding in human history. It is possible that the site is larger than the area that has been excavated, but unless sea levels continue to drop, archaeologists will not be able to investigate the full range of the site.

Other discoveries at these sites found similar architectural methods in housing structures from Ohalo II, that were being used at Ein Gev I, and still present during the Natufian culture and Pre-Pottery Neolithic A.

== Organic remains ==
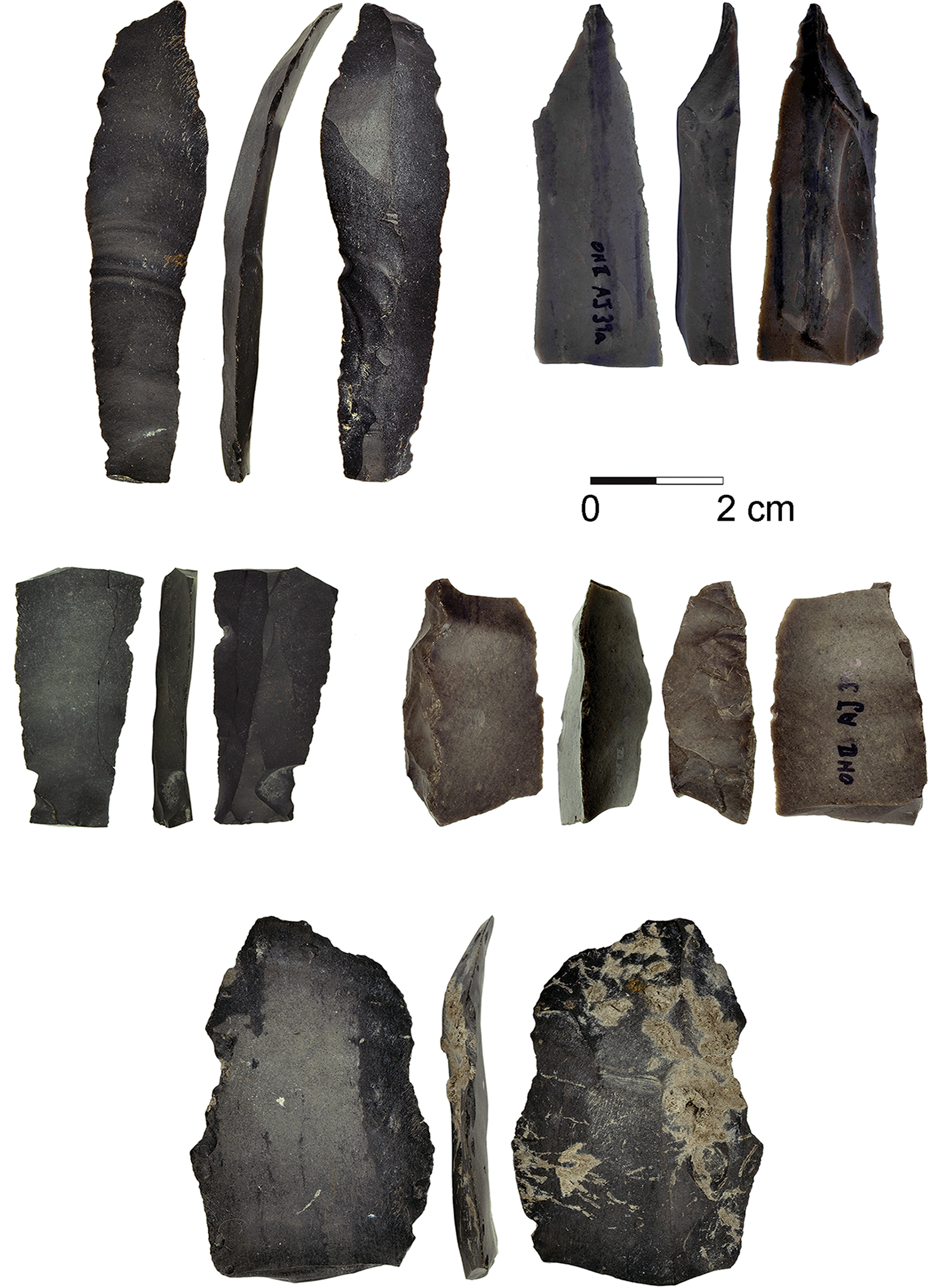
Composite Sickles for Cereal Harvesting at 23,000-Years-Old Ohalo II

Archeologists have conducted an exhaustive study of Hut 1 at Ohalo II; this hut yielded over 90,000 seeds. The seeds account for more than 100 species of wild barley and fruits. Such a high concentration of seeds in the hut makes it highly unlikely that they were accidentally deposited into the hut via natural forces such as wind. In addition, statistical analysis demonstrates that the concentration of plant matter was significantly higher around the walls than the center. Had the seeds been deposited by the collapsed roof, they would have evenly scattered on the ground. Furthermore, just 13 species of fruit and cereal make up about half of the total number of seeds found in the area; these include brome grains (Bromus pseudobrachystachys), wild barley (Hordeum spontaneum) and millet grass grains (Piptatherum holciforme), just to name a few. This suggests a marked preference of certain species of edible plants. Archaeobotanical analysis identified 16,168 grains from five groups of small-grained wild grasses, of which brome (Bromus pseudobrachystachys/tigridis) accounted for 10,995 specimens. Weiss and colleagues argued that their abundance and fully mature condition were consistent with deliberate collection for food rather than incidental incorporation into the site; they also suggested that some of these grasses may have provided grain earlier in the season than the principal wild cereals. A seed of particular interest comes from the Rubus fruit, which was fragile, difficult to transport, and preferably eaten immediately after collection. The presence of Rubus seeds at the Ohalo II site could indicate that the seeds were dried in the sun or by the fire for storage: early evidence for advanced planning of plant food consumption. Most importantly, the extremely high concentration of seeds clustering around the grinding stone in the northern wall of Hut 1 led archeologist Ehud Weiss to believe that humans at Ohalo II processed the grain before consumption.

A 2015 study reported that its "findings represent the earliest indications for the presence of proto-weeds in a site predating the Neolithic plant domestication by some 11,000 years. This study shows for the first time that proto-weeds grew in the vicinity of human camps and most probably also in small-scale, cultivated plots.

The exact spatial distribution of the seed around a grinding stone further indicates extensive preparation. The seeds were scattered in a U-shape around the grinding stone, Weiss hypothesized that a woman was squatting at the open end of the U, and actively distributing the seeds all around her while grinding.

== Non-organic findings at Ohalo II ==
=== Grinding stone in Hut 1 ===
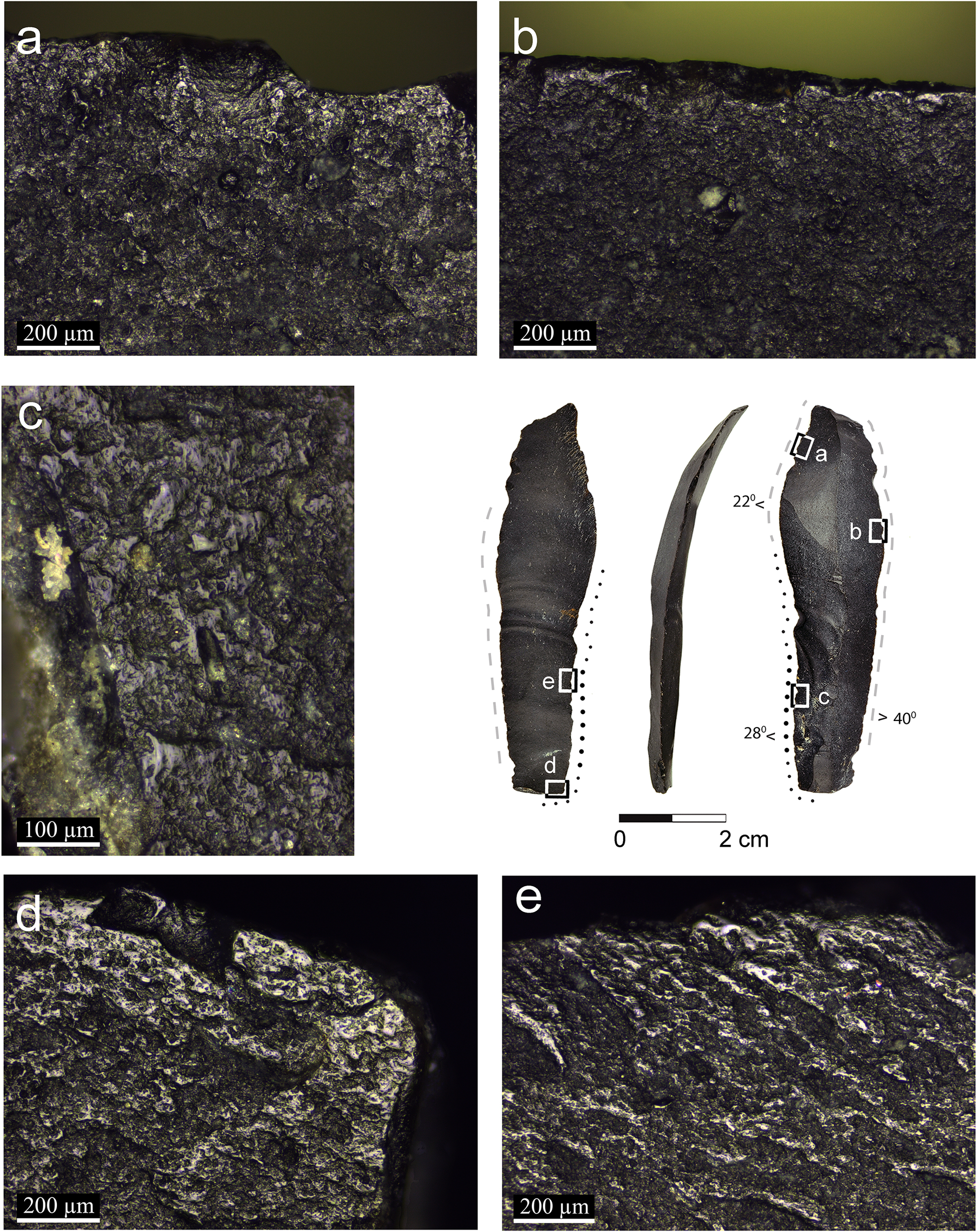
Composite Sickles for Cereal Harvesting at 23,000-Years-Old Ohalo II. Artifact with micrographs of the semi-ripe cereal use and prehension wear.

There is significant evidence to suggest that the center of activity for the inhabitants of Hut 1 was along the northern wall where the 40 cm (16 in) long trapezoidal stone laid. There is strong evidence to suggest that this stone was used for the grinding of grain. It appears that someone attempted to embed the stone deep into the ground, using sand to provide a base beneath the grinding stone and small cobbles to provide additional support. A starch grain study was conducted and grain remains were found on the grinding stone surface. A follow-up study was able to give further evidence to this use, documenting the processing of wild barley, wild wheat and wild oats on the stone.

=== Flint tools ===
The flint tools in Ohalo II are highly varied, representing all stages of core reduction and are distributed in a pattern. Bladelets form a large percentage of the debris in hut I, which also include blades, flakes, primary elements, core trimming elements, and cores. There are 132 retouched tools, which are modified versions of stone flakes. A fairly large concentration of minute bladelets and flakes, along with other angular and fire-cracked fragments were found in the southern area, particularly around the entrance of Hut 1. There were also heavy cores and primary elements found in that vicinity. It is probable that individuals conducted flint-knapping near the entrance by the light from the door.

=== Sickles for harvesting cereals ===
Use-wear analysis of five glossed flint blades found at Ohalo II provides the earliest evidence for the use of composite cereal harvesting tools. The wear traces indicate that tools were used for harvesting near-ripe semi-green wild cereals, shortly before grains are ripe and disperse naturally. The studied tools were not used intensively, and they reflect two harvesting modes: flint knives held by hand and inserts hafted in a handle. The finds shed new light on cereal harvesting techniques some 8,000 years before the Natufian culture and 12,000 years before the establishment of sedentary farming communities in the Near East. Furthermore, the new finds accord well with evidence for the earliest ever cereal cultivation at the site and the use of stone-made grinding implements.

== Spatial distribution and gender roles ==
A study analysing the distribution of flint materials and plant materials showed that distinct parts of the huts were used for different purposes. The concentration of flint material in the entrance area contrasts with plant material concentration and grinding stone placement in other parts of the hut, suggesting a distinct separation in activity space for food-preparation and tool-making. It is likely that this was a deliberate division of space within the hut. However it is also possible that these two activities were not absolutely restricted to their respective areas.

One possible interpretation of this observed divide is labor division based on sex. Such a division has been observed in many past societies, however the culture-specific variability of this is also very high. As such, if this observed labor division was indeed related to gender, the finds at Ohalo II reflect the oldest evidence for such a situation.

== See also ==
- Archaeology of Israel
- Kharaneh IV
