= Iraq ed-Dubb =

Neolithical archaeological site in Jordan

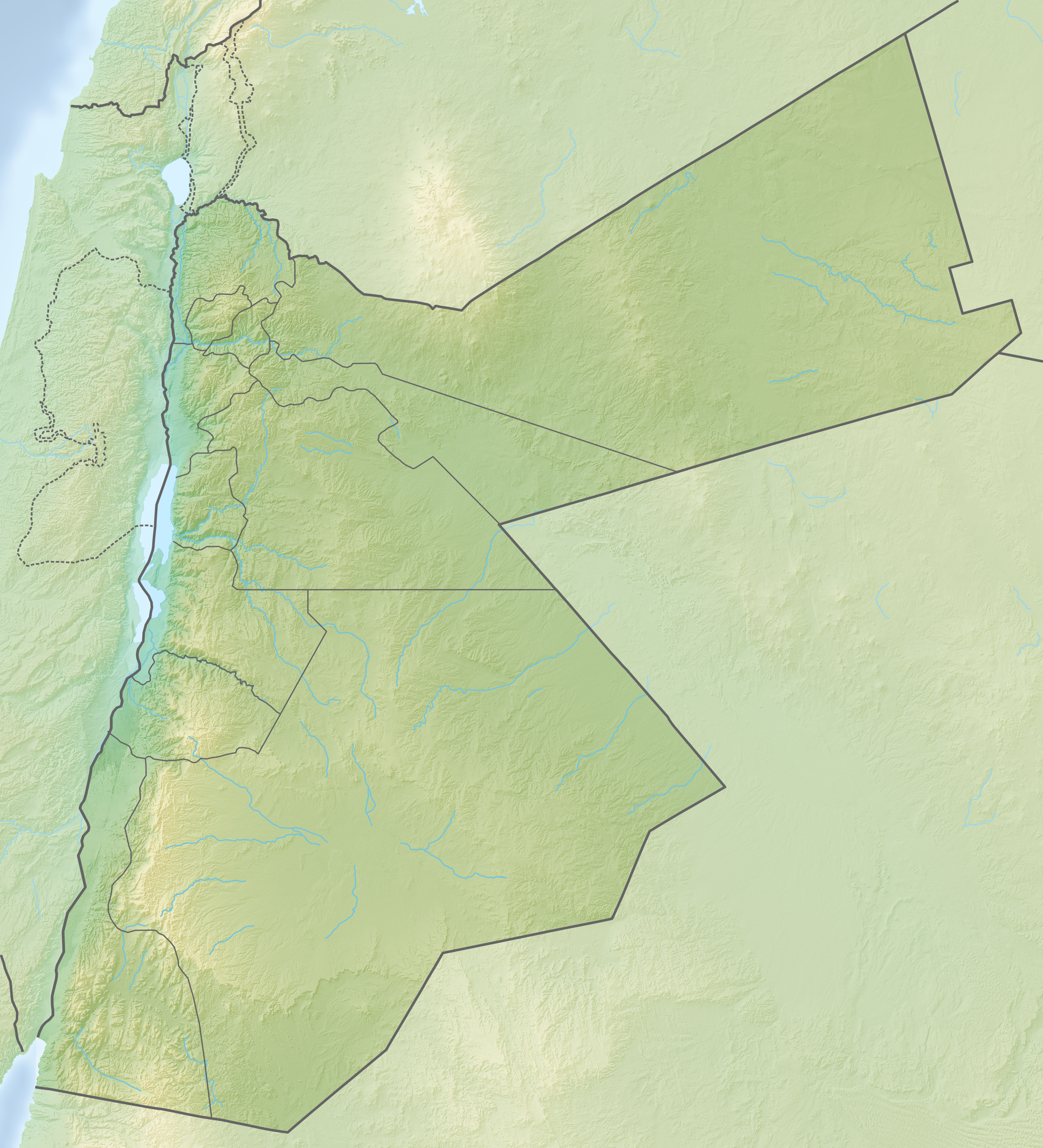
- location in Jordan
- 32.36°N 35.73°E
- Type: stone structure within a rock shelter
- Periods: PPNA/PPNB
- Cultures: Natufian, Neolithic
- Region: Jordan

Site notes
- Area: 150 square metres (0.015 ha) inside cave, 300 square metres (0.030 ha) terrace outside cave
- Archaeologists: Ian Kuijt
- Condition: Ruins

Iraq ed-Dubb, or the Cave of the Bear, is an early Neolithic archeological site 7 km (4.3 mi) northwest of Ajlun in the Jordan Valley, in modern-day Jordan. The settlement existed before 8,000 BCE and experimented with the cultivation of founder crops, side by side with the harvesting of wild cereals. Along with Tell Aswad in Syria, the site shows the earliest reference to domestic hulled barley between 10,000 and 8,800 BCE. The site is located on a forested limestone escarpment above the Wadi el-Yabis in northwest Jordan. An oval-shaped stone structure was excavated along with two burials and a variety of animal and plant remains.

The cave is 150 m (490 ft) above the wadi el-Yabis with a total area in the cave of around 150 m (490 ft), with as much as 300 m (980 ft) on the surrounding terrace. The cave measures 10 m (33 ft) by 14 m (46 ft) with an oval structure inside measuring 4.5 m (15 ft). It features mud floors overlaid on mud brick architecture along with a burned post and the two human burials found in bedrock depressions. The site was discovered in June 1989 when a few soundings were made with further excavations over three seasons, led by Ian Kuijt. The cave was covered in goat dung at the time of excavation, indicating it was used as an occasional animal holding pen until modern times. The stone tool assemblage was suggested to be similar to other early neolithic sites in the Jordan valley and included El Khiam points. The site has provided important information regarding the use of upland forested areas in the early neolithic period. Material remains at the site have been radiocarbon dated to around 7,950 BCE.

Two periods of occupation were detected in the Pre-Pottery Neolithic A (PPNA) period with one of them possibly being late Natufian. The later structure had upright stone walls, mud floors and remains from a hearth. The earlier construction was detected to have had mud bricks, several pit features in the bedrock and the burned post. The radiocarbon date of charcoal suggested occupation earlier than the sites of Netiv Hagdud or Jericho providing insight into different means of subsistence in upland areas during this transitional phase prior to the development of farming in the Jordan valley. At the time of excavation, it was the only known stratified cave site dating to the early neolithic period in Jordan.

Sue Colledge has suggested that along with Tell Aswad, the site shows the earliest evidence for domesticated cereal morphology, claiming the site has the "earliest dated evidence for the use of domestic cereals in southwestern Asia" with a date range from approximately 9600 to 9475 BCE. It was noted that the number of specimens reported was low and their preservation was poor. Colledge assumed finds of domesticated barley (Hordeum vulgare) and wheat (likely Triticum turgidum dicoccum) were growing in secondary habitats.

George Wilcox warned that the discovery of two grains of einkorn wheat at the site should be treated cautiously as anomalies to the general assumption that emmer was the only type of wheat used during the PPNA in the southern Levant. Graeme Barker has suggested that the spikelet forks and glume bases of domesticated wheat found were likely emmer.

Studies have also been carried out on the fauna remains over the period of time between the Natufian and PPNA periods when hunter-gatherer groups first experimented with farming.
