= ʿAin Mallaha =

Prehistoric site in northern Israel

'Ain Mallaha (Eynan)
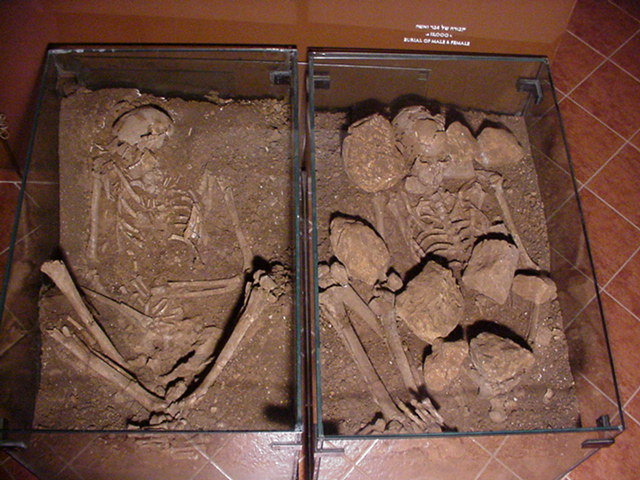
- Skeletons discovered at ʿAin Mallaha

- Location within Northeast Israel
- 33.086975°N 35.579159°E
- Periods: Epipalaeolithic
- Cultures: Natufian
- Location: Upper Galilee Regional Council, Northern District, Israel
- Region: Hula Valley

ʿAin Mallaha (Arabic: عين ملاحة) or Eynan (Hebrew: עינן) was an Epipalaeolithic settlement belonging to the Natufian culture, occupied circa 14,326–12,180 cal. BP. The settlement is an example of hunter-gatherer sedentism, a crucial step in the transition from foraging to farming.

ʿAin Mallaha has one of the earliest known archaeological evidence of dog domestication.

== Village ==
This site is located in the Hula Valley of northern Israel, 25 kilometres (16 mi) north of the Sea of Galilee, and is in an area surrounded by hills and located by an ancient lake, Lake Huleh. At the time of its Natufian inhabitance, the area was heavily forested in oak, almond, and pistachio trees.

Evidence of settlement at Mallaha or ʿAin Mallaha dates back to the Mesolithic period at circa 10,000 BCE. The first permanent village settlement of pre-agricultural times in Israel, Kathleen Kenyon describes the material remains found there as Natufian. The Natufian village was colonized in three phases. The first two phases had massive stone-built structures with smaller ones in the third phase. These phases occurred from 12,000 to 9600 BCE. The dwellings were cut into the earth, had subterranean floors, and walls that were built of dry stone. Wooden posts supported the roofs, which were probably thatches with brushwood or animal hides. Hearths were located within the dwellings. Kenyon describes the Natufian village as consisting of 50 circular, semi-subterranean, one-room huts, paved with flat slabs and surrounded by stone walls up to 1.2 meters (3.9 ft) high. The floors and walls of the homes were decorated in solid white or red, a simple and popular decorative motif in the Near East at the time.

== Diet ==
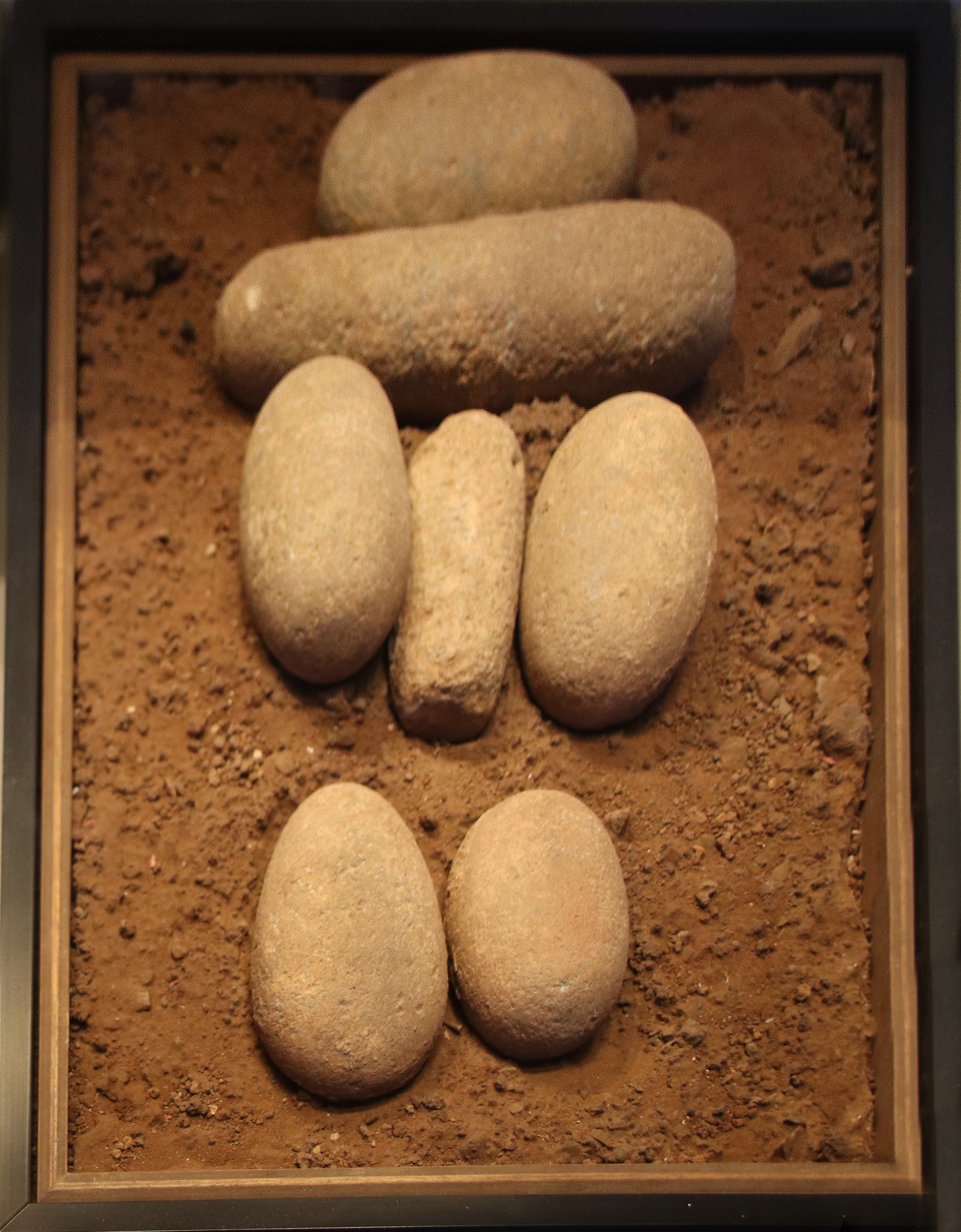
Schematic human figure made of pebbles, from ʿAin Mallaha, Early Natufian, 12000 BC.

The inhabitants of ʿAin Mallaha were sedentary hunter-gatherers; it is likely that they lived in ʿAin Mallaha year round, gathering food from the surrounding wild stands of edible vegetation, and hunting local game. The inhabitants used hand mortars for grinding wild nuts and grain, and stone sickles for cutting plants from wild stands. Many of these sickle stones hold "sickle-gloss," indicating they had been used to cut large numbers of plant stems, most likely wild wheat and barley. The inhabitants are known to have eaten gazelle, fallow deer, wild boar, red and roe deer, hare, tortoise, reptiles, and fish.

The inhabitants appear to have subsisted on fish from nearby Lake Hula, as well as by hunting and gathering; no evidence of animal domestication or cultivation has been found, with the conspicuous exception of dogs.

== Burial customs ==
It is likely that entire families were buried in the remains of their own houses, the houses being subsequently abandoned. During excavation, Perrot found one dwelling to contain the graves of 11 men, women, and children, many of them wearing elaborate decorations made from dentalium shells. In another dwelling (131), twelve individuals were found, one buried with her hand resting on the body of a small puppy. This burial of a human being with a domestic dog represents the earliest known archaeological evidence of dog domestication. One of the female burials has disarranged body parts and gazelle horn-cores placed near the head, David Wengrow has used this as evidence for the deep-history of human-animal hybrid motifs found in ancient beliefs, practices, and folklore.

== Excavation ==
ʿAin Mallaha was discovered in 1954 and salvage excavations were carried out under the supervision of Jean Perrot, Monique Lechevalier and François Valla of the CNRS. Since 2022, the site is excavated by Fanny Bocquentin and Lior Weissbrod.

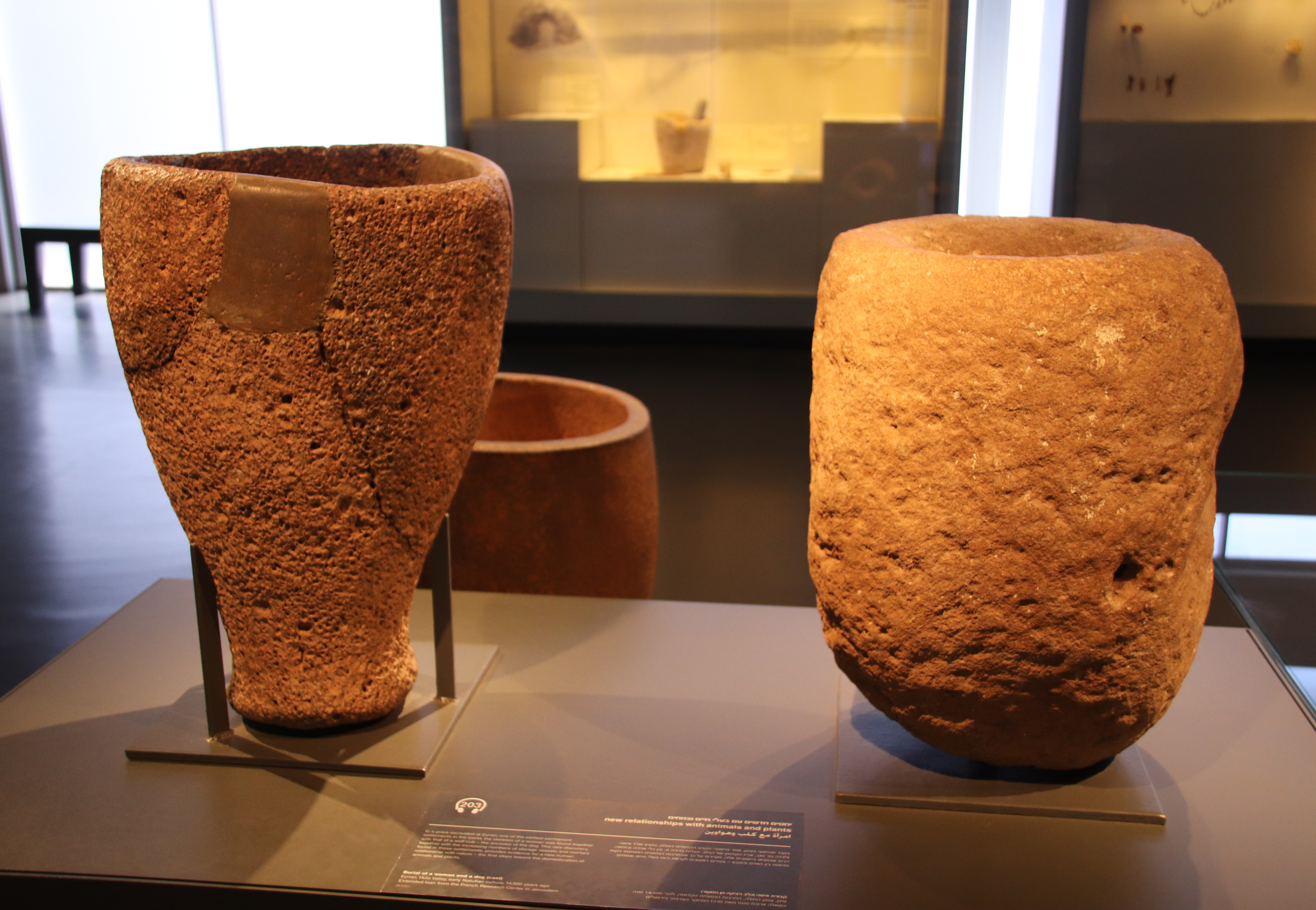
Limestone and basalt mortars, ʿAin Mallaha, Early Natufian, circa 12000 BC (Israel Museum, Jerusalem)

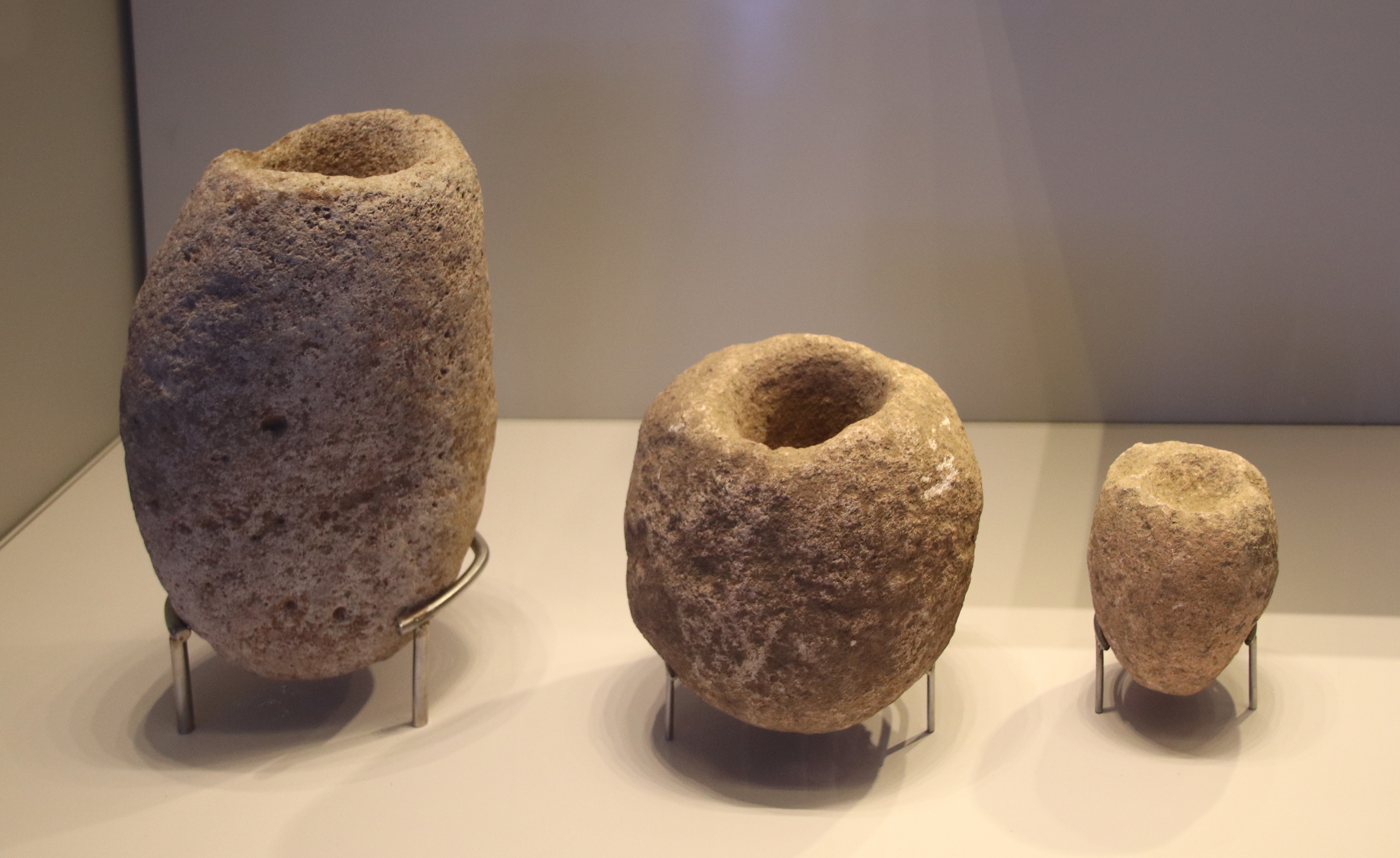
Stone Mortars from ʿAin Mallaha, Natufian period, 12500-9500 BC(Israel Museum, Jerusalem)

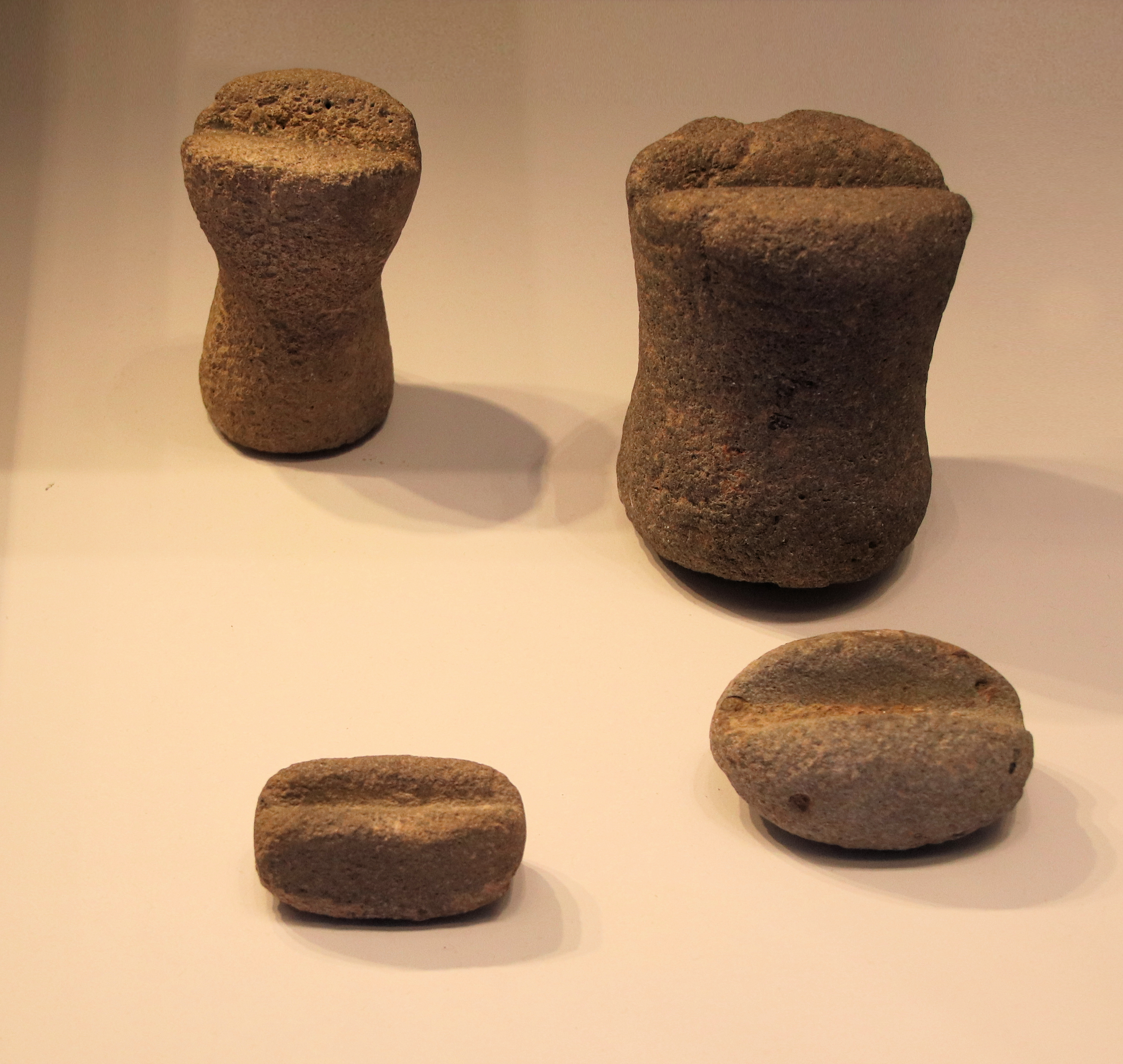
Basalt sharpening stones, ʿAin Mallaha and Nahal Oren, Natufian Culture, 12500-9500 BC (Israel Museum, Jerusalem)

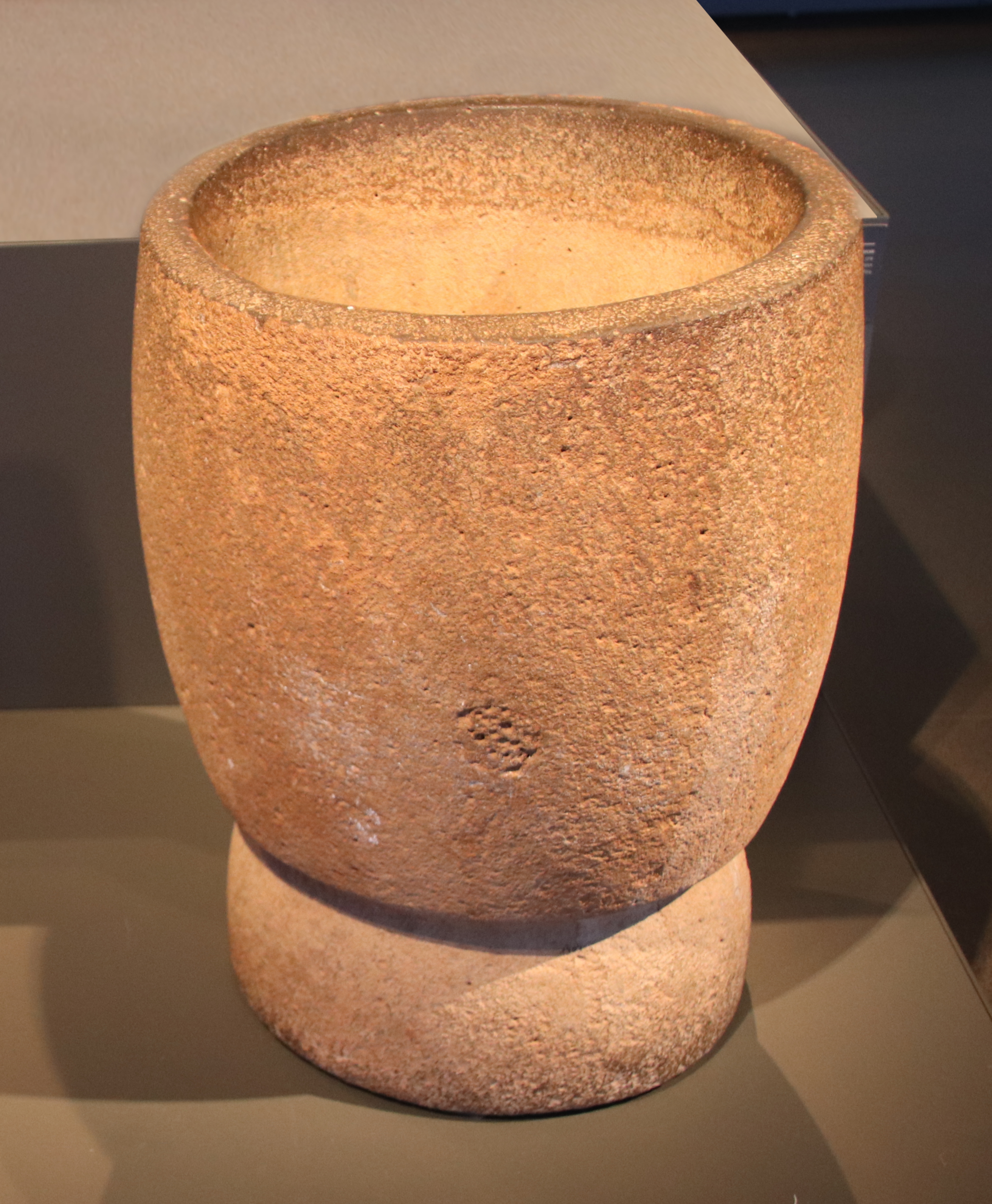
ʿAin Mallaha Epipaleolithic mortar (Israel Museum, Jerusalem)

== See also ==
- Mallaha
- Archaeology of Israel
