= Raqefet Cave =

Prehistoric archaeological site in Israel

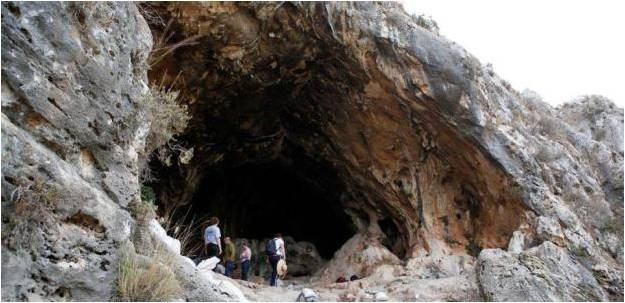
- Raqefet Cave entrance

- Location in Israel Raqefet Cave (Israel)
- Periods: Middle Paleolithic, Upper Paleolithic, Epipalaeolithic
- Cultures: Mousterian, Levantine Aurignacian, Natufian
- Location: Mount Carmel
- Region: Israel

Raqefet Cave (Cyclamen Cave) is a prehistoric archaeological site located on Mount Carmel in northern Israel, with Late Natufian remains and evidence of earlier occupation. Its Natufian cemetery has yielded evidence interpreted as the deliberate lining of graves with flowering plants.

== Location and excavation history ==
Raqefet Cave lies on the southeastern side of Mount Carmel, along Wadi Raqefet. It was discovered by Ya'aqov Olami in 1956 and excavated by Tamar Noy and Eric Higgs between 1970 and 1972. Renewed fieldwork began in 2004 with a small excavation intended to verify the site's stratigraphy.

== Archaeological chronology ==
Mousterian remains were found at the cave, which was recorded as Site 187 in Olami's survey. The cave also contains remains from the Levantine Aurignacian.

A study published in 2013 reported radiocarbon dates from three individuals in two double burials spanning approximately 13,700–11,700 calibrated years Before Present (cal BP).

Although the Natufian remains have conventionally been assigned to the Late Natufian on the basis of their stone tools, a 2017 radiocarbon study placed some burials at approximately 14,000–13,000 cal BP. The authors identified chronological overlap with Early Natufian deposits at nearby el-Wad Terrace, despite differences between the sites' stone-tool assemblages. They concluded that crescent-shaped stone tools known as lunates were not reliable chronological markers in the Mount Carmel region during this interval.

== Natufian cemetery ==
The cave's Natufian remains have been interpreted as evidence of use primarily as a burial ground rather than a residential settlement. A study published in 2013 reported the remains of 29 individuals, including adults, children and infants. All but one were clustered in an area of about 15 square metres (160 sq ft). Most burials were single interments, although four were double burials.

The same study described evidence of plant linings in four graves. The evidence included impressions of stems and leaves in a thin mud layer lining the graves, together with phytoliths, microscopic mineral structures formed in plant tissues. The authors interpreted these findings as evidence that plant bedding, including flowering plants such as Judean sage, had been deliberately laid in the graves before burial.

A study published in 2020 described an incised human figure on a stone slab from the cemetery. The authors interpreted the figure as probably depicting a person dancing.

=== Proposed beer production ===
Evidence from the site indicates that plants were used as food before the advent of agriculture. A study published in 2018 by Li Liu and colleagues in the Journal of Archaeological Science: Reports examined residues and use-wear in three stone mortars from the cave. Using experimental comparisons, the authors interpreted these traces as evidence that two mortars cut into boulders had been used to store plant foods, including malted wheat or barley, while a mortar cut into the bedrock had been used for food preparation and beer brewing. They suggested that beer was consumed at ritual feasts around 13,000 years ago and described their findings as the earliest known archaeological evidence of cereal-based beer brewing.

In a 2019 commentary in the same journal, David Eitam argued that the evidence did not necessarily demonstrate brewing and proposed that the narrow conical mortars had been used to dehusk and grind barley into flour for bread. Liu and colleagues published a response defending their interpretation. They argued that the use-wear supported the proposed storage function of the boulder mortars and that experimental comparisons distinguished starch damage associated with malting and brewing from that caused by other food-processing methods.

== Gallery ==
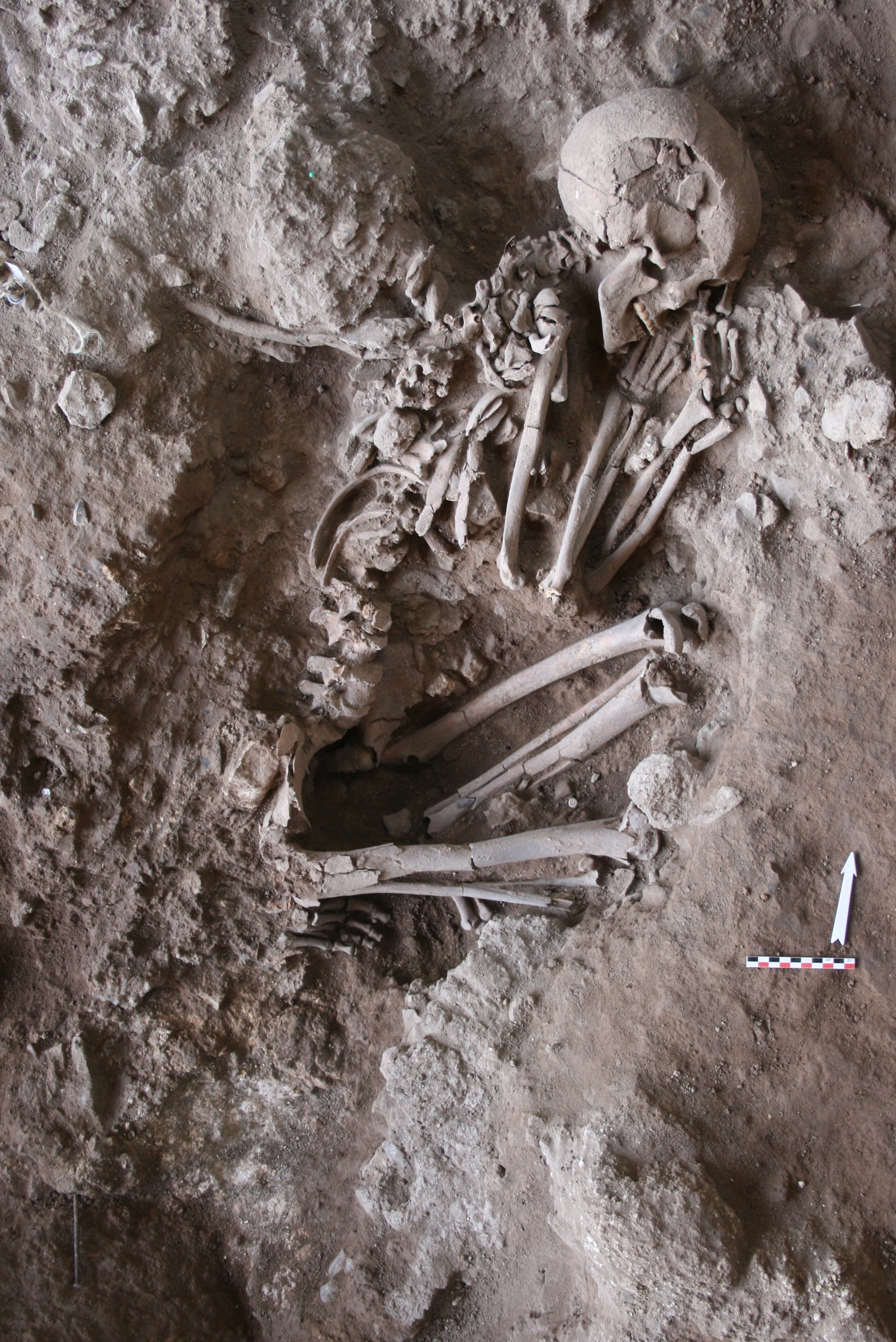
Human remains

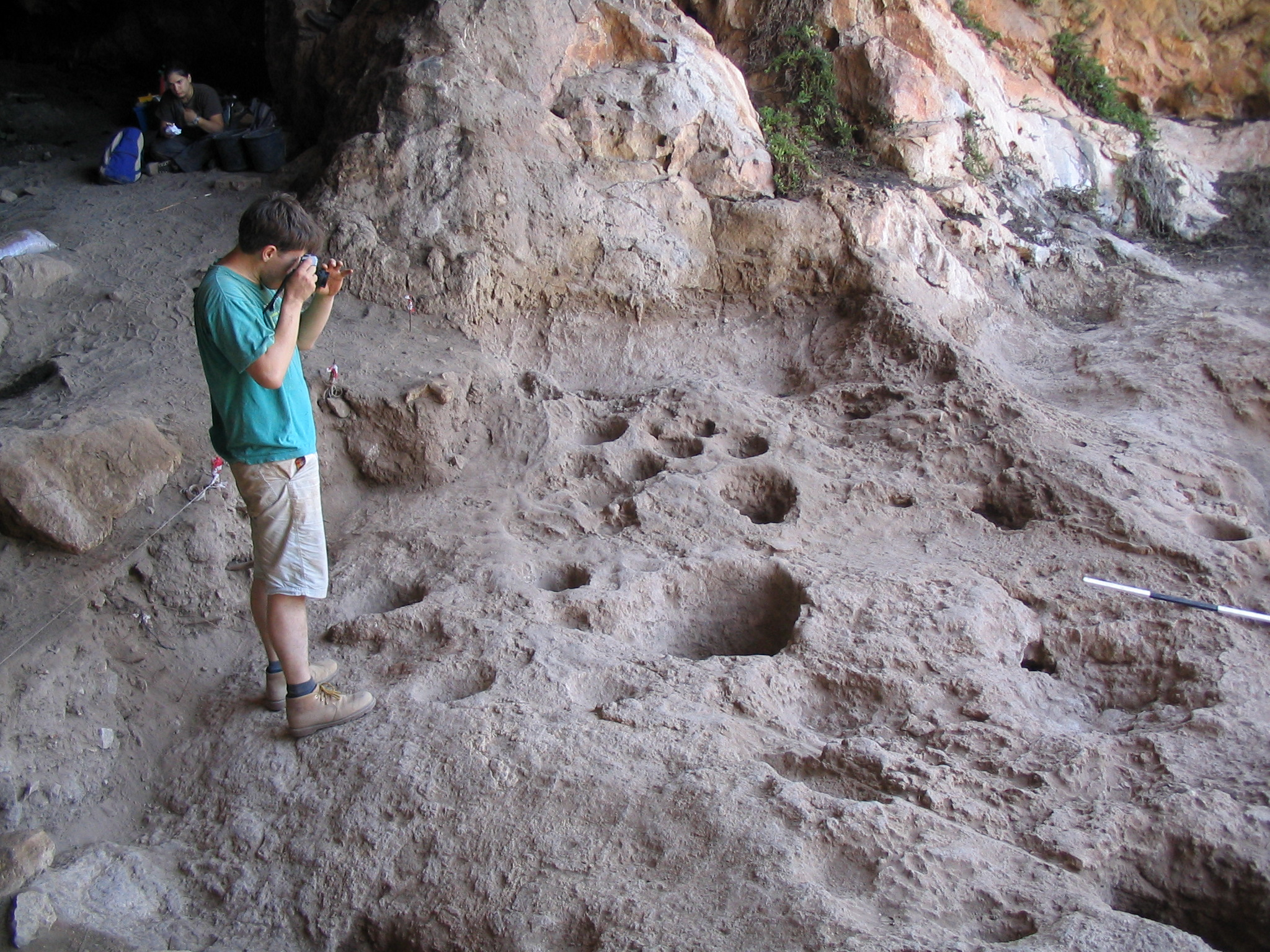
Bedrock mortars

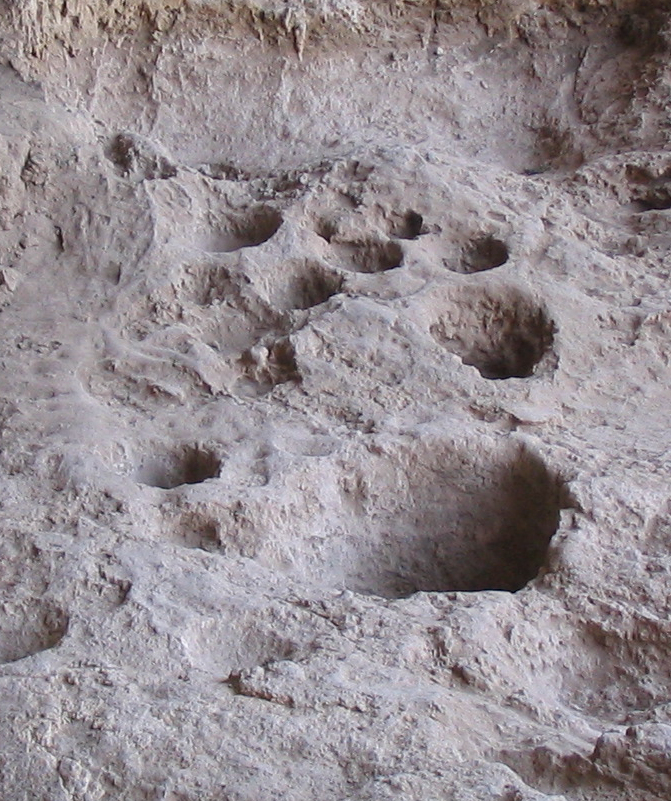
Raqefet Cave rock mortars.

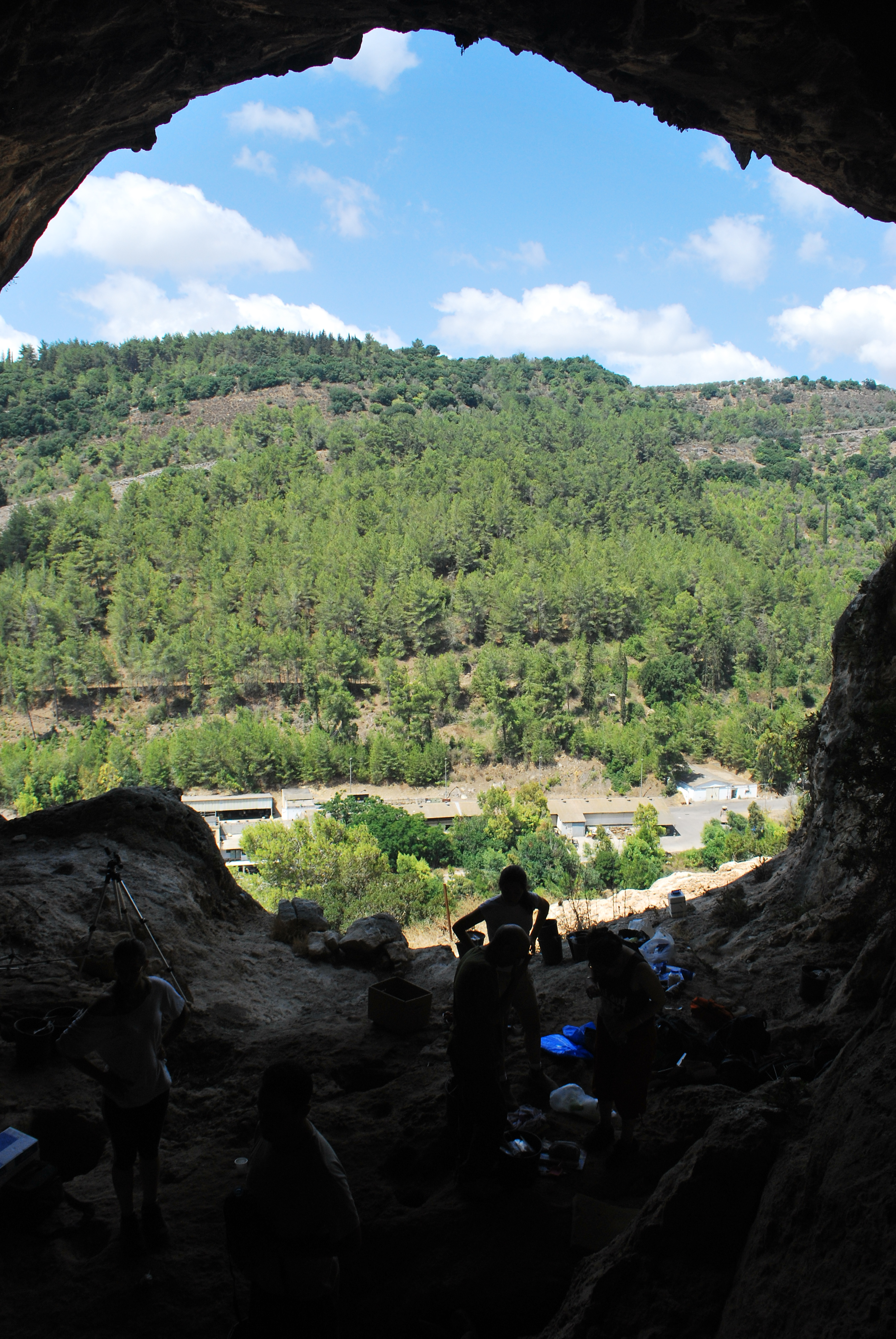
View of the valley from inside the cave

== See also ==
- History of beer

== Bibliography ==
- Nadel, Dani; Rosenberg, Danny (2016). "A grid-like incised pattern inside a Natufian bedrock mortar, Raqefet Cave, Israel". Journal of Lithic Studies. 3 (3): 337–557. doi:10.2218/jls.v3i3.1467.
