= Wadi Hammeh 27 =

Late Epipalaeolithic archaeological site

Wadi Hammeh 27 is a Late Epipalaeolithic archaeological site in Pella, Jordan. It consists of the remains of a large settlement dating to the Early Natufian period, about 14,500 to 14,000 years ago.

The people of the Natufian culture were nomadic foragers, but at Wadi Hammeh 27 they built large, durable dwellings that were maintained and revisited over many generations. The excavators of the site therefore interpret it as a substantial 'base camp' and forerunner of the first sedentary villages that were established in the area in the succeeding Pre-Pottery Neolithic period.

In 2022 and 2024, excavations led by Phillip C. Edwards of La Trobe University uncovered a large multiple burial beneath the site's lowest occupation phase. The burial ground was established around 12,500 BCE and its boundary marked with complex features before houses were built directly over the graves; although the settlement itself was occupied for roughly 500 years, no further burials were made at the site afterward.
