= Baaz Rockshelter =

Prehistoric archaeological site in Syria

Baaz Rock Shelter
- Cultures: Natufian
- Location: Anti-Lebanon Mountains

History
- Archaeologists: University of Tübingen
- Discovered: 1999
- Excavation dates: 1999-2004

Baaz Rockshelter is a prehistoric archaeological site in Syria. Located in the foothills of the Anti-Lebanon Mountains about 50 kilometres (31 mi) northeast of Damascus, the site consists of a small (6 by 10 metres or 20 by 33 feet) rock shelter overlooking the nearby plains and springs.

Excavations have revealed that it was intermittently occupied during the Upper Palaeolithic (c. 34,000 to 32,000 years ago and 23,000 to 21,000 years ago), Late Epipalaeolithic (c. 11,200 to 10,200 years ago), and Pre-Pottery and Pottery Neolithic.

The site was discovered in 1999 and excavated by a team from the University of Tübingen between 1999 and 2004.
