= Sickle-gloss =

Sickle-gloss, also known as sickle sheen, is a silica residue found on blades such as sickles and scythes. Its presence indicates that the tool has been used to cut the stems of cereals, which are rich in silica.

The gloss or residue forms due to the abrasive action of silica found in both wild and cultivated cereal grasses. Therefore, the presence of sickle-gloss on a reaping tool does not necessarily indicate a connection to agriculture. The earliest known occurrence of sickle-gloss is on flint-knapped blades from the Natufian culture (12,500 to 9500 BC) in the Middle East, mainly in Israel.

== Characteristics ==
Sickle-gloss has been recognised as a characteristic of reaping grasses since at least the 1930s. There is general consensus that sickle-gloss forms after reaping grasses and can develop within just a few hours of work. However, it may take more time for enough sickle-gloss to accumulate to be preserved archaeologically. It is also speculated that gloss may form from cutting canes or reeds, woodworking, or even hoeing or digging. Distinguishing between different types of gloss may be possible at either the macro or microscopic level.

== Patterns ==
The direction of gloss lines is relative to the working edge of a sickle. Gloss lines rarely extend more than 5 mm onto the face of the blade. In later periods, sickles were more likely to exhibit gloss patterns that were parallel or nearly parallel to the working edges.

== Usage ==
At sites where sickle-gloss is found, it is reasonable to assume that the sickles were used for varying durations. Sickles without gloss may be considered unused or unfinished, as flint sickles typically develop sickle-gloss after only a few hours of use.

== Controversy ==
According to Lithics After the Stone Age: A Handbook of Stone Tools from the Levant, there is considerable debate about the formation of sickle-gloss. The discussion revolves around whether the gloss results from the abrasive polishing of silica on the flint artifact or from a silica coating transferred from the grasses being harvested. Cutting Graminae Tools and 'Sickle Gloss' Formation outlines four main theories regarding the origins of sickle-gloss:

- Gloss results from working with plant materials, where the tool forms a silica gel that incorporates small plant fragments.
- Gloss forms from working with plant materials, where the tool creates a silica gel, but the plant material remains separate from the gel.
- Sickle gloss is purely mechanical or involves both chemical and mechanical processes.
- Sickle gloss results from a combination of factors, including the aforementioned theories.

Additionally, there is debate about the significance of sickle-gloss in understanding the rise of agriculture and its role as an indicator of reaping grasses in Epipaleolithic and early Neolithic societies. This issue is less relevant in late Neolithic societies due to their documented use of sickles for agriculture.
