= Palestinian archaeology =

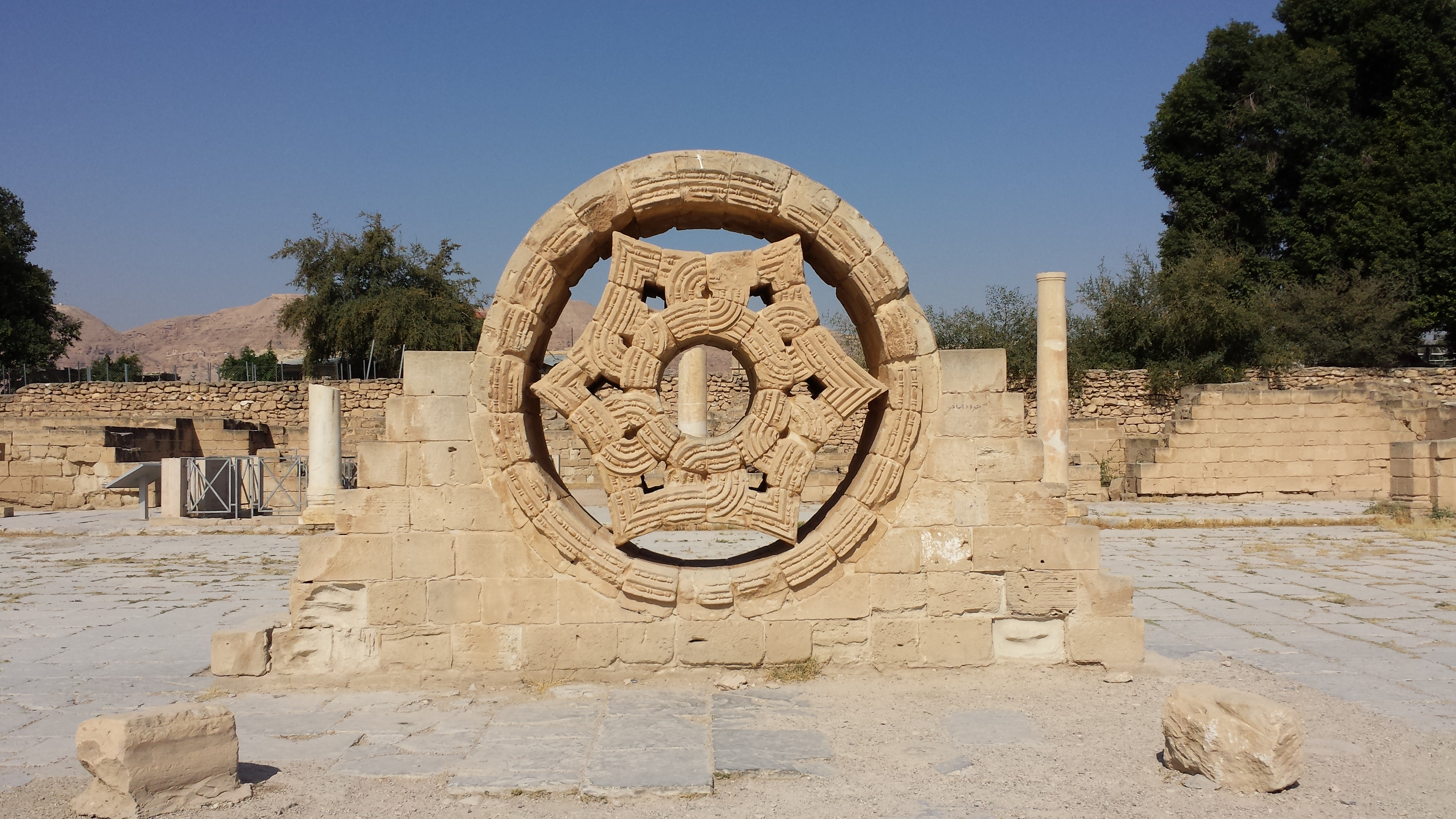
Decorated and reconstructed stone window from Hisham's Palace in Jericho

Palestinian archaeology is the study of archaeology in present-day Palestine, stretching from prehistory through three millennia of documented history. Besides its centrality to the study of biblical archaeology, the region of ancient Palestine is one of the most important to an understanding of the history of the earliest peoples of the Stone Age. Palestinian archaeology is marked by a degree of acrimony not shared in other area studies in the field between archaeologists who see biblical scriptures as legitimate historical documents and scientific archaeologists who see the hard data from excavations as being incompatible with the biblical "historical" record.

Palestinian archaeology also refers to the practice of archaeology by Palestinians, both in the region of Palestine and the present day state of Palestine. Palestinian contributions to the study of archaeology in their own homeland have been obscured, and continue to be sidelined by the Israeli occupation.

== Origins ==
Modern Palestinian archaeology began to be practiced in the late nineteenth century, primarily by foreigners to Ottoman Palestine. Early expeditions lacked standardized methods for excavation and interpretation, and were often little more than treasure-hunting expeditions. A lack of awareness and attention to the importance of stratigraphy to the dating of objects, led to the digging of long trenches through the middle of a site that made follow-up work by later archaeologists more difficult.

One early school of modern Palestinian archaeology revolved around the powerful and authoritative figure of William F. Albright (1891–1971). His scholarship and that of the Albright school, which tended to lean toward a favouring of biblical narratives, were treated with great deference during his lifetime. Albright himself held that Frederick Jones Bliss (1857–1939) was the Father of Palestinian archaeology; however, the work of Bliss is not well known to those in the field. J.A. Blakely attributes this to the actions of Bliss' successor at the Palestine Exploration Fund, R.A.S. Macalister (1870–1950), who seems to have buried his predecessors' achievements.

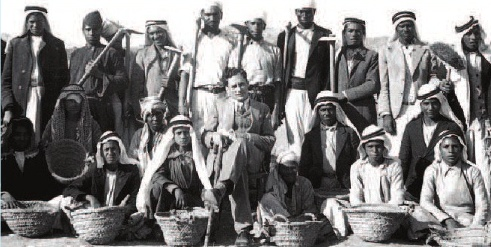
Baramki (centre, seated) with excavators at Hisham's Palace in 1937

Albright sat on the board of directors of the Palestine Oriental Society founded by Albert T. Clay. The work of this society was more ethnographic and anthropological than archaeological. Among its members was Tawfiq Canaan, a Palestinian doctor and one of several Palestinians focused on investigating Palestinian "material culture," as it related to folklore and customs. Canaan and Stephan Hanna Stephan, who also worked at the British-administered Department of Antiquities alongside Dmitri Baramki, contributed several articles to the society's journal. Hanna and Baramki also authored several archaeological papers for the Quarterly produced by the Department of the Antiquities.

While the importance of stratigraphy, typology and balk to a scientific study of sites became the norm sometime in the mid-twentieth century, the continued tendency to ignore data in favour of subjective interpretations invited criticism. Paul W. Lapp, for example, whom many thought would take up the mantle of Albright before his premature death in 1970, engaged in a harsh critique of the field, writing:

"Too much of Palestinian archaeology is an inflated fabrication [...] Too often a subjective interpretation, not based on empirical stratigraphic observation, is used to demonstrate the validity of another subjective interpretation. We assign close dates to a group of pots on subjective typological grounds and go on to cite our opinion as independent evidence for similarly dating a parallel group. Too much of Palestinian archaeology's foundation building has involved chasing ad hominem arguments around in a circle."

Archaeologist Shlomo Bunimovitz echoed this critique in "How Mute Stones Speak: Interpreting What We Dig Up", applying it to the "Israeli School" of Palestinian archaeology, as epitomized by Yigael Yadin, writing that,

"[...] despite its new scientific arsenal, biblical archaeology during the 1960s, 1970s and early 1980s was still parochial, highly pragmatic and bound to traditional interpretative frameworks. Slowly, however, as previous interpretative concepts were discarded, exciting new cultural/historical insights gradually came into view, even through old research strategies."

Thus, towards the end of the twentieth century, Palestinian archaeology became a more interdisciplinary practice. Today, scientists from different fields of expertise work together using new technologies to examine micro-remains, like seeds, or skeletal remains.

== Development ==
Besides the work of Dmitri Baramki and Stephan Hanna Stephan, and influence of Tawfiq Canaan on archaeologists with whom he was acquainted, like Kathleen Kenyon and Nelson Glueck, Palestinian contributions to the study of archaeology in their own country were largely unknown and unrecorded, and they had little ability to determine the areas of inquiry and focus.

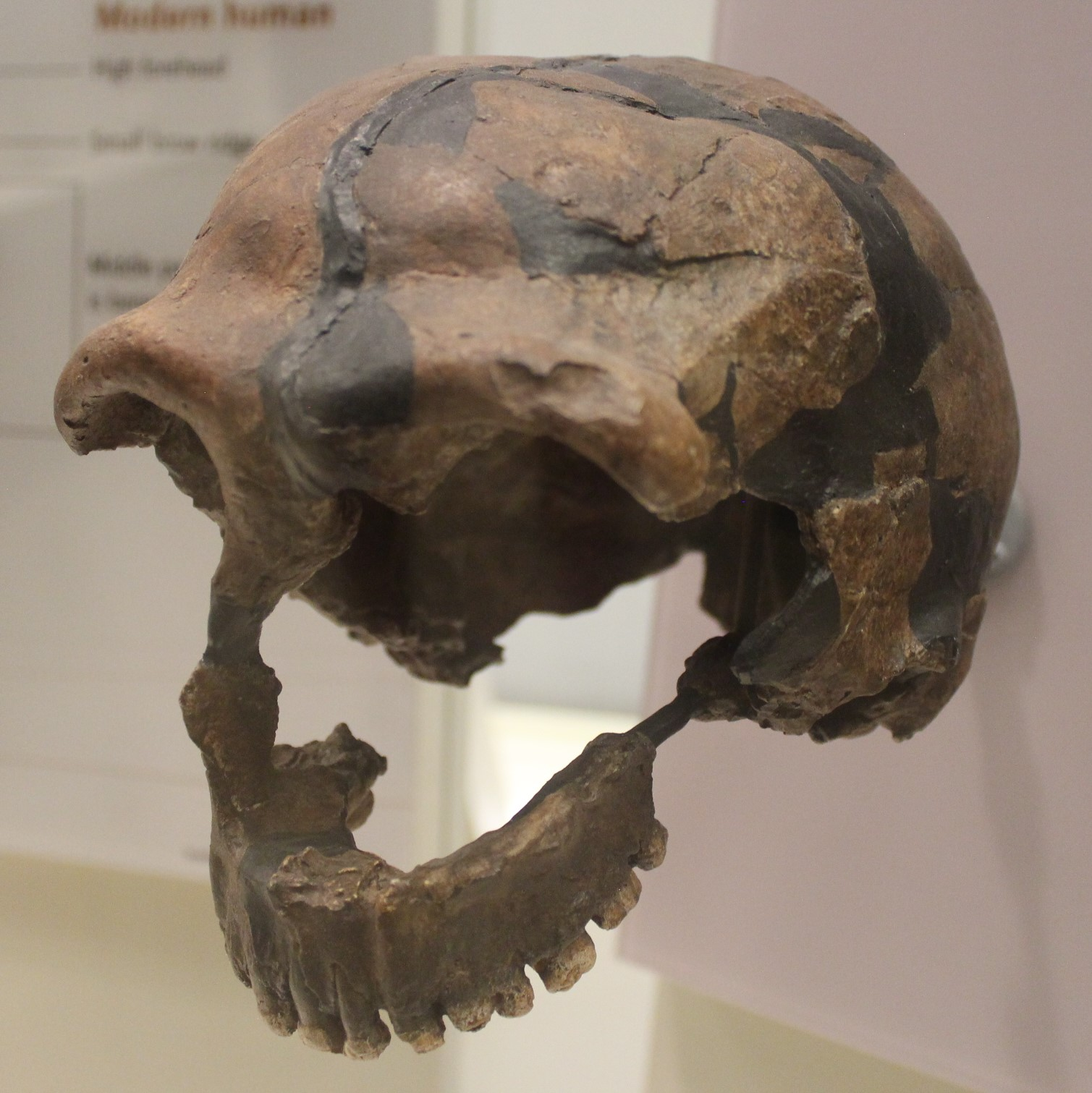
Replica of Tabun 1, National Museum of Natural History. The skull was discovered by Yusra, the first Palestinian archaeologist to excavate in the field.

It was only recently established for example, that the first Palestinian archaeologist to excavate in the field was a woman named Yusra, who worked with Dorothy Garrod on excavating the Tabun Cave between 1929 and 1935. Credited with having discovered the Tabun I Neanderthal skull belonging to a female, Yusra's last name, her fate after completing her fieldwork, and even the exact village of origin in the Haifa area remain unknown.

After the 1948 Arab-Israeli war, the West Bank was administered by Jordan (1950) and the Gaza Strip was administered by Egypt. In the West Bank archaeological excavations were carried out by its Department of Antiquities, as had been the case throughout the British Mandate in Palestine. The department was made up of Muslim and Christian officials and headed by the British archaeologist Gerald Lankester Harding until 1956, and field archaeology was conducted primarily by foreigners, in expeditions such as those by the École Biblique at Tell el-Farah (1946–1960) and Khirbet Qumran (1951–1956). Awni Dajani was appointed as a director with authority over sites in the West Bank; the post had initially been offered to Baramki on Harding's recommendation but he turned it down. The Egyptian Department of Antiquities did not carry out major excavations, although 'Abd el-Mohsen el-Khashab discovered the Gaza synagogue during an excavation in the region in 1965.

Rising nationalistic pressures led to Harding's dismissal in 1956 and thereafter, the Department of Antiquities was headed by Jordanian nationals. The Nablus branch of the Department of Antiquities was headed by Fawzi Zaydan from 1956 to 1967, and a few skilled Palestinian fieldworkers were involved in work at the excavation sites during this period, like Naṣr Dyab Dwekat. Dwekat never authored or published a paper, but he participated in excavations of Neapolis, the Roman city of Nablus, and Sebastia, and on excavations at the archaeological sites of Tell Balata (Canaanite Shechem, supervised by Ernest Wright for the American Schools of Oriental Research between 1956 and 1964), Tell Dothan, Tell Ta'anach, and Tell es-Sultan (ancient Jericho undertaken by the British School of Archaeology). He also continued to work on the field under the different administrations to follow until his death in 2011.

After Israel occupied the area during the 1967 war, all antiquities in the area came under the control of the Archaeological Staff Officer, who is the head of the Archaeology Department of the Civil Administration (ADCA). Though the Hague Convention prohibits the removal of cultural property from militarily occupied areas, both foreign and Israeli archaeologists mounted extensive excavations that have been criticized as overstepping the bounds of legitimate work to protect endangered sites. Vast amounts of new archaeological data have been uncovered in these explorations, although critics say that "relatively little effort was made to preserve or protect archaeological remains from the later Islamic and Ottoman periods, which were of direct relevance to the areas Muslim inhabitants." By 2007, the ADCA had been involved with over 6,000 archaeological sites in the West Bank including surveys and excavations, the vast majority of which had been kept from public and academic knowledge.

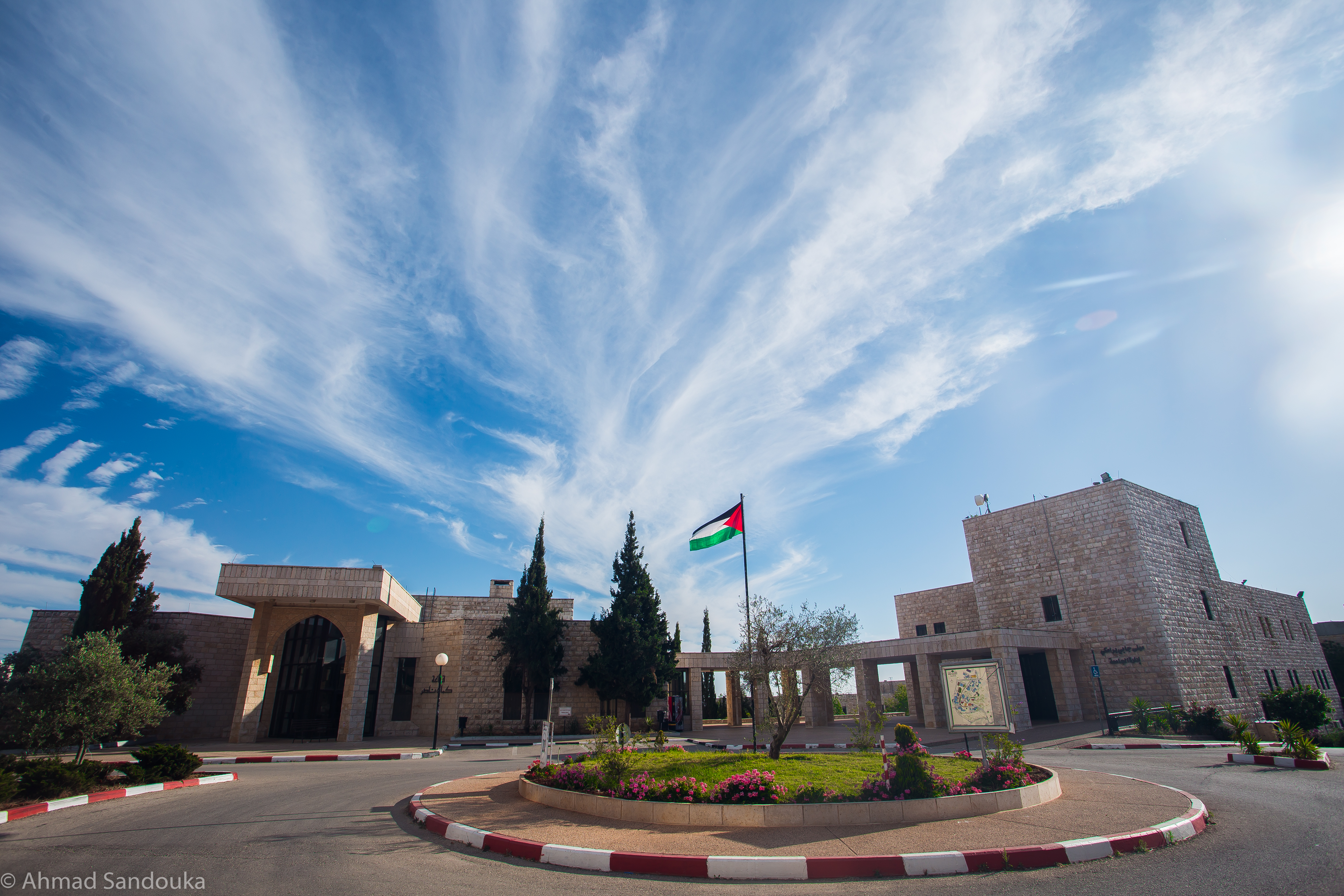
Birzeit University was the first Palestinian university to offer a course in archaeology.

The first Palestinian historiography of Palestinian archaeology was authored by Baramki in 1969. Birzeit University in Ramallah was the first Palestinian university to offer a course of study in archaeology in 1970, and established the Palestinian Archaeology Institute in 1987, with the help of Albert Glock, who headed the university's archaeology department at the time. Glock's objective was to help develop an archaeological program that would emphasize the Palestinian presence in Palestine, informed by his belief that, "Archaeology, as everything else, is politics, and my politics [are those] of the losers." Glock was killed in the West Bank by unidentified gunmen in 1992. But the program he helped develop continued, with researchers from Bir Zeit University continuing excavations in Tell Jenin in 1993, building on the work of previous university excavations undertaken there and at Tell Taannek between 1976 and 1986.

Al-Najah University in Nablus and Al-Quds University in East Jerusalem also adopted teaching programs in archaeology, but only Al-Quds has been able to sustain the program, offering both an undergraduate degree in archaeology and a Master's program in restoration.

The Archaeological Encyclopedia of the Holy Land notes that, "The 1990s have seen the development of Palestinian archaeological activities, with a focus on tell archaeology on the one hand ([Hamdan] Taha and [Moain] Sadeq) and on the investigation of the indigenous landscape and cultural heritage on the other ([Khaled] Nashef and M. Abu Khalaf)."

Moain Sadeq was one of the founders of the Palestinian Archaeology Institute's Gaza branch, and is an expert on Gaza's archaeology. In his role as Director of the Department of Antiquities in Gaza, Sadeq was involved in a number of archaeological projects, such as the Gaza Research Project which began in 1996 and was led by Louise Steel, Joanne Clarke, and Sadeq. The project searched for evidence of archaeological remains dating to the Bronze Age in the region. Sadeq discovered a Bronze Age site in 1996, al-Moghraqa, which became one of the foci of the Gaza Research Project and underwent excavation. In 1999, Sadeq and Peter Fischer led excavations at Tell el-‘Ajjul which was last excavated in the 1930s. At the same time he also worked with Pierre de Miroschedji of the French National Centre for Scientific Research to lead an excavation at a newly discovered Bronze Age settlement south of Gaza City: Tell es-Sakan. Along with Hamdan Taha, the head of the Department of Antiquities, Sadeq was involved with negotiations with Israel about the return of artefacts excavated in Palestine during the Israeli occupation.

Khaled Nashef, a Palestinian archaeologist at Bir Zeit and editor of the university's Journal of Palestinian Archaeology, writes that for too long the history of Palestine has been written by Christian and Israeli "biblical archaeologists", and that Palestinians must themselves re-write that history, beginning with the archaeological recovery of ancient Palestine. Such a perspective can also be seen in the practices of Hamdan Taha, the director of the Palestinian National Authority's Department of Antiquities and Cultural Heritage, responsible for overseeing preservation and excavation projects that involve both internationals and Palestinians, as equals.

Gerrit van der Kooij, an archaeologist at Leiden University in the Netherlands who worked with Taha, says that, "It doesn't surprise me that outsiders become frustrated [... Taha] sticks by his policy of equal partnership. That means Palestinians must be involved at every step," from planning and digging to publishing. In Van der Kooij's opinion, this policy is "fully justified and adds more social value to the project."

Dever submits that the recent insistence that Palestinian archaeology and history be written by "real Palestinians" stems from the influence of those he terms the "biblical revisionists", such as Keith W. Whitelam, Thomas L. Thompson, Philip R. Davies and Niels Peter Lemche. Whitelam's book, The Invention of Ancient Israel: The Silencing of Palestinian History (1996) and Thompson's book, The Mythic Past: Biblical Archaeology and the Myth of Israel (1999) were both translated into Arabic shortly after their publication. Dever speculates that, "Nashef and many other Palestinian political activists have obviously read it." Harshly critical of both books, Dever accuses Whitelam's thesis that Israelis and "Jewish-inspired Christians" invented Israel, thus deliberately robbing Palestinians of their history, of being "extremely inflammatory" and "bordering on anti-Semitism", and Thompson's book of being "even more rabid."

Dever cites an editorial by Nashef published in the Journal of Palestinian Archaeology in July 2000 entitled, "The Debate on 'Ancient Israel': A Palestinian Perspective", that explicitly names the four "biblical revisionists" mentioned above, as evidence for his claim that their "rhetoric" has influenced Palestinian archaeologists. In the editorial itself, Nashef writes: "The fact of the matter is, the Palestinians have something completely different to offer in the debate on 'ancient Israel,' which seems to threaten the ideological basis of BAR (the American popular magazine, Biblical Archaeology Review, which turned down this piece - WGD): they simply exist, and they have always existed on the soil of Palestine ..."

The Gaza Strip's growing population led to pressures on housing, and new construction projects encountered archaeological remains. The Intiqal was established in 2017 to record and engage with this archaeology and train Palestinian archaeologists. The project was initially focused on two sites, Byzantine Church of Jabalia and Tell Umm el-'Amr, before expanding its remit at the request of the Ministry of Tourism and Antiquities.

== Archaeological sites ==
According to the Palestinian Authority's Ministry of Tourism and Antiquity, in the West Bank and Gaza Strip there are 12,000 archaeological and cultural heritage sites, 60,000 traditional houses, 1,750 major sites of human settlement, and 500 sites which have been excavated to date, 60 of which are major sites.

=== Archaeological sites in the West Bank ===
This is a selection of important sites, not a comprehensive summary.

==== Belameh ====
Belameh, located a little over one mile (1.6 km) south of Jenin, is an important Bronze Age site identified with the ancient Ibleam, a Canaanite city mentioned in the Egyptian Royal Archive that was conquered by Thutmose III in the 15th century BCE. Ibleam is also mentioned in three passages of the Hebrew Bible. The location was called Belemoth during Roman-Byzantine times, and Castellum Beleismum in the Crusader sources.

The site was initially discovered by Victor Guérin in 1874, then by Gottlieb Schumacher in 1910, and Bellarmino Bagatti in 1974. Later on, excavations in Khirbet Belameh, led by Hamdan Taha of the Palestinian Antiquities Department, began in 1996. These have focused on a water tunnel carved out of rock sometime in the Late Bronze or Early Iron Age that connected the city at the top of the hill to its water source at the bottom, a spring known as Bir es-Sinjib. The tunnel allowed inhabitants to walk through it undetected, particularly useful during times of siege. There is evidence that the tunnel fell into disuse in the 8th century BCE, and that the entrance was subsequently rehabilitated some time in the Roman period, while the site itself shows occupation into the medieval period. Plans have been drawn up to turn the site into an archaeological park. G. Schumacher had described the water tunnel in 1908, and a small-scale excavation was conducted by Z. Yeivin in 1973. The water passage of Belameh is important for the understanding of ancient water systems in Palestine.

==== Bethlehem ====
As of April 2007, the procedures to add Bethlehem and the Church of the Nativity to the UNESCO World Heritage List have been initiated.

==== Dead Sea Scrolls ====
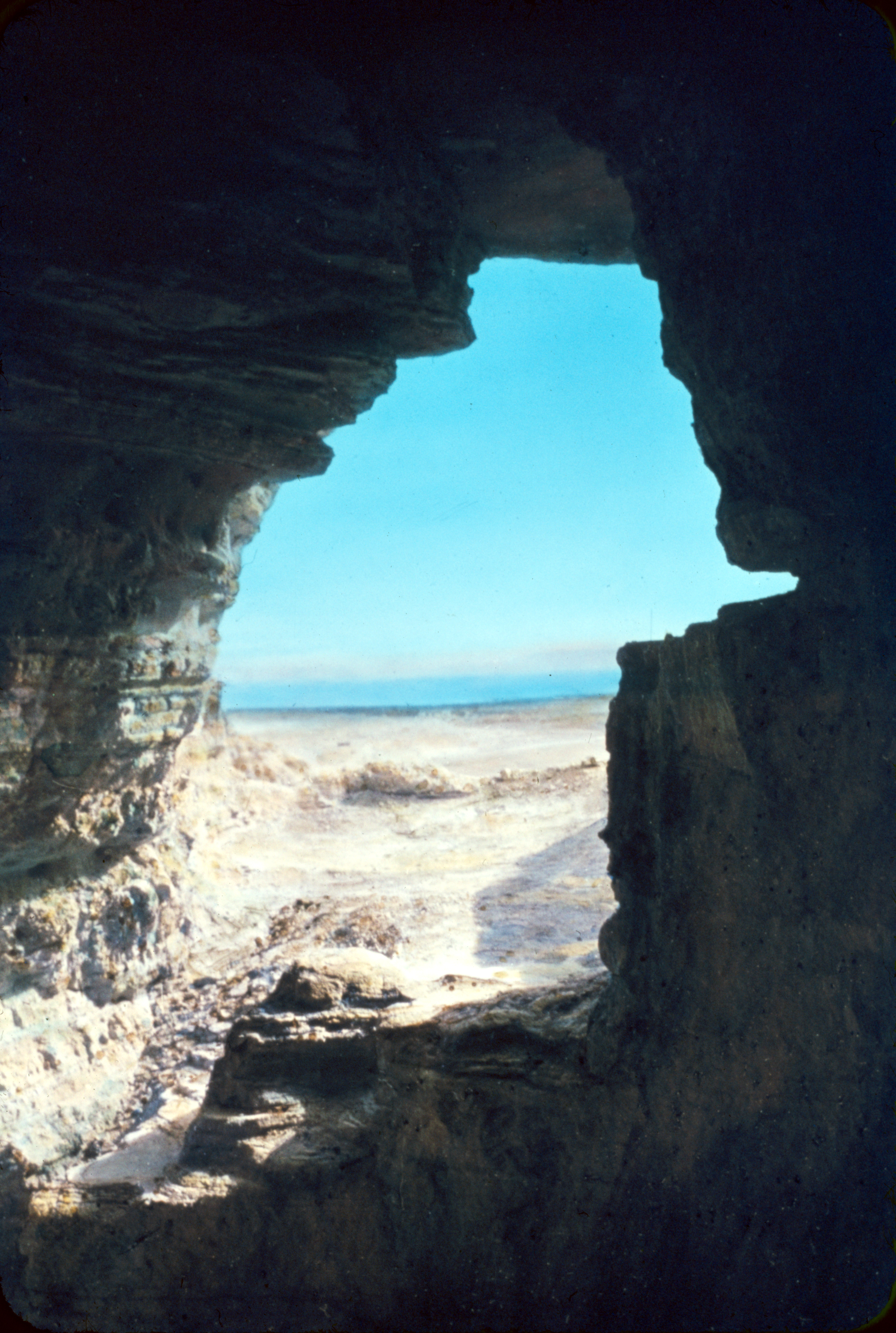
A view of the Dead Sea from a cave at Qumran in which some of the Dead Sea Scrolls were discovered

The Dead Sea Scrolls are 981 parchments discovered in 11 caves in the hills above Qumran between 1947 and 1956. The discovery of the scrolls was dubbed "[u]nquestionably the greatest manuscript find of modern times" by William F. Albright, and the majority are transcribed in a unique form of Hebrew now known as "Qumran Hebrew", and seen as a link between Biblical Hebrew and Mishnaic Hebrew. Some 120 scrolls are written in Aramaic, and a few of the biblical texts are written in Ancient Greek. Israel purchased some of the parchments, believed to have been composed or transcribed between 1 BCE and 1 CE, after they were first unearthed by a Bedouin shepherd in 1947. The remainder were acquired by Israel from the Rockefeller Museum in the 1967 war.

When 350 participants from 25 countries gathered at a conference at the Israel Museum marking the fiftieth anniversary of their discovery, Amir Drori, head of the Israel Antiquities Authority (IAA), said that the 2,000-year-old documents were legally acquired and an inseparable part of Jewish tradition. A Palestinian academic, Hamdan Taha, responded that Israel's capture of the works after the 1967 war was theft "which should be rectified now"., Israel is now digitally photographing the thousands of fragments that make up the Dead Sea Scrolls in order to make them freely available on the Internet.

==== Hisham's Palace ====
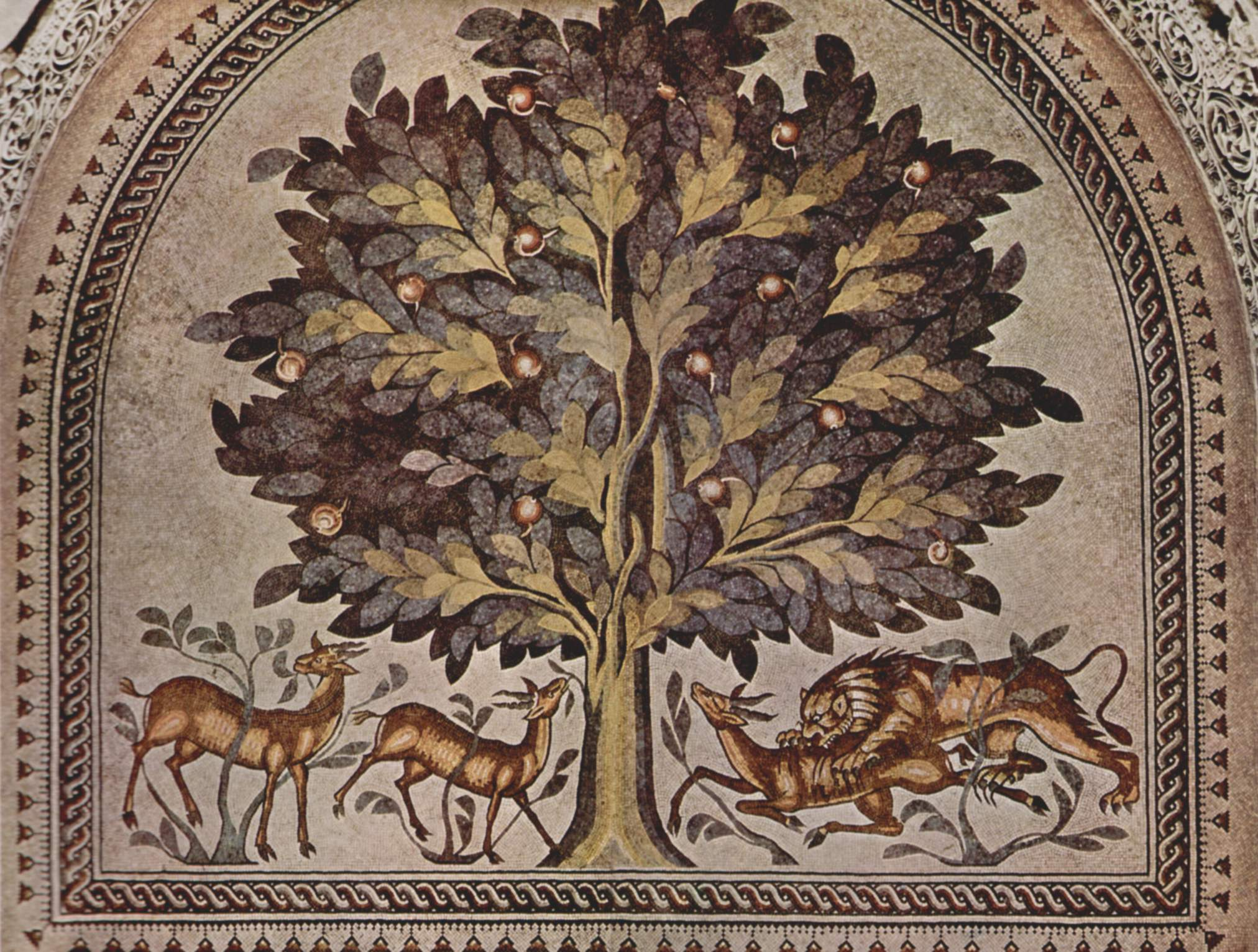
An Umayyad mosaic from Hisham's Palace, also known as Khirbat al-Mafjar, near Jericho

An Umayyad era winter palace, the first major excavations at the site were carried out by Dmitri Baramki in the 1930s. The site is most renowned for its intricate mosaics, including one of the largest to be uncovered intact in the world and featuring a depiction of a tree of life.

==== Nablus ====
The Old City of Nablus consists of seven quarters representing a distinctive style of traditional urban architecture in Palestine. Founded in 72 CE by the emperor Vespasian under the name Neapolis, the city flourished during the Byzantine and Umayyad periods, becoming the seat of a bishopric. Monuments in the city include "nine historic mosques (four built on Byzantine churches and five from the early Islamic period), an Ayyubid mausoleum, and a 17th-century church, but most buildings are Ottoman-era structures such as 2 major khans, 10 hammams (bathhouses), 30 olive-oil soap factories (7 of which were functioning), 2850 historic houses and exceptional family palaces, 18 Islamic monuments and 17 sabeel (water fountains)." A few monuments within the Old City date back to the Byzantine and Crusader periods. A Roman-era aqueduct system runs under the city, part of which had recently been preserved by the municipality and opened for visitors.

According to Hamdan Taha, great damage was inflicted on the historic core of the city during Israeli military incursions in 2002–2003. Taha's claim was confirmed by a series of reports produced by UNESCO that noted that pursuant to military operations undertaken in April 2002, hundreds of buildings in the Old City were affected, sixty-four of which were severely damaged. Of these, seventeen were designated as being of particular significance to world heritage, as per an inventory of sites prepared by Graz University between 1997 and 2002. According to UNESCO, reconstruction costs are estimated at tens of millions USD, though "the loss of irreplaceable heritage damage cannot be determined financially."

==== Sebastia ====
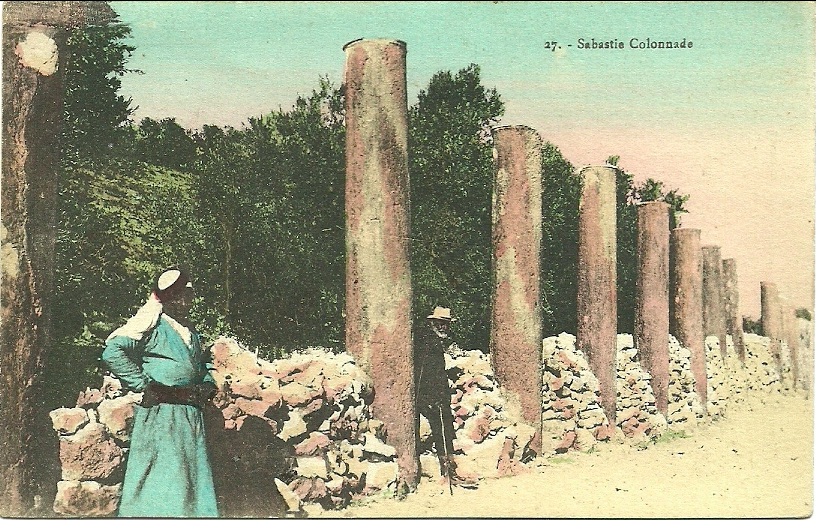
Sebastia columns, postcard from ca 1925 by Karimeh Abbud

Sebastia, Nablus contains ruins from several successive empires who ruled Palestine over the millennia, all within and directly adjacent to the existing Palestinian village. Maintenance and access to the site has traditionally been operated by Palestinians but recently the Israeli government is trying to take it over.

==== Tel es-Sultan ====
Tel es-Sultan (meaning the "Sultan's Hill") is located in Jericho, approximately two kilometers from the city center. Kathleen Kenyon's excavations at the site beginning in 1951, established that it was one of the earliest sites of human habitation, dating back to 9000 BCE. The mound contains several layers attesting to its habitation throughout the ages.

Despite recognition of its importance by archaeologists, the site is not presently included on the World Heritage List. In April 2007, Hamdan Taha announced that the Palestinian Authority's Department of Antiquities and Cultural Heritage had begun the procedures for its nomination.

==== Challenges posed by the Israeli–Palestinian conflict ====
Construction of the Israeli West Bank barrier has damaged and threatens to damage a number of sites of interest to Palestinian archaeology in and around the Green Line, prompting condemnation from the World Archaeological Congress (WAC) and a call for Israel to abide by UNESCO conventions that protect cultural heritage. In the autumn of 2003, bulldozers preparing the ground for a section of the barrier that runs through Abu Dis in East Jerusalem damaged the remains of a 1,500-year-old Byzantine era monastery. Construction was halted to allow the Israel Antiquities Authority (IAA) to conduct a salvage excavation that recovered a mosaic, among other artifacts. Media reported that an IAA official media blamed the IDF for proceeding without procuring the opinion of the IAA.

Archaeological excavations in Silwan in East Jerusalem in search of the City of David carried out by the Israel Antiquities Authority are resulting in Palestinian displacement.

=== Archaeology in Gaza Strip ===
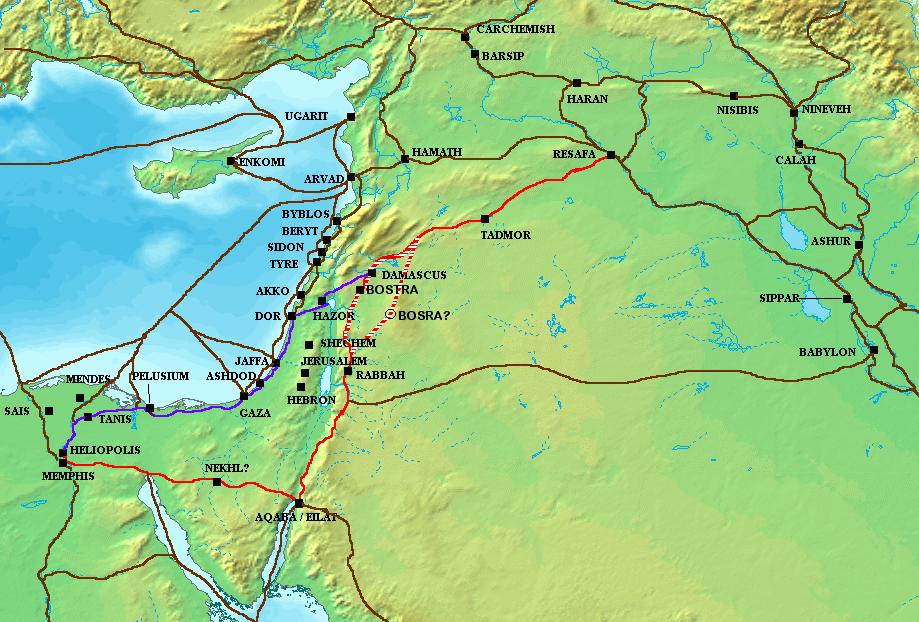
The Via Maris (purple), King's Highway (red), and other ancient Levantine trade routes, c. 1300 BCE

Gaza's history has been shaped by its location on the route linking North Africa to the fertile land of the Levant to the north. First strategically important to the Egyptian Pharaohs, it remained so for the many empires who sought to wield power in the region that followed. Gerald Butt, historian and author of Gaza at the Crossroads, explains that, "It's found itself the target of constant sieges—constant battles ... The people have been subject to rule from all over the globe. Right through the centuries Gaza's been at the centre of the major military campaigns in the Eastern Mediterranean." Gaza's main highway, the Salah al-Din Road, is one of the oldest in the world, and has been traversed by the chariots of the armies of the Pharaohs and Alexander the Great, the cavalry of the Crusaders, and Napoleon Bonaparte.

Having long been overlooked in archaeological research, the number of excavations in the Gaza Strip has multiplied since the establishment in 1995 of the Department of Antiquities in Gaza, a branch of the Ministry of Tourism and Antiquities of the Palestinian National Authority. Plans to build a national archaeological museum also promise to highlight the rich history of Gaza City, which has been described as, "one of the world's oldest living cities." Rapid urban development makes the need for archaeological research all the more urgent to protect the region's archaeological heritage. Population pressure in the tiny Gaza Strip is intense, which means that numerous potential archaeological sites may have been built over and lost. According to specialists, there is much more under ground and under the sea than what has been discovered to date. The Second Intifada led to the cessation of all excavations in 2001. Funding for excavations diminished when Hamas came to power in 2007.

==== Tell es-Sakan ====
Building projects in Gaza led to the discovery of new archaeological sites such as Tell es-Sakan, a Bronze Age fortified settlement discovered in 1998 where Sadeq led archaeological investigations with Pierre de Miroschedji between 1999 and 2000. The site began as an Egyptian settlement before it was abandoned and reinhabited by the Canaanites; Tell es-Sakan is the oldest known Egyptian fortification to have been excavated.

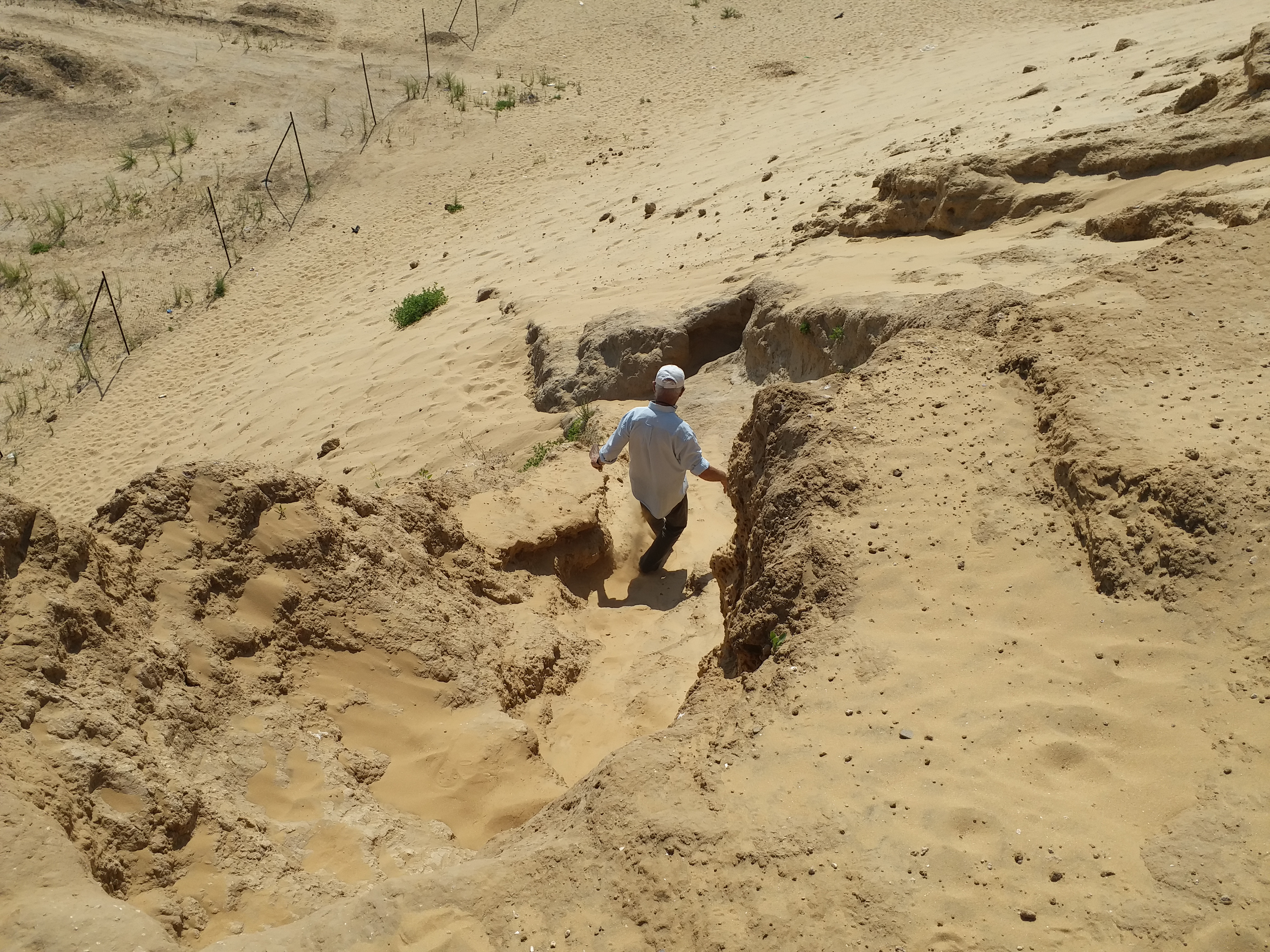
Tell es-Sakan was in use from c. 3300 BCE to 3000 BCE, and again from c. 2600 to 2300 BCE.

Tell es-Sakan is the only Early Bronze Age site in the Gaza Strip discovered to date. Located five kilometers south of Gaza City, the site was found by chance in 1998 during construction for a new housing complex, and work was halted to allow archaeological soundings to be conducted. The site covers an estimated 8–9 hectares (20–22 acres), and was inhabited in two main phases: an Egyptian city that lasted from about 3300 BCE to 3000 BCE and a Canaanite city inhabited from about 2600 BCE to 2300 BCE. Joint Franco-Palestinian excavations with UNDP support took place in 1999 and 2000, covering an area of 1,400 square meters.

==== Anthedon ====
Joint archaeological excavations by the Palestinian Department of Antiquities and the École Biblique et Archéologique Française began in the Beach refugee camp in Gaza in 1995 when the Blakhiya Byzantine cemetery was discovered during planned construction works there. A rescue excavation followed in July 1996 to record the site ahead of the construction. Various artifacts dating back as far as 800 BCE include high walls, pottery, warehouses and mud-brick houses with colorful frescoed walls. Archaeologists believe the site may be Anthedon (Antidon), a major Hellenistic seaport on the Mediterranean which connected Asia and Africa to Europe.

==== Christian sites ====
The 5th-century Byzantine Church of Jabalia was discovered in 1996. The church was excavated along with its mosaics by the Palestinian Department of Antiquities after its discovery by labourers working on Salah al-Din Road in Gaza City. A 6th-century Byzantine church was discovered in 1999 by an Israeli archaeologist on the site of an IDF military installation in the northwestern tip of the Gaza Strip. The church contains three large and colorful mosaics with floral-motifs and geometric shapes. The most impressive of these is a multi-colored medallion at the entrance to the church. Inscribed therein is the name of the church, St. John (named for John the Baptist), the names of the mosaic's donors, Victor and Yohanan, and the date of the laying of the church's foundations (544 CE). Also found nearby were a Byzantine hot bath and artificial fishponds.

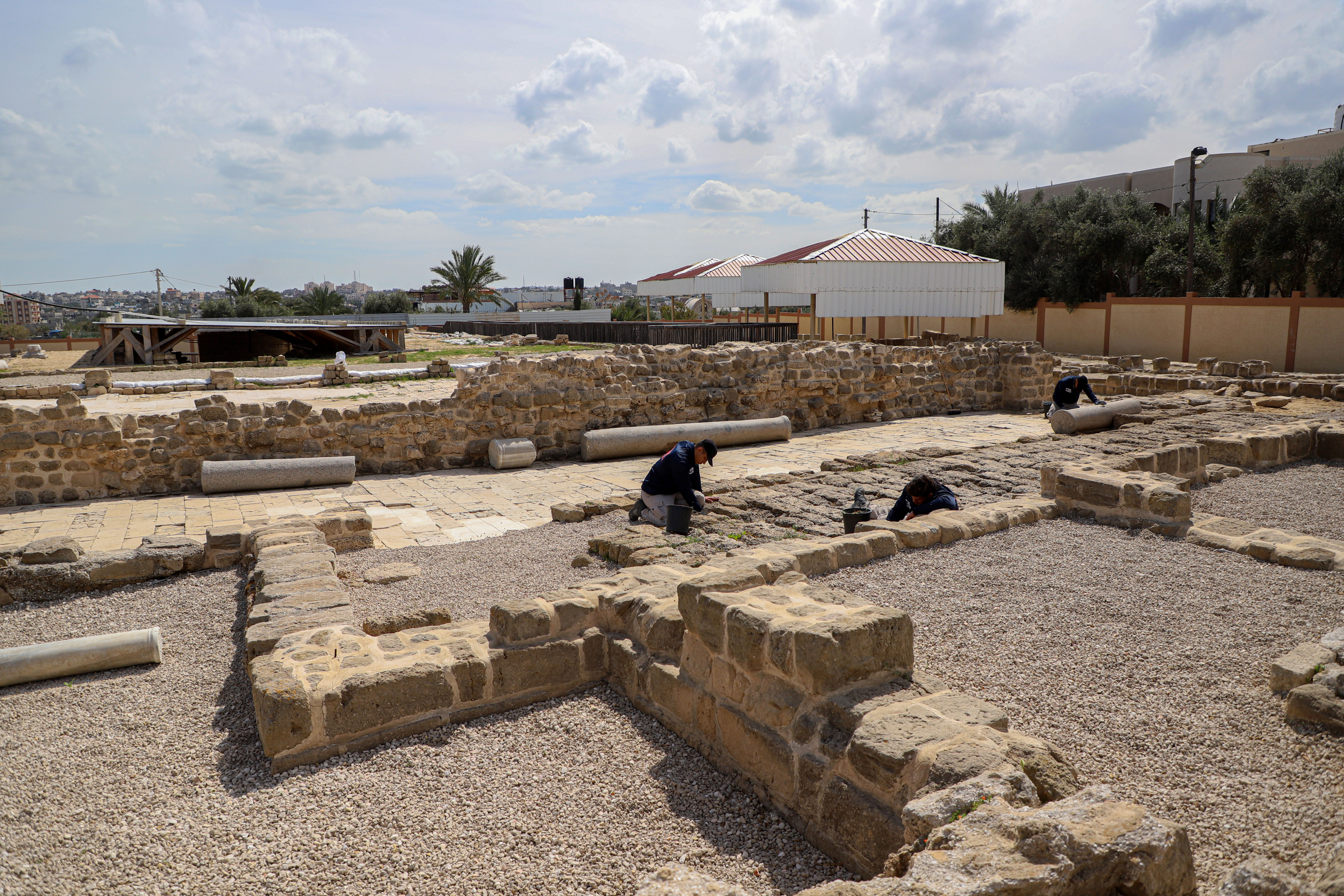
Tell Umm el-'Amr under excavation

Palestinian archaeologists have also discovered a number of sites of significance to Christianity. At Tell Umm el ‘Amer in 2001, a Byzantine-era mosaic was unearthed. Experts believe it forms part of the oldest monastic complex ever to be discovered in the Middle East, likely founded in the 3rd century by Saint Hilario. While the archaeologists working at the site are Muslim Palestinians, they see nothing unusual about their desire to protect and promote a Christian shrine in an area inhabited by only 3,500 Christians today. Yasser Matar, co-director of the dig, said "This is our history; this is our civilisation and we want our people to know about it. ... First we were Christians and later we became Muslims. These people were our forefathers: the ancient Palestinians." In 2001, Moain Sadeq, director general of the Department of Antiquities in Gaza, applied to the United Nations Educational, Scientific and Cultural Organization (UNESCO) to assign it World Heritage Site status and fund the site's protection, restoration and rehabilitation for visitors. In July 2024, UNESCO added the site to its World Heritage list and at the same time added it to its list of sites in danger during the Israeli invasion of the Gaza Strip.

==== Challenges posed by the Israeli–Palestinian conflict ====
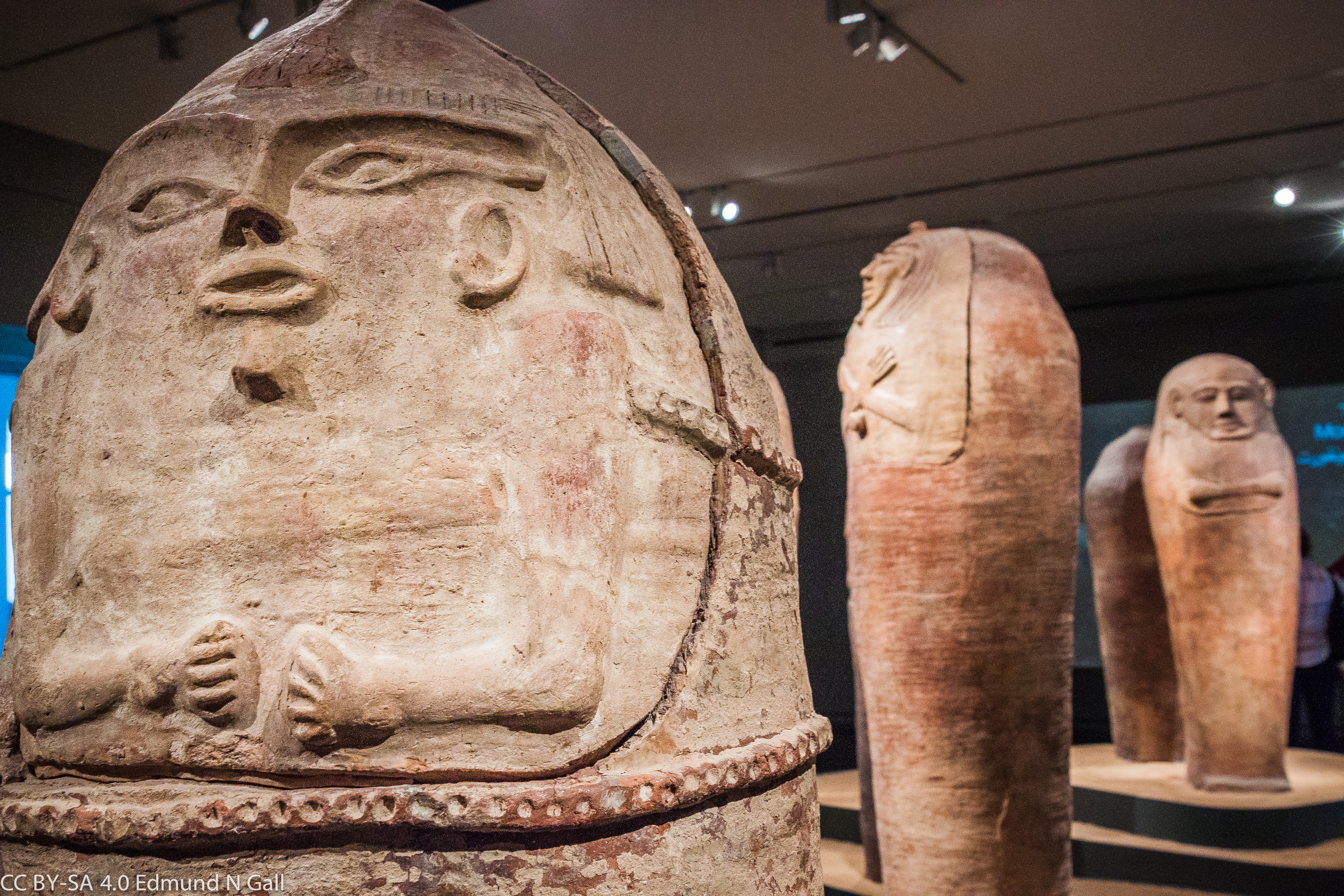
Some of the Bronze Age sarcophagi looted from Deir el-Balah in the aftermath of the Six Day War are on display at the Israel Museum in Jerusalem.

Following the Six Day War the Gaza Strip was occupied by the Israeli military. In the aftermath Moshe Dayan looted various sites, and retained artefacts in his personal collection such as Bronze Age sarcophagi from Deir el-Balah.

In 1974, the IAA removed a sixth-century Byzantine mosaic, dubbed 'King David Playing the Lyre', from the Gaza synagogue. The mosaic is now in the synagogue section of the Israel Museum. According to Jerusalem Post, it is illegal for an occupying power to remove ancient artifacts from the land it occupies, but Israel alleges that the Palestinians have not been able to safeguard antiquities in the areas under their control. Hananya Hizmi, deputy of Israel's Department of Antiquities in Judea and Samaria, explained, "Probably it was done to preserve the mosaic. Maybe there was an intention to return [the mosaic] and it didn't work out. I don't know why."

== Notable Palestinian archaeologists ==
- Dimitri Baramki
- Ayman Hassouna
- Mahmoud Hawari
- Khaled Nashef
- Moain Sadeq
- Hamdan Taha
- Fadel al-Utol
- Yusra
- Yasmin Zahran

== See also ==
- Archaeology of Israel
- Saved Treasures of Gaza: 5000 Years of History

== Bibliography ==
- Abu Alsaud, Louay (October 11, 2023). "Overlooked Archaeologists of Palestine". Palestine Exploration Fund.
- Abu Alsaud, Louay (2023b). "Contributions to the Archaeology of Palestine by Overlooked Twentieth-Century Palestinian Archaeologists, Yusra Al-Ḥaifawiyah, Naṣr Dwekat and Ibrahim Al-Fanni". Palestine Exploration Quarterly. 155, 2023 (4): 362–377. doi:10.1080/00310328.2023.2285582.
- Balter, Michael (2000). "Artifacts Prompt Tug-of-War". Science. 287 (5450): 33. doi:10.1126/science.287.5450.33b.
- Bohannon, John (21 April 2006). "Palestinian Archaeology Braces for a Storm". Science. 312 (5772): 352–353. doi:10.1126/science.312.5772.352b. PMID 16627711.
- Bunimovitz, Shlomo (March–April 1995). "How Mute Stones Speak: Interpreting What We Dig Up". Biblical Archaeology Review: 58–67. Archived from the original on 2024-04-12.
- Clarke, Joanne; Steel, Louise; Sadeq, Moain (2004), "Gaza Research Project: 1998 Survey of the Old City of Gaza", Levant, 36: 31, doi:10.1179/lev.2004.36.1.31
- Dever, William G. (2003). Who Were the Early Israelites and Where Did They Come from?. Wm. B. Eerdmans Publishing. ISBN 978-0-8028-0975-9.
- El Khoudary, Yasmeen (2019), "Gaza's historical cycles of prosperity and destruction: Is the present an aberration?", in Yacobi, Haim; Nasasra, Mansour (eds.), Routledge Handbook on Middle East Cities (1 ed.), Routledge, pp. 89–103, doi:10.4324/9781315625164-7, ISBN 978-1-315-62516-4
- Elter, René (2025). "Comment transmettre et sauver le patrimoine de Gaza?". In Bouffard, Élodie; Elter, René (eds.). Trésors sauvés de Gaza: 5 000 ans d'histoire (in French). Éditions el Viso. pp. 10–11. ISBN 9788412949469.
- Ezzughayyar, Ademar; Al-Zawahra, Muhammad; Salem, Hamed (5 January 1996). "Molluscan Fauna from Site 4 of Tell Jenin (Northern West Bank—Palestine)". Journal of Archaeological Science. 23 (1): 1–6. Bibcode:1996JArSc..23....1E. doi:10.1006/jasc.1996.0001.
- Fischer, Peter M.; Sadeq, Moain (2000). "Tell el-ʿAjjul 1999. A Joint Palestinian Swedish Field Project: First Season Preliminary Report". Egypt and the Levant. 10: 211–226. JSTOR 23783495.
- Henry, Roger (2003). Synchronized Chronology: Rethinking Middle East Antiquity. Algora Publishing. ISBN 0875861857.
- Humbert, Jean-Baptiste; Abu Hassuneh, Yasser; Hassuneh, Aymân; Abu Muhammar, Mahmud (2000). "Mukheitem à Jabaliyah, un site byzantin" [Mukheitem at Jabaliyah, a Byzantine site]. Gaza Méditerranéenne: Histoire et archéologie en Palestine (in French). Éditions Errance. pp. 121–126.
- Humbert, Jean-Baptiste; Sadeq, Moain (2000). "L'archéologie palestinienne de Gaza" [Palestinian archaeology in Gaza]. In Humbert, Jean-Baptiste (ed.). Gaza Méditerranéenne: Histoire et archéologie en Palestine (in French). Éditions Errance. pp. 15–17. ISBN 978-2-87772-196-7.
- Kletter, Raz (2003). "A very general archaeologist: Moshe Dayan and Israeli archaeology" (PDF). The Journal of Hebrew Scriptures. 4. doi:10.5508/jhs.2002.v4.a5. Archived from the original (PDF) on 3 December 2013.
- Lash, Mordechay; Goldstein, Yossi; Shai, Itzhaq (2020). "Underground – Archaeological Research in the West Bank, 1948–1967: Management, Complexity, and Israeli Involvement". Bulletin of the History of Archaeology. 30. doi:10.5334/bha-650.
- Leclant, Jean (1966). "Fouilles et travaux en Égypte et au Soudan, 1964–1965" [Excavations and works in Egypt and Sudan, 1964–1965]. Orientalia (in French). 35 (2): 127–178. JSTOR 43073935.
- Levy, Thomas Evan (1998). Archaeology of Society in the Holy Land. Continuum International Publishing Group. ISBN 978-0-8264-6996-0.
- de Miroschedji, Pierre; Sadeq, Moain (2000), "Tell es-Sakan, un site du Bronze ancien découvert dans la région de Gaza (information)", Comptes rendus des séances de l'Académie des Inscriptions et Belles-Lettres (in French), 144 (1): 127, doi:10.3406/crai.2000.16103
- de Miroschedji, Pierre; Sadeq, Moain (2008). "Sakan, Tell es-". The New Encyclopedia of Archaeological Excavations in the Holy Land. Vol. 5: Supplementary Volume. Israel Exploration Society/Biblical Archaeology Society (BAS). Archived from the original on 23 June 2024 – via BAS Library.
- de Miroschedji, Pierre; Sadeq, Moain; Faltings, Dina; Boulez, Virginie; Naggiar-Moliner, Laurence; Sykes, Naomi; Tengberg, Margareta (2001). "Les fouilles de Tell es-Sakan (Gaza): nouvelles données sur les contacts égypto-cananéens aux IVe-IIIe millénaires" [The excavations of Tell es-Sakan (Gaza): new data on Egyptian-Canaanite contacts in the 4th-3rd millennia]. Paléorient (in French). 27 (2): 75–104. doi:10.3406/paleo.2001.4732.
- Moorey, Peter Roger Stuart (1992). A Century of Biblical Archaeology. Westminster John Knox Press. ISBN 066425392X.
- Nabulsi, Abdalla J.; Humbert, Jean-Baptiste; Said, Ahmad; Sadeq, M. Moain (2010), "Excavation at the Blakhiya Byzantine cemetery in Gaza, 1996", Revue Biblique, 117 (4): 602–613, JSTOR 44091319
- Negev, Avraham; Gibson, Shimon (2001). Archaeological Encyclopedia of the Holy Land. Continuum International Publishing Group. ISBN 978-0-8264-8571-7.
- Phythian-Adams, W. J. (1922). "The Site of Ibleam". Palestine Exploration Quarterly. 54 (4): 142–147. doi:10.1179/peq.1922.54.4.142.
- Rast, Walter E (1992). Through the Ages in Palestinian Archaeology: An Introductory Handbook. Continuum International Publishing Group. ISBN 1563380552.
- Steel, Louise; Clarke, Joanne; Sadeq, Moain; Manley, Bill; McCarthy, Andrew; Munro, R. Neil (2004), "Gaza Research Project. Report on the 1999 and 2000 Seasons at al-Moghraqa", Levant, 36: 37, doi:10.1179/lev.2004.36.1.37
- Taha, Hamdan (August 2010). "The Current State of Archaeology in Palestine". Present Pasts. 2 (1): 16–25. doi:10.5334/pp.17.
- Taha, Hamdan; van der Kooij, Gerrit (2007). The Water Tunnel System at Khirbet Bal'ama. Ramallah, Palestine: The Department of Antiquities and Cultural Heritage, Ministry of Tourism and Antiquities. ISBN 978-9950-351-01-1.
