= Kitson Clark =

Kitson Clark is a surname. Notable people with the surname include:

- George Kitson Clark (1900-1975), English historian, brother of Mary
- Mary Kitson Clark (1905-2005), English archaeologist, sister of George
