= Yusra (archaeologist) =

Palestinian archaeologist

Yusra was a Palestinian woman who worked with Dorothy Garrod, the British archaeologist, at her excavations at Mount Carmel. Although very little is known of Yusra's life before or after, or even her full name, she was a prominent member of the excavation team between 1929 and 1935. Most notably, she is credited with the discovery of Tabun 1, a 120,000-year-old Neanderthal skull from Tabun Cave. She is the first known Palestinian archaeologist to have worked on a field excavation.

== Mount Carmel and discovery of Tabun 1 ==
It is assumed that Yusra was from either Ijzim or Jaba', in the Haifa region of what was then known as Mandatory Palestine. In 1929, British archaeologist Dorothy Garrod began excavating in the region around Mount Carmel and, following common practice at the time, she hired local workers from these villages to carry out the bulk of the work. Although not formally trained in archaeology, these workers were often skilled excavators with decades—sometimes generations—of experience. Unusually, Garrod hired large numbers of women to work on her excavations; more women than men. When Mary Kitson Clark visited the first season of excavations, she noted the 'feminist' work ethic at the site: men did menial tasks, whilst women did the skilled work of excavation and recording. Yusra was one of these women.

Yusra remained with Garrod throughout her excavations at Mount Carmel, from 1929 to 1935, working on important prehistoric sites such as Tabun, El Wad, Es Skhul, Shuqba and Kebara. She became "the most expert" of the women Garrod employed and was appointed foreman. She often worked alongside Jacquetta Hawkes, one of Garrod's students who went on to become a prominent archaeologist and writer.

One of Yusra's tasks required screening the excavated soil for artefacts before it was sieved. In 1932, whilst working at Tabun Cave, at Tabun 1, she found a tooth which was subsequently identified as part of a fragmented but mostly complete human skull. Once it was pieced together it was established that the skull was a female, adult Neanderthal who had lived between 120,000 and 50,000 years ago. It has been described Chris Stringer as "one of the most important human fossils ever found."

== Later life and legacy ==
Yusra shared with Hawkes, her ambition to study at Newnham College, Cambridge, where Garrod was a fellow, but this did not come to pass. It is not known what became of her once the excavations at Mount Carmel ended; both Izjim and Jaba' were depopulated during the 1948 Arab–Israeli War, frustrating attempts to trace her. What little is known of her life comes from the diaries of Mary Kitson Clark and the recollections of Hawkes, as well as papers of Garrod's that were rediscovered by researcher Pamela Jane Smith in 1996.

Yusra's discovery of Tabun 1 made a lasting contribution to science. Her story has been discussed as an example of a woman whose contribution to early archaeology went unacknowledged and largely forgotten since.
