= Ras El Kelb =

Cave in Lebanon

- location in Lebanon
- 33°55′7″N 35°35′9.9″E
- Periods: Paleolithic
- Cultures: Mousterian
- Location: 8 km (5 mi) from Beirut, Lebanon
- Part of: Settlement

History
- Built: c. 50,000 BC

Site notes
- Material: Limestone
- Excavation dates: 1959
- Archaeologists: Dorothy Garrod, G Henri-Martin,
- Public access: Yes

Ras El Kelb is a truncated seaside cave and Paleolithic settlement located on the low-lying (5 m (16 ft)) coast of Lebanon, 8 km (5.0 mi) north of Beirut. It is one of the oldest habitations found in the country.

Rescue excavations were carried out in 1959 by Dorothy Garrod and G. Henri-Martin. They dug 2 trenches named the 'Rail' and 'Tunnel' trenches, from which they recovered over 30,000 flint artefacts of a wide variety for statistical analysis from 22 geological layers. It was concluded that the sea had passed the level of the cave 3 times since its first dated habitation around 50,000 years BCE (52,000 years BP).

They also discovered a tooth suggested to belong to a Neanderthal. It was suggested that the inhabitants were expert at hunting gazelle using the flints recovered.
