= Wadi Natuf =

Seasonal stream in Palestine and Israel

Wadi Natuf; Nahal Natuf
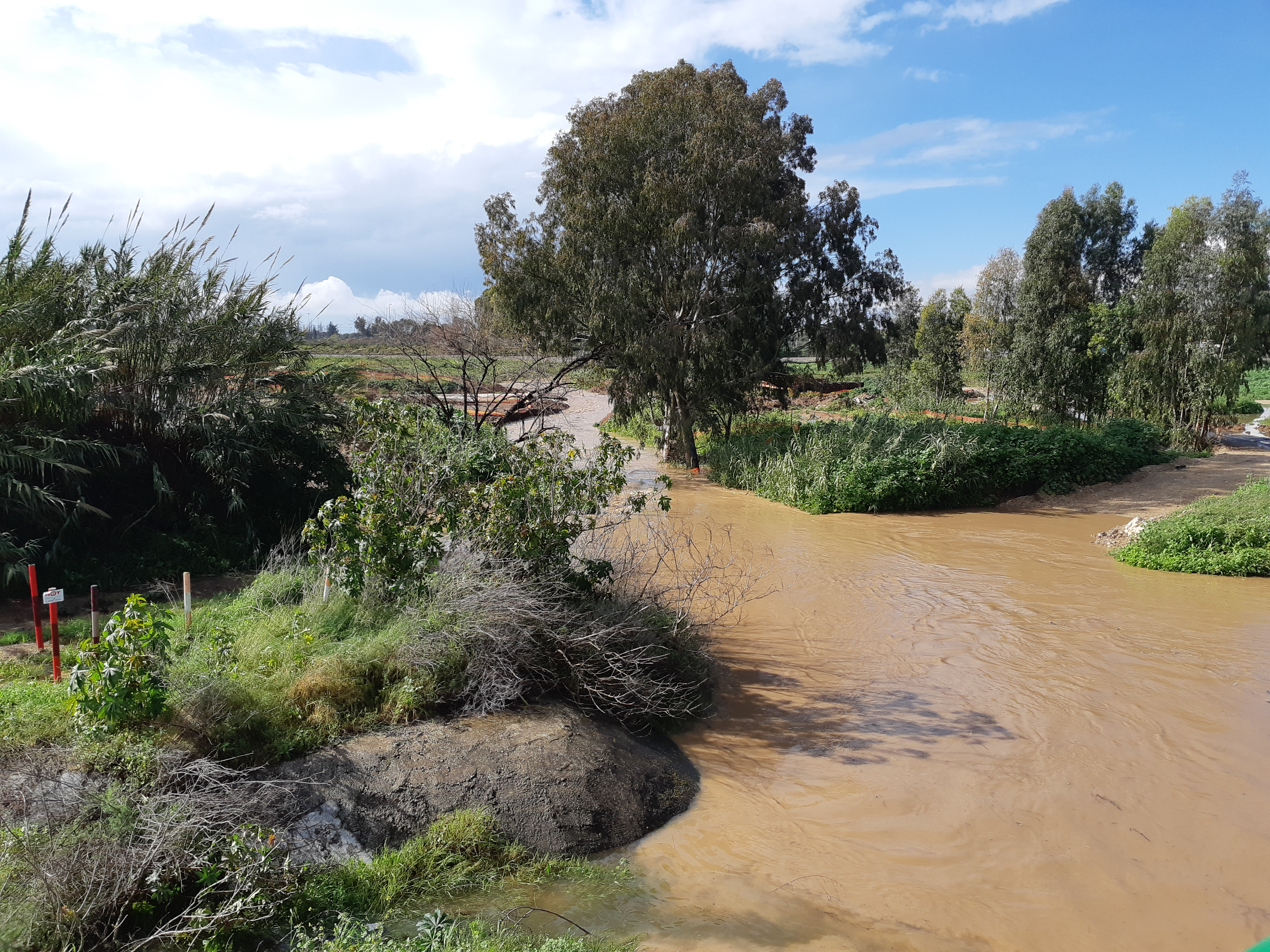
- Natuf Stream, filled by winter rains, as seen between Lod and the Ben Gurion Airport
- Native name: Wadi al-Natuf / Wadi en-Natuf (Arabic); Nahal Natuf (Hebrew)

Location
- Country: Palestine and Israel
- District: Ramallah and al-Bireh Governorate; Central District (Israel)

Physical characteristics
- Mouth: Ayalon River
  - location: Ben Gurion Airport, Israel

Wadi Natuf and Shuqba Cave
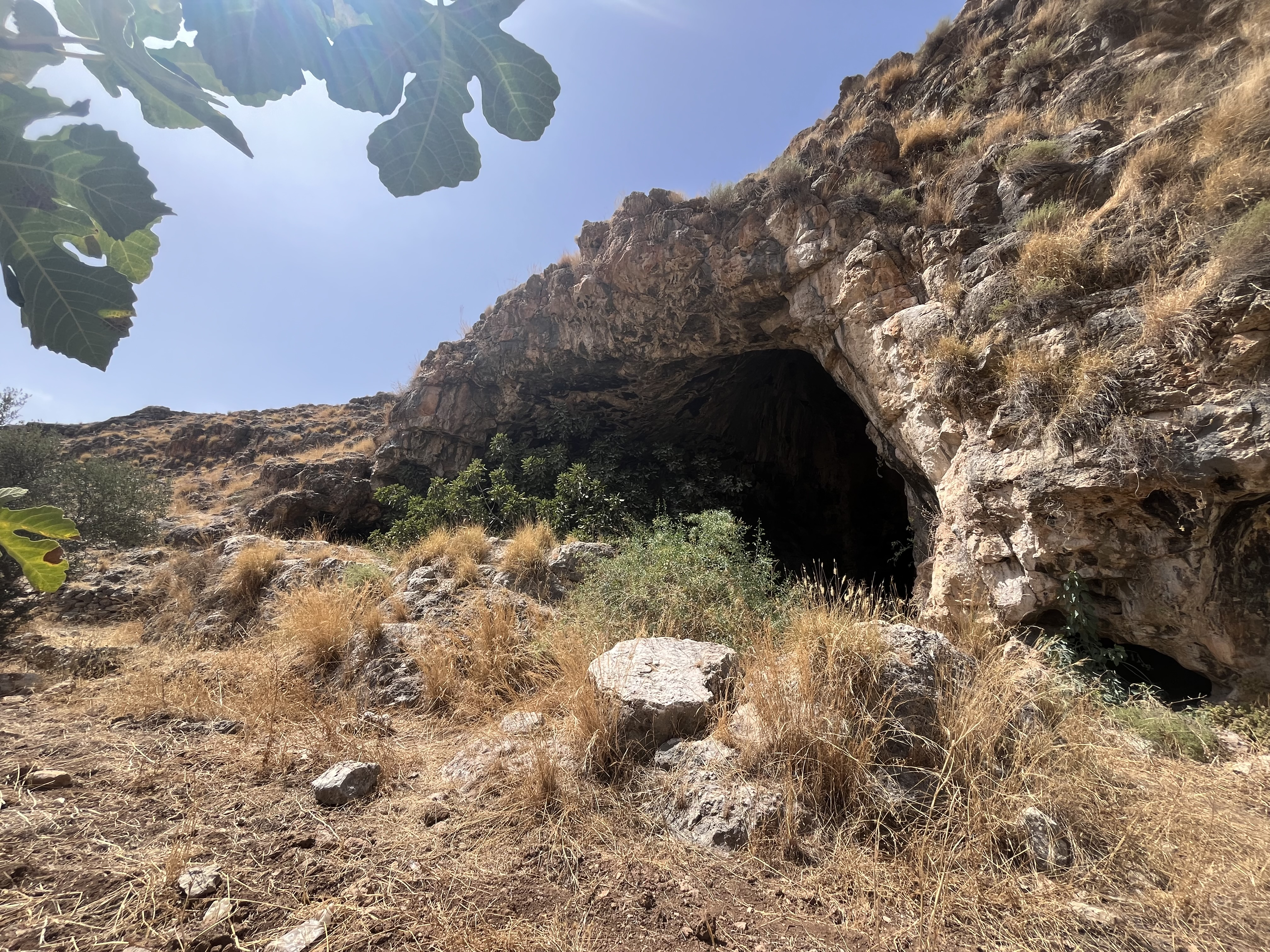
- Shuqba Cave entrance, 2024

- Location in the State of Palestine
- 31°58′55″N 35°02′37″E
- Cultures: Natufian culture
- Region: Ramallah and al-Bireh Governorate
- Grid position: 15420/15435 PAL

Site notes
- Archaeologists: Dorothy Garrod
- Public access: limited by West Bank barrier

Wadi Natuf (Arabic: وادي الناطوف, Wadi al-Natuf / Wadi en-Natuf) or Nahal Natuf (Hebrew: נחל נטוף) is a wadi (seasonal stream) in the West Bank and Israel, rising in the north of the Ramallah and al-Bireh Governorate of Palestine, crossing into Israel north of Modi'in and discharging into the Ayalon River at the Ben Gurion Airport.

The Natufian culture–an archaeological culture of the Epipaleolithic period in the Levant region–is named after the wadi. Along with the Shuqba Cave, which opens onto its northern bank, Wadi Natuf has been nominated as a tentative UNESCO World Heritage Site in the State of Palestine.
