= E. C. Clark =

British legal scholar (1835–1917)

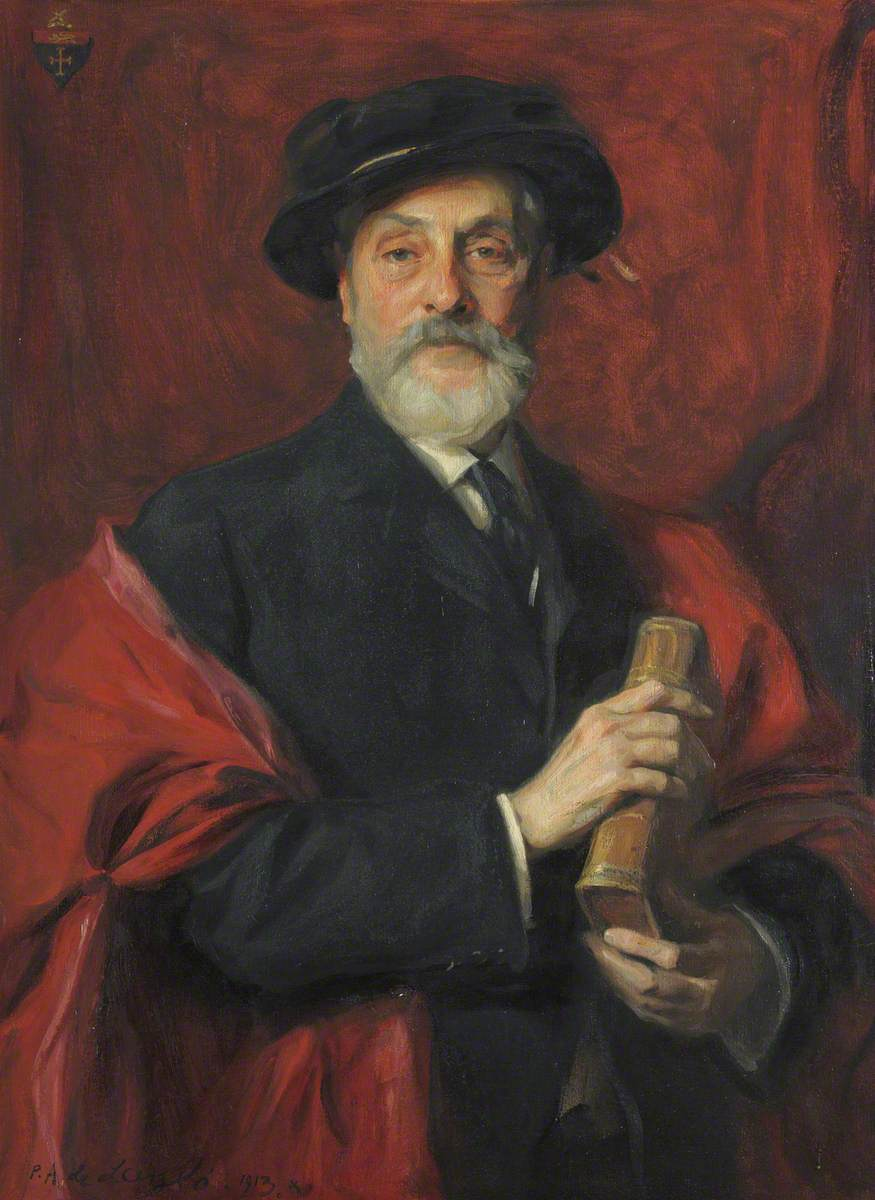
Portrait by Philip de László, 1913

Edwin Charles Clark (5 November 1835 – 20 July 1917) was a British legal scholar, barrister and antiquarian, who specialised in Roman Law. He was Regius Professor of Civil Law at the University of Cambridge from 1872 to 1914. He had been elected a Fellow of Trinity College, Cambridge in 1859 and then moved to St John's College, Cambridge in 1883 having been elected a professorial fellow. The author of a number of books, he wrote mainly for the benefit of his students (such as introductory texts), and his works "had little influence and are seldom cited" by jurists.

Clark was also an amateur antiquarian, with an interest in coins and archaeology, and published a number of related papers. He was elected a Fellow of the Society of Antiquaries of London (FSA), and also served as president of the Cambridge Archaeological Society.

== Personal life ==
Clark was born on 5 November 1835, and was the son of Edwin Clark of Ellinthorp Hall in Boroughbridge, Yorkshire, England. His mother and siblings died young, and so he was brought up with his father as his "sole companion".

On 17 June 1865, Clark married Mary Kitson: she was the daughter of James Kitson (1807–1885), a locomotive manufacture, and the sister of James Kitson (1835–1911), a politician and later Lord Airedale. He and Mary had two children: one daughter and a son, Edwin Kitson Clark (1866–1943), who was an engineer and British Army officer. Among his grandchildren were Mary Kitson Clark, an archaeologist, curator and independent scholar, and George Kitson Clark, a historian.

== Selected works ==
- Clark, E. C. (1872). Early Roman Law: The Regal Period. London: MacMillan.
- Clark, E. C. (1880). An analysis of criminal liability. Cambridge: Cambridge University Press.
- Clark, E. C. (1883). Practical jurisprudence: a comment on Austin. Cambridge: Cambridge University Press.
- Clark, E. C. (1906). History of Roman private law: Part I: Sources. Cambridge: Cambridge University Press.
- Clark, E. C. (1914). History of Roman private law: Part II: Jurisprudence. Cambridge: Cambridge University Press.
- Clark, E. C. (1919). History of Roman private law: Part III: Regal Period. Cambridge: Cambridge University Press.
