= Mary Kitson Clark =

English archaeologist (1905–2005)

Mary Kitson Clark FSA
- Kitson Clark in 1940
- Born: Anna Mary Hawthorn Kitson Clark; 14 May 1905; Leeds, England
- Died: 1 February 2005 (aged 99); Llangwnnadl, Wales
- Other name: Mary Chitty
- Occupations: Independent scholar; archaeologist; curator
- Spouse: Derwas Chitty (m. 1943; died 1971)

Scholarly background
- Education: Girton College, Cambridge

Scholarly work
- Discipline: Archaeology
- Sub-discipline: Roman Britain; Roman Archaeology; Natufian culture
- Institutions: Yorkshire Museum
- Notable works: A Gazetteer of Roman Remains in East Yorkshire (1935)

Anna Mary Hawthorn Kitson Clark, FSA (14 May 1905 – 1 February 2005), married name Mary Chitty, was an English archaeologist, curator, and independent scholar. She specialised in the archaeology of Romano-British Northern England but was also involved in excavations outside the United Kingdom and the Roman period. Her 1935 work, A Gazetteer of Roman Remains in East Yorkshire, "remains one of the starting points for any study of the Romans in the north of England".

== Early life and education ==
Kitson Clark was born on 14 May 1905 in Leeds, Yorkshire, England. She was the youngest of three children born to Edwin Kitson Clark (1866–1943) and Georgina Kitson Clark (née Bidder); an elder brother was the historian George Kitson Clark. Her paternal grandfather was Edwin Charles Clark, Regius Professor of Civil Law at Cambridge University, and her maternal great-grandfather was George Parker Bidder, an eminent engineer.

Kitson Clark was first educated at home and then at Leeds Girls' High School, a selective private school in Leeds. She then matriculated into Girton College, Cambridge to study the history tripos. After graduating with a Bachelor of Arts (BA) degree, she remained at the University of Cambridge to study for the one-year diploma in archaeology.

== Career ==
Kitson Clark belonged to the generation of amateur archaeologists who remained as independent scholars; over her lifetime she "witnessed the decline in influence of the amateur, independent scholar, and the rise of a professional class of archaeologist and historian". From 1929 to 1943, she was secretary of the Roman Antiquities Committee for Yorkshire; her father had been its treasurer. During this time, she published her magnum opus, A Gazetteer of Roman Remains in East Yorkshire (1935). It was described in 1990 as a "well-loved, well-thumbed classic", and according to her obituary in The Independent "remains one of the starting points for any study of the Romans in the north of England". From 1941 to 1943, she was also the curator of Roman Antiquities at the Yorkshire Museum in York.

After her marriage in 1943, Kitson Clark remained a member of the Yorkshire Philosophical Society (which, among other things, ran the Yorkshire Museum), becoming its longest-lived vice-president. After the death of her husband in 1971, she continued her research. She published a two-volume monograph on The Monks of Ynys Enlli (1992, 2000); the last volume was published just after her 95th birthday.

Kitson Clark was involved in a number of archaeological excavations. She excavated at a number sites in East Yorkshire, and published her findings in Gazetteer of Roman Remains in East Yorkshire (1935). In 1929, she went to Palestine and worked on the Dorothy Garrod led excavations of palaeolithic sites. In 1935, she was part of a team that excavated Petuaria, a Roman fort in Brough, East Riding of Yorkshire.

== Personal life ==
During her involvement in the 1929 excavations in Palestine, Kitson Clark met her future husband Derwas James Chitty (1901–1971); he was also an archaeologist and an Anglican priest. On 5 July 1943, she married Chitty. Together they had one child, a daughter. They then lived in Upton, Berkshire, where he served as its vicar. After he retired from full-time ministry in 1968, they lived in Llangwnnadl, Caernarfonshire, Wales. Her husband died in 1971 after a "domestic accident". In her obituary in The Independent it stated that after his death "Mary was much comforted by her strong Christian beliefs".

On 1 February 2005, Kitson Clark died at Môr Awel, Llangwnnadl, at the age of 99. Her funeral and a Requiem Mass were held at St Gwynhoedl's Church in Llangwnnadl on 5 February 2005.

== Honours ==
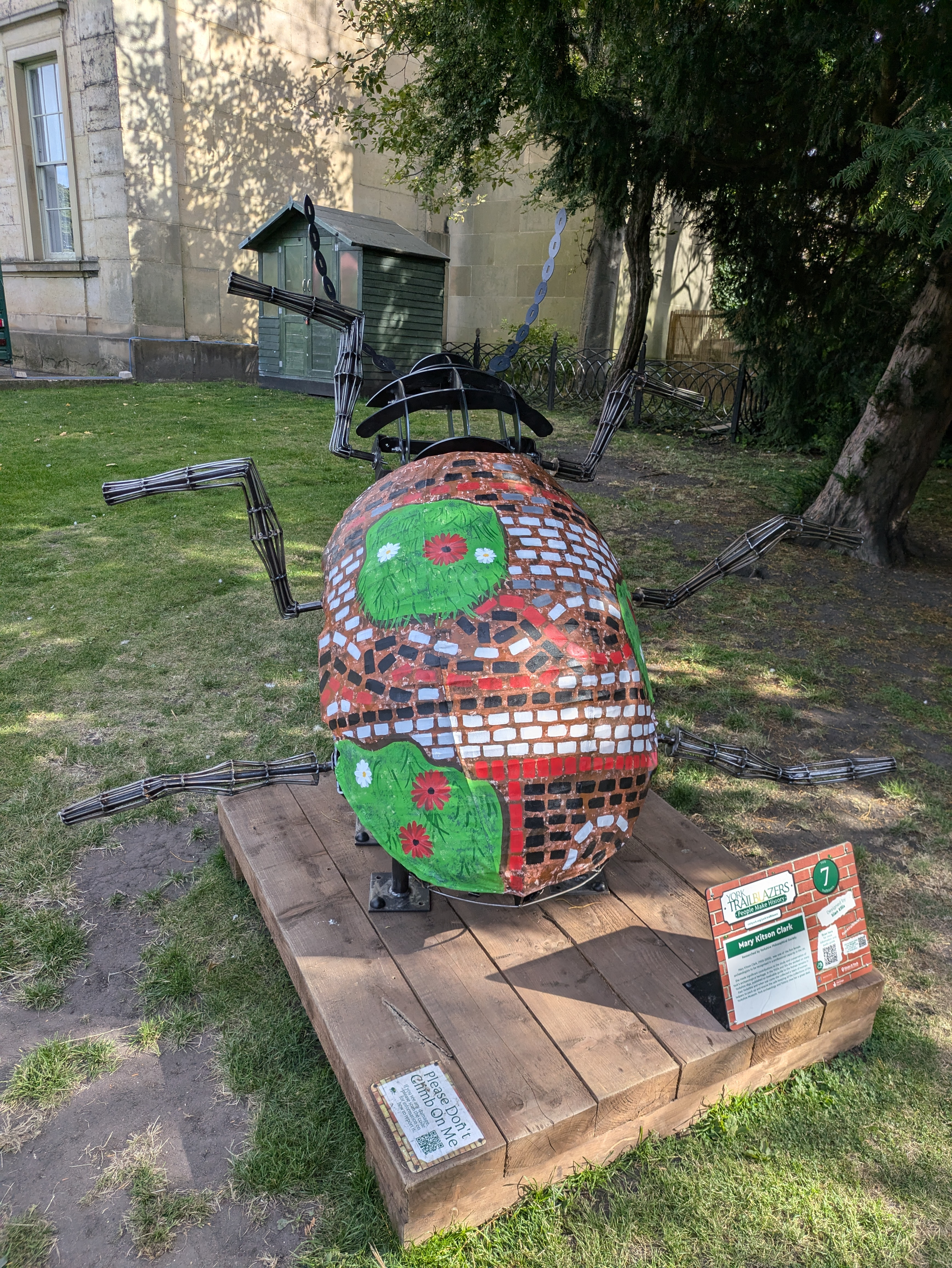
Tansy beetle sculpture commemorating Mary Kitson Clark as a trailblazer, in the Museum Gardens, York (2024)

On 13 January 1938, Kitson Clark was elected a Fellow of the Society of Antiquaries of London (FSA): at the time of her death she was the "last surviving fellow elected before the Second World War". In 1985, a conference was held in her honour by British Romanists; the proceedings of this conference were later published as Recent Research in Roman Yorkshire: studies in honour of Mary Kitson Clark (Mrs Derwas Chitty) (1988).

In 2024 Mary Kitson Clark was nominated by the Yorkshire Philosophical Society to be one of the "York Trailblazers". The trailblazers are celebrated by local artists responding to biographical information about leading figures in York's history, and presenting their artistic responses on a series of sculptures shaped like Tansy beetles around the city. Mary Kitson Clark's tansy beetle sculpture was installed in the York Museum Gardens, next to the Yorkshire Museum, and was designed by Sian Ellis.

== Selected works ==
- Kitson Clark, M. 1931. "Iron Age sites in the Vale of Pickering", Yorkshire Archaeological Journal. 30. 157–172.
- Kitson Clark, Mary (1935). A Gazetteer of Roman Remains in East Yorkshire. Leeds: Roman Antiquities Committee of the Yorkshire Archaeological Society.
- Kitson Clark, M. 1933. "Some Invasions of Yorkshire", Yorkshire Archaeological Journal 31. 320–330.
- Kiston Clark, M. 1939. "Where were the Brigantes", Yorkshire Archaeological Journal 34. 80–87.
- Myers, J. N. L, Steer, K. A., and Chitty, A. H. M. 1962. "The Defences of Isurium Brigantum (Alborough)", Yorkshire Archaeological Journal 40, 1–79.
- Chitty, Mary (1992). The Monks On Ynys Enlli: Part One c.500 AD to 1252 AD.
- Chitty, Mary (2000). The Monks On Ynys Enlli: Part Two 1252 AD to 1537 AD.
