= Hazar Merd Cave =

Group of Paleolithic cave sites excavated by Dorothy Garrod in 1928

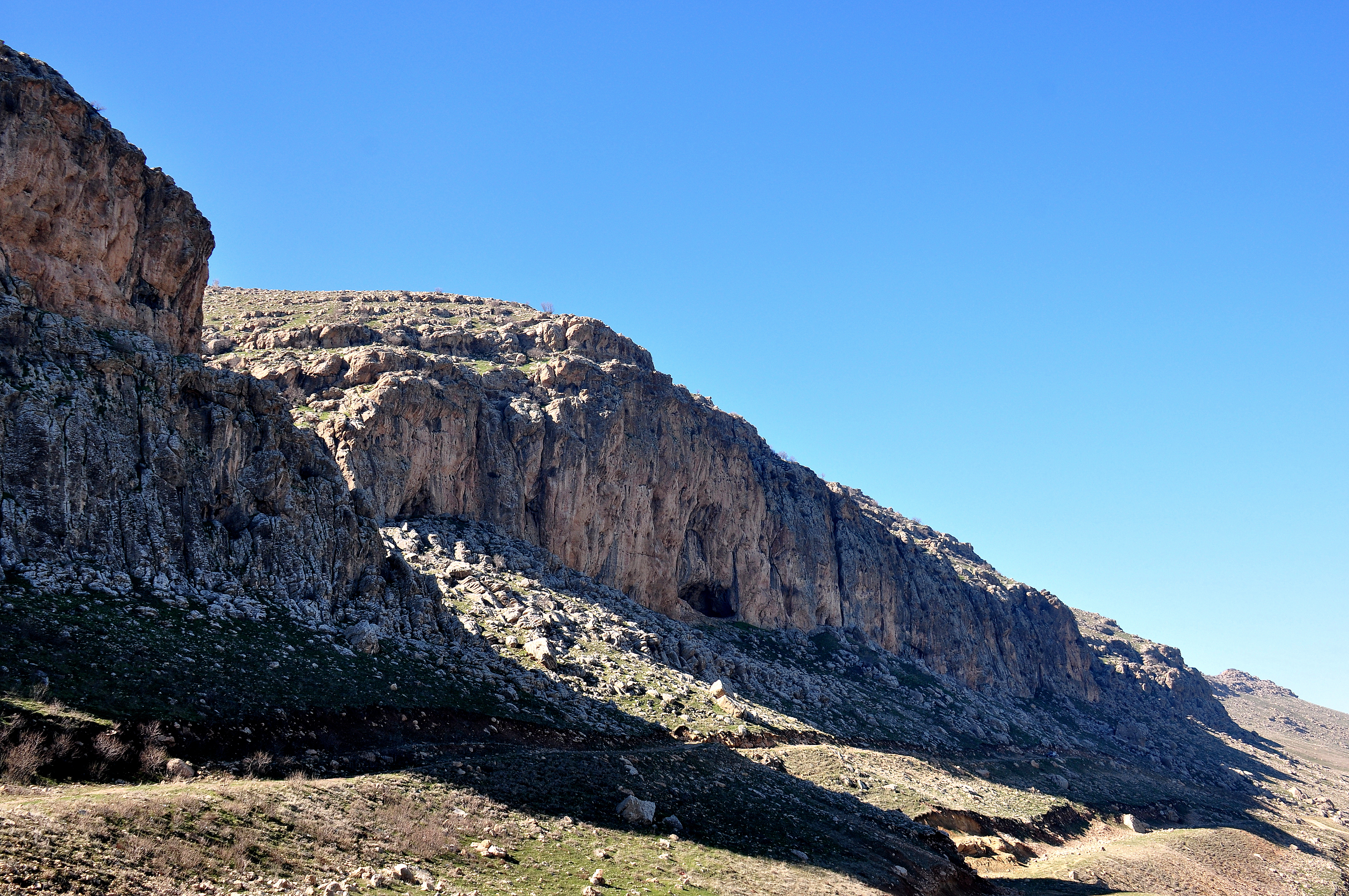
- Hazar Merd Caves

- location in Iraq
- 35°28′56″N 45°16′38″E
- Location: Southwest of Sulaymaniyah
- Region: Sulaymaniyah Governorate, Kurdistan Region, Iraq

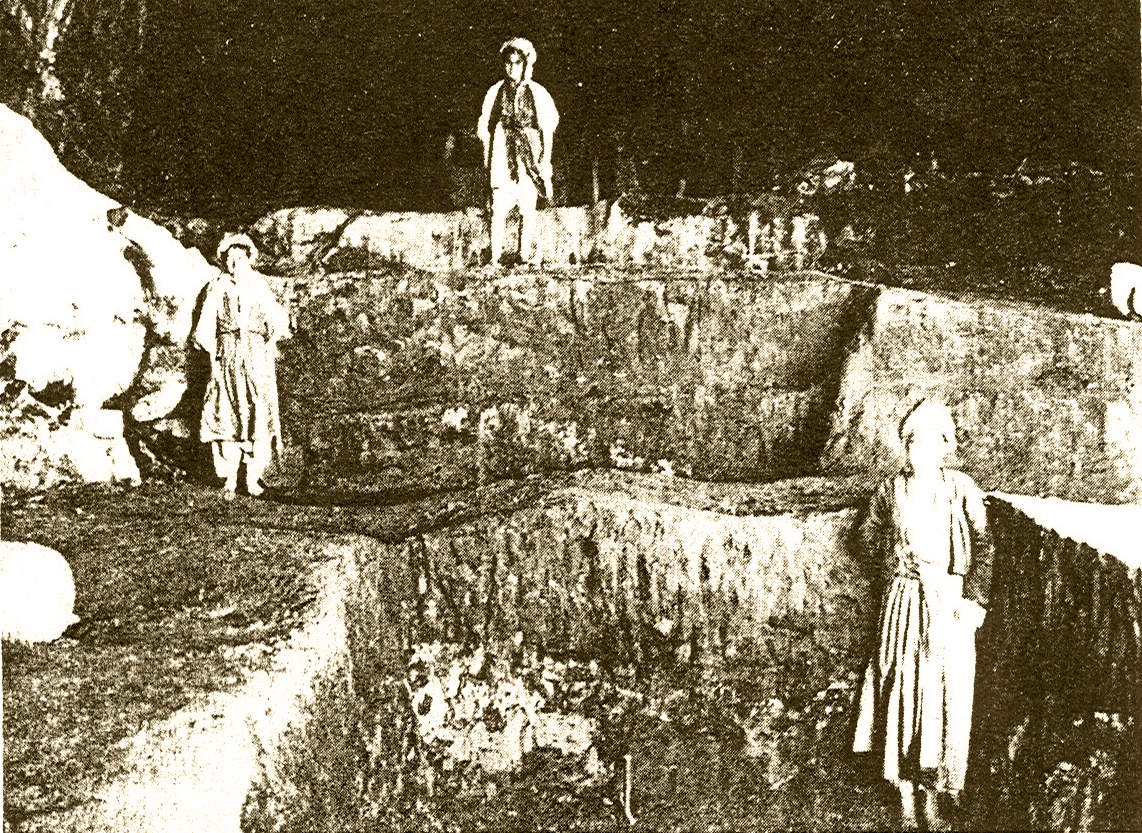
Hazar Merd 1928, three Kurdish boys standing on different levels of excavation trenches

Hazar Merd (in Kurdish: هەزارمێرد) (from Persian هزارمرد, meaning "A thousand Men") is a group of Paleolithic cave sites excavated by Dorothy Garrod in 1928. The caves are located southwest of Sulaymaniyah, in the Kurdistan Region, Iraq. Garrod's soundings in two caves in the Hazar Merd group provided evidence of Middle and Epi-Paleolithic occupation. It is referred to as Ashkawty Tarik in Kurdish, which means Dark Cave. It also has a commanding view over the valley and it's close to a small spring and a village with the same name.

Dark Cave has a single lofty chamber 11 by 12 m wide. The Mousterian layer, level C, is over 3 m thick, containing many hearths and burnt flints and bones. The stone tool assemblage, of flint and chert, is dominated by side scrapers and Mousterian points, with no evidence of the Levallois technique. In the lowest reaches of level C, but still within Mousterian layers, two hand axes were found. Side-scrapers slightly decrease in popularity towards the top of level C.

The faunal assemblage, although fragmentary, again shows a completely modern aspect, with bones from wild goat, red deer, gazelle, field mouse, mole rat, hare, bat, and several birds of woodland and scrub habitat. This evidence, and that from the presence of snails of the species Helix salomonica, indicates a mixed environment of woodland, grassland, and scrub, much as exists today. A small sounding in the adjacent Water Cave also revealed evidence of Mousterian occupation.

Garrod did not keep all the excavated material, and she only kept those pieces that were topologically informative. The remaining pieces were thrown away at the site.

Hazar Merd and Shanidar Cave are the only excavated Middle Palaeolithic sites in Iraqi Kurdistan.
