= Dorothy Garrod =

English archaeologist (1892–1968)

Dorothy Garrod CBE, FBA
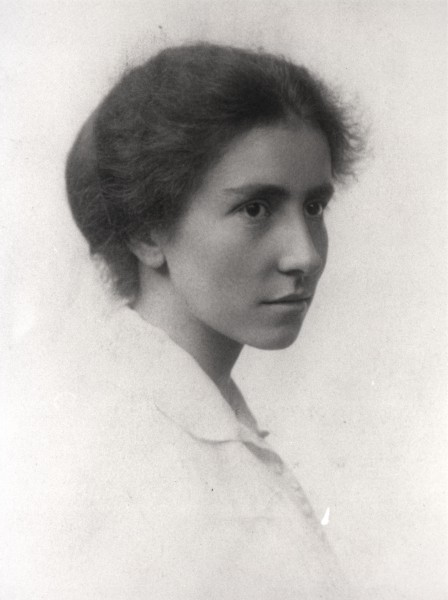
- Garrod whilst at Newnham College, Cambridge, c. 1913
- Born: Dorothy Annie Elizabeth Garrod; 5 May 1892; London, England
- Died: 18 December 1968 (aged 76); Cambridge, England
- Education: Newnham College, Cambridge; University of Oxford; Institut de paléontologie humaine
- Known for: The Upper Paleolithic of Britain; The Stone Age of Mount Carmel,
- Scientific career
- Fields: archaeology
- Workplaces: British School of Archaeology in Jerusalem; Newnham College, Cambridge

Dorothy Annie Elizabeth Garrod CBE, FBA (5 May 1892 – 18 December 1968) was an English archaeologist who specialised in the Palaeolithic period. Appointed as the Disney Professor of Archaeology from 1939 to 1952, Garrod was the first woman to hold a chair at the University of Cambridge.

== Early life and education ==
Garrod was born on 5 May 1892 at 9 Chandos Street, London to Sir Archibald Garrod, a physician, and Laura Elizabeth Garrod (née Smith). The maternal granddaughter of the surgeon Sir Thomas Smith, 1st Baronet, Garrod was the paternal granddaughter of the physician Sir Alfred Baring Garrod and niece of the zoologist Alfred Henry Garrod. The second of four siblings, Garrod was initially educated at home by governesses, including Isabel Fry and Constance Masefield. She later attended Birklands School in St Albans.

Enrolling at Newnham College, Cambridge in 1913, Garrod studied the Historical Tripos. The same year, Garrod converted to Catholicism. By the time of her graduation in 1916, Garrod's eldest brother, Alfred, and younger brother, Thomas, had died serving in First World War. Garrod's unofficial fiancé also died in the conflict, and her youngest brother, Basil, died in 1919 from influenza in Cologne prior to demobilisation. Briefly working at the Ministry of Munitions, Garrod served in the Catholic Women's League Huts in France and the Rhineland from 1917 to 1919. After being demobilised in 1919, Garrod went to Malta where her father, who served as the Head of War Hospitals, suggested she took interest in the island's prehistoric antiquities.

== Career ==
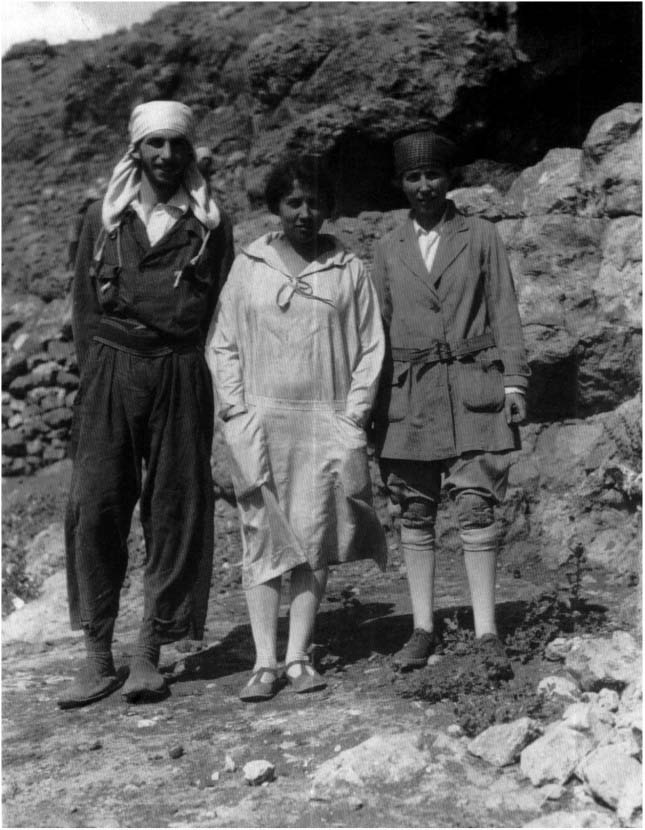
Garrod in 1928 standing with George and Edna Woodbury of the American School of Prehistoric Research

Following her father's appointment as the Regius Professor of Medicine at the University of Oxford, Garrod and her family settled in Oxford in 1920. The following year, Garrod began studying for the Oxford Diploma in anthropology under Robert Ranulph Marett. One among a small number of female students, the course provided Garrod with an intensive introduction to both archaeology and anthropology. Garrod later told Mary Kitson Clark during the 1929 excavation of Mount Carmel that Marett had inspired her to become a prehistorian of the palaeolithic.

Graduating with distinction in 1921, Garrod travelled to France on a travelling scholarship from Newnham College and carrying letters of introduction from Marrett. Meeting Henri Breuil at the house of Henri Begouën, Garrod visited the Cave of Niaux. Breuil agreed to take Garrod as his pupil at the Institut de paléontologie humaine in Paris, where she subsequently studied from 1922 to 1924. The historian Pamela Jane Smith argues that Garrod's interest in the origin, distribution and classification of Middle and Upper Palaeolithic assemblages; her fascination with the questions of the origin of the modern humans and the demise of the Neanderthals; the concern with relative dating by geochronology and her declaration that "Europe was only after all a peninsula of Africa and Asia" (Clarke 1999:409) could be interpreted as Garrod being the intellectual child of the Abbé Breuil".

In 1926, Garrod published her first academic work, The Upper Paleolithic of Britain, for which she was awarded a B.Sc. degree by the University of Oxford.

Following an invitation from Breuil, she investigated Devil's Tower Cave, a site over a period of seven months in Gibraltar between 1925 and 1927. It was only 350 metres from Forbes' Quarry, where a Neanderthal skull had been found earlier. Garrod discovered in this cave in 1925, a second important Neanderthal skull now called Gibraltar 2. It was her first internationally recognized excavation. Garrod was to find many anomalous skeletons during her ensuing career, but the skull did not fit within the definition of Neanderthal. In 1928, she led the first expedition to enter South Kurdistan. She was looking for evidence of Palaeolithic people migrating between Upper Mesopotamia and Syria. This work led to the test explorations of Hazar Merd Cave and Zarzi cave.

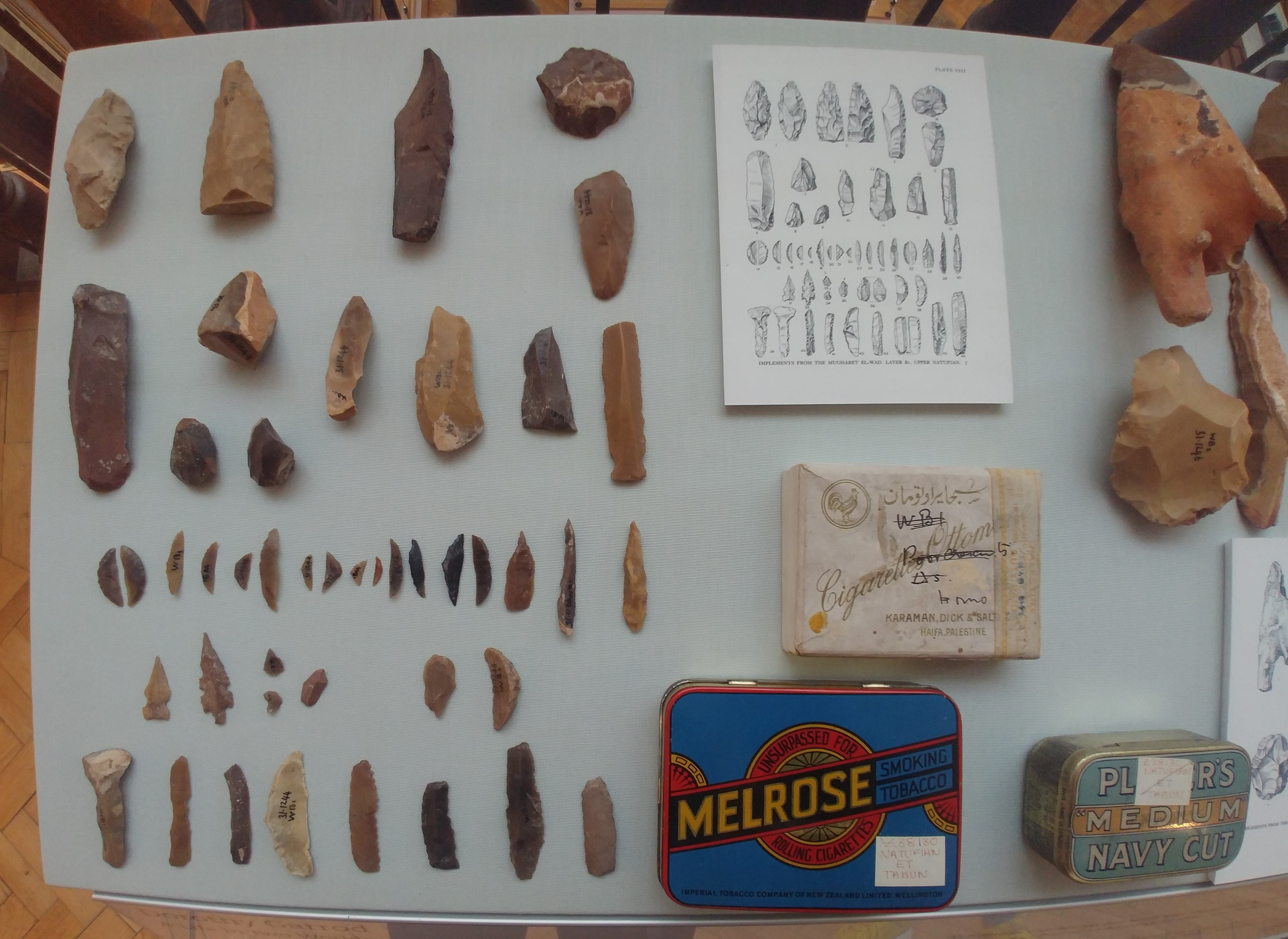
Display of material excavated by Dorothy Garrod, Museum of Archaeology & Anthropology, Cambridge, March 2022. Objects relate to Mount Carmel excavations.

In 1929, Garrod was appointed to direct excavations at Wadi el-Mughara at Mount Carmel in Mandatory Palestine, as a joint project of the American School of Prehistoric Research and the British School of Archaeology in Jerusalem. The series of 12 extensive fieldseasons was completed between 1929 and 1934. The results established a chronological framework that remains crucial to present understanding of that prehistoric period. Working closely with Dorothea Bate, she demonstrated a long sequence of Lower Palaeolithic, Middle Palaeolithic and Epipalaeolithic occupations in the caves of Tabun, El-Wad, Es-Skhul, Shuqba (Shuqbah) and Kebara Cave. She also coined the cultural label for the late Epipalaeolithic Natufian culture (from Wadi Natuf, the location of the Shuqba Cave) following her excavations at Es-Skhul and El-Wad. Her excavations at the cave sites in the Levant were conducted with almost exclusively women workers recruited from local villages, such as Jeba and Ljsim. One of these women, Yusra, is credited with the discovery of the Tabun 1 Neanderthal skull. (Note: According to Jacquetta Hawkes, Yusra acted as foreman in charge of picking out items before the excavated soil was sieved; over the years, she became expert in recognising bone, fauna, hominid and lithic remains and had spotted a tooth which led to the crushed skull. Hawkes remembered talking to Yusra about coming up to Cambridge. "She had a dream. She was very able indeed. Yusra would obviously have been a Newnham Fellow." The villages of Jeba and Ljsim were destroyed in 1948 and most members of the Palestinian team could not be traced.) In 1937, Garrod published The Stone Age of Mount Carmel, considered a ground-breaking work in the field. In 1938, she travelled to Bulgaria and excavated the Palaeolithic cave of Bacho Kiro.

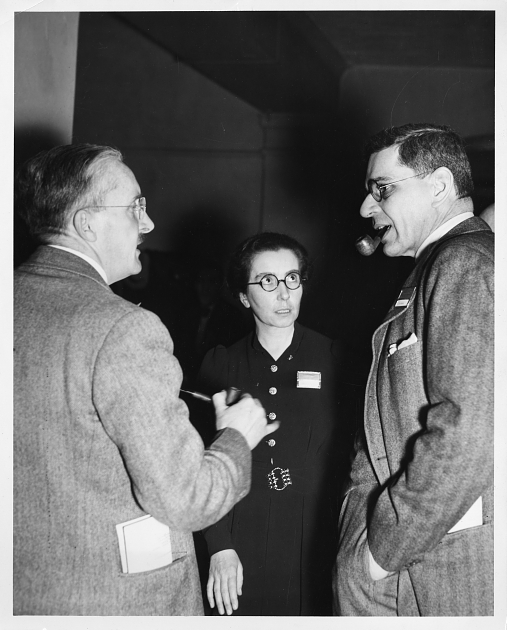
Garrod at the International Symposium on Early Man, Philadelphia, March 1937

After holding academic positions, including Newnham College's Director of Studies for Archaeology and Anthropology, she became the Disney Professor of Archaeology at Cambridge on 6 May 1939, a post she held until 1952. Her appointment was greeted with excitement by women students and a "college feast" was held in her honour at Newnham, in which every dish was named after an archaeological item. In addition, the Cambridge Review reported, "The election of a woman to the Disney Professorship of Archaeology is an immense step forward towards complete equality between men and women in the University." Gender equality at the University of Cambridge at the time was still remote: as a woman, Garrod could not be a full member of the university, so that she was excluded from speaking or voting on University matters. This continued to apply until 1948, when women became full members of the university.

From 1941 to 1945, Garrod took leave of absence from the university and served in the Women's Auxiliary Air Force (WAAF) during the Second World War. She was based at the RAF Medmenham photographic interpretation unit as a section officer (equivalent in rank to flying officer).

After the war, Garrod returned to her position and made changes to the department, including the introduction of a module of study on world prehistory. Where previously prehistory had been considered particularly French or European, Garrod expanded the subject to a global scale. Garrod also made changes to the structure of archaeology studies, so turning Cambridge into the first British university to offer undergraduate courses in prehistoric archaeology. During the university summer vacations, Garrod travelled to France and excavated at two important sites: Fontéchevade cave, with Germaine Henri-Martin, and Angles-sur-l'Anglin, with Suzanne de St. Mathurin.

=== Later life ===
On her retirement in 1952, Garrod moved to France, but continued to research and excavate. In 1958, aged 66, she excavated on the Aadloun headland in Lebanon, with the assistance of Diana Kirkbride. The following year she was asked urgently to excavate at Ras El Kelb, as a significant cave had been disturbed by road and rail construction. Henri-Martin and de St. Mathurin assisted Garrod for seven weeks, with the remaining material being removed to the National Museum of Beirut for more detailed study. She returned to Aadloun again in 1963, with a team of younger archaeologists, but her health began to fail and she was often absent from the sites.

Garrod appeared as a panellist in a 1959 episode of the game show Animal, Vegetable, Mineral? held at the Musée de l'Homme.

In the summer of 1968, Garrod had a stroke while visiting relatives in Cambridge. She died in a nursing home there on 18 December, aged 76.

=== Professorship ===
Garrod was the first female professor at Cambridge and was instrumental in changing it into an integrated institution. As a result of her election to Professorship, women were granted full membership, and allowed to graduate with degrees from the University of Cambridge. She worked mainly with women as she lived in a segregated English society. In Palestine she was treated as member of the British ruling class and deeply loved by Palestinians. Garrod's relationships with her Arab neighbours and employees "were warm. Garrod was often invited to weddings or other celebratory occasions. "She was called Sitt Miriam, Lady Mary.". Her Mount Carmel expedition crew, which covered all of the excavations (Skhul, Kebara, el-Wad and et-Tabun), consisted mostly of local Arab women. Garrod was in complete charge of the many long-term excavations at Mount Carmel. In 1931, Francis Turville Petre, an openly gay man, participated very briefly in her excavations of Mount Carmel as part of Garrod's team at Skhul. Francis Turville-Petre had discovered an ancient cranium at Mugharet ex-Zuttiyeh, near the Sea of Galilee, considered to be the most remarkable prehistoric archaeological event of the 1920s in Western Asia.

=== Awards and recognition ===
In 1937, Garrod was awarded Honorary Doctorates from the University of Pennsylvania and Boston College and a DSc. from the University of Oxford. She was elected a Fellow of the British Academy in 1952, and in 1965 she was awarded the CBE. She felt it was important that archaeologists travel and therefore left money to found the Dorothy Garrod Travel Fund. In 1968, the Society of Antiquaries of London presented her with its gold medal.

From September 2011 to January 2012, 17 photographs of Garrod's of excavations, friends and mentors were displayed in 'A Pioneer of Prehistory, Dorothy Garrod and the Caves of Mount Carmel' at the Pitt Rivers Museum.

In 2017, Newnham College announced that a new college building will be named after Garrod. In 2019, the McDonald Institute for Archaeological Research at the University of Cambridge unveiled a new portrait of Garrod by artist Sara Levelle.

== See also ==
- Archaeology of Israel

== Notes ==
Academic offices
Preceded by Sir Ellis Minns	Disney Professor of Archaeology, Cambridge University; 1939–1952	Succeeded by Sir Grahame Clark
