= Shuqba Cave =

Cave and archaeological site in Palestine

Shuqba cave
- Location in the West Bank, Palestine
- 31°58′55″N 35°02′37″E
- Cultures: Natufian culture
- Region: Judaean Mountains
- Grid position: 15420/15435 PAL

Site notes
- Archaeologists: Dorothy Garrod

Shuqba Cave is an archaeological site in Wadi Natuf near the town of Shuqba in the West Bank, Ramallah and al-Bireh Governorate, Palestine. The cave is the type-site for the prehistoric Natufian culture.

In 2013, the cave and the valley it opens into, Wadi Natuf, were added to UNESCO's tentative list for possible designation as a World Heritage Site.

== Location ==
Shuqba cave is located on the northern bank of Wadi en-Natuf, at a point where the wadi passes a kilometer south of the town of Shuqba, and later runs in a general northwesterly direction towards the Israeli coastal plain. The town is 28 km northwest of Jerusalem. This area is within the Judaean Mountains.

== Archaeology ==
The site was briefly investigated in 1924 by Father Alexis Mallon, who suggested that the British School of Archaeology in Jerusalem take responsibility for excavating the cave. During the course of one season Dorothy Garrod, with a team of local workers, placed a trench in the central chamber, as well as a small sounding in Chamber III. She identified an archaeological sequence which included a Late Levallois-Mousterian layer. It also included a Mesolithic layer that she subsequently named "Natufian". This was the first time that a Natufian layer had been found as part of a stratified deposit. This layer contained charcoal traces and a previously unknown microlithic stone tool industry characterized by crescent-shaped lunates. Garrod's team found worked bone objects. The fauna was dominated by gazelle, and also included the domestic dog. The remains of 45 human skeletons, mostly fragmentary, allowed insights into a range of distinctive mortuary practices.

Recent investigations have identified what are believed to be Neanderthal remains, together with Nubian Levallois knapping tools previously thought to be specific to Homo sapiens. A recently reexamined fossilised tooth found by D. Garrod in the cave, is the southernmost evidence of Neanderthals ever discovered, raising the possibility that this hominin species originally coming from Eurasia might indeed have reached Africa while fleeing from the advancing northern glacial climate.

== Wadi Natuf sites ==
Shuqba cave falls within the broader prehistoric landscape of the Wadi en-Natuf. While most of the lithic material in the immediate (1 km) survey area along the wadi's north bank is concentrated around the cave, debitage has been found at a small natural terrace 200 m south of the cave. Surface collection suggests that this material derives from the cave and from the 1928 spoil, the bulk of which has been washed down the slope. A terrace is visible today, but it was constructed as part of modern agricultural practices.

== UNESCO registration; recent threats ==
In 2013, the area was added to UNESCO's tentative list for possible designation as a World Heritage Site.

The Wadi en-Natuf and Shuqba Cave came since 2000 under threat due to road building, decay, lack of protection, and extensive garbage dumping. The Israeli authorities have built a bypass road through Wadi en-Natuf to connect the Israeli settlements of the Modi'in Illit-Nili bloc. They have also built an exit ramp from the bypass to allow garbage trucks to dump trash in the valley. A security wall was also built, which makes access to the cave from the Palestinian side more difficult and from the Israeli side impossible.

== Bibliography ==
- Finkelstein, I.; Lederman, Zvi, eds. (1997). Highlands of many cultures. Tel Aviv: Institute of Archaeology of Tel Aviv University Publications Section. ISBN 965-440-007-3. (p. 196)
