= George Kitson Clark =

- Born: 14 June 1900; Leeds, Yorkshire, England
- Died: 8 December 1975 (aged 75); Cambridge, England
- Relatives: Mary Kitson Clark (sister)

Academic background
- Education: Shrewsbury School
- Alma mater: Trinity College, Cambridge

Academic work
- Discipline: Historian
- Sub-discipline: 19th century; historiography; Repeal of the Corn Laws
- School or tradition: Historical revisionism
- Institutions: Trinity College, Cambridge; Faculty of History, University of Cambridge

George Sidney Roberts Kitson Clark (14 June 1900 – 8 December 1975) was an English historian, specialising in the nineteenth century. He was a fellow of Trinity College, Cambridge from 1922 to 1975, and additionally held the title of Reader in Constitutional History in the Faculty of History, University of Cambridge between 1954 and 1967.

== Early life and education ==
George Kitson Clark born on born on 14 June 1900 in Leeds, Yorkshire, England. He was the son of the engineer Edwin Kitson Clark (1866-1943) who began his engineering training with a three year pupilage which he served at the Airedale Foundry of Messrs. Kitson from 1888-1891, later becoming a partner and chairman of the firm. George's sister was Mary Kitson Clark. His paternal grandfather was E. C. Clark, Regius Professor of Civil Law at the University of Cambridge. While growing up, he lived in Meanwood, a village to the north of Leeds that would be one of its suburbs.

George Kitson Clark was educated at Shrewsbury School, then an all-boys public school (i.e. an independent boarding school) in Shrewsbury, Shropshire. In 1919, he matriculated into Trinity College, Cambridge to study the Historical Tripos, having been awarded an exhibition. He achieved a lower second class in Part I of the Tripos, and graduated with a Bachelor of Arts (BA) degree in 1921 having achieved first class honours in Part II.

== Academic career ==
He lived the life of a bachelor don as a fellow of Trinity College, Cambridge, his alma mater, from 1922 to 1975. He became a research fellow of his college in 1922 and a college lecturer in 1928. He was additionally a lecturer in the Faculty of History, University of Cambridge from 1929 and was Reader in Constitutional History from 1954 to 1967. He was disappointed never to hold a university professorial chair or to reach the senior leadership of his college.

He is known as a revisionist historian of the Repeal of the Corn Laws. G. D. H. Cole identified a "Kitson Clark" school of historians revising the assessment of the Anti-Corn Law League and the Chartists. He delivered the Ford Lectures in 1959–60, speaking on "The Making of Victorian England".

Jack Plumb, who disliked Kitson Clark, describes him as a reformer of the History Tripos and obstacle to Lewis Namier, with various swipes. He served as chair of the Faculty Board of History from 1956 to 1958. Although he was a conservative in most of his views, he "played a prominent part" in enlarging the Historical Tripos syllabus to include American history and the history of the British Empire.

In 1975, he was elected as a foreign honorary member of the American Academy of Arts and Sciences. He died the same year, on 8 December 1975 at his college in Cambridge.

== Selected works ==
- Peel and the Conservative Party: a Study in Party Politics, 1832–41 (1929; 1st ed.)
- Guide for Research Students Working on Historical Subjects (1958)
- Making of Victorian England (1962)
- Peel and the Conservative Party (1964; 2nd ed.)
- An Expanding Society: Britain 1830–1900 (1967)
- The Critical Historian (1967)
- Churchmen and the Condition of England 1832–1885 (1973)
- Portrait of an Age (1977) editor
