= Yasmin Zahran =

Palestinian archeologist and novelist (born 1933)

- Born: 1933 (age 92–93); Ramallah, Mandate for Palestine
- Education: Columbia University; University of London; Sorbonne University
- Occupation: Archeologist
- Writing career
- Period: 1990s
- Genre: Novel
- Notable work: A Beggar at Damascus Gate

Yasmin Zahran (Arabic: ياسمين زهران, romanized: Yāsamīn Zahrān; born 1933) is a Palestinian writer and archeologist who is known for her novels, including A Beggar at Damascus Gate.

== Early life and education ==
Zahran was born in Ramallah in 1933. She graduated from Columbia University and the University of London. She received a PhD in archaeology from Sorbonne University in Paris.

== Career and activities ==
Following her graduation Zahran was employed in the UNESCO. Then she worked at the Postgraduate Institute of Archaeology in Jerusalem. She is the cofounder of the Jerusalem-based Institute of Islamic Archaeology which was established in 1992. Zahran's studies focus on the leading historical figures in the Middle East such as Zenobia which she described as a multi-ethnic queen.

Zahran is a resident of both Paris and Ramallah.

=== Books ===
Zahran published her first novel, The First Melody, in 1991 which was published in Arabic. Her second book, A Beggar at Damascus Gate, which was written in English was published in 1993 and narrates the struggle of Palestinians to find a place which they could call home. This novel largely reflects Zahran's own experience.

Her other books include Philip the Arab: A Study in Prejudice, Zenobia Between Reality and Legend, Ghassan Resurrected and Septimius Severus: Countdown to Death. She wrote a book about cats entitled The Golden Tail in 2017.
