= St Gwynhoydl's Church, Llangwnnadl =

St Gwynhoydl's Church
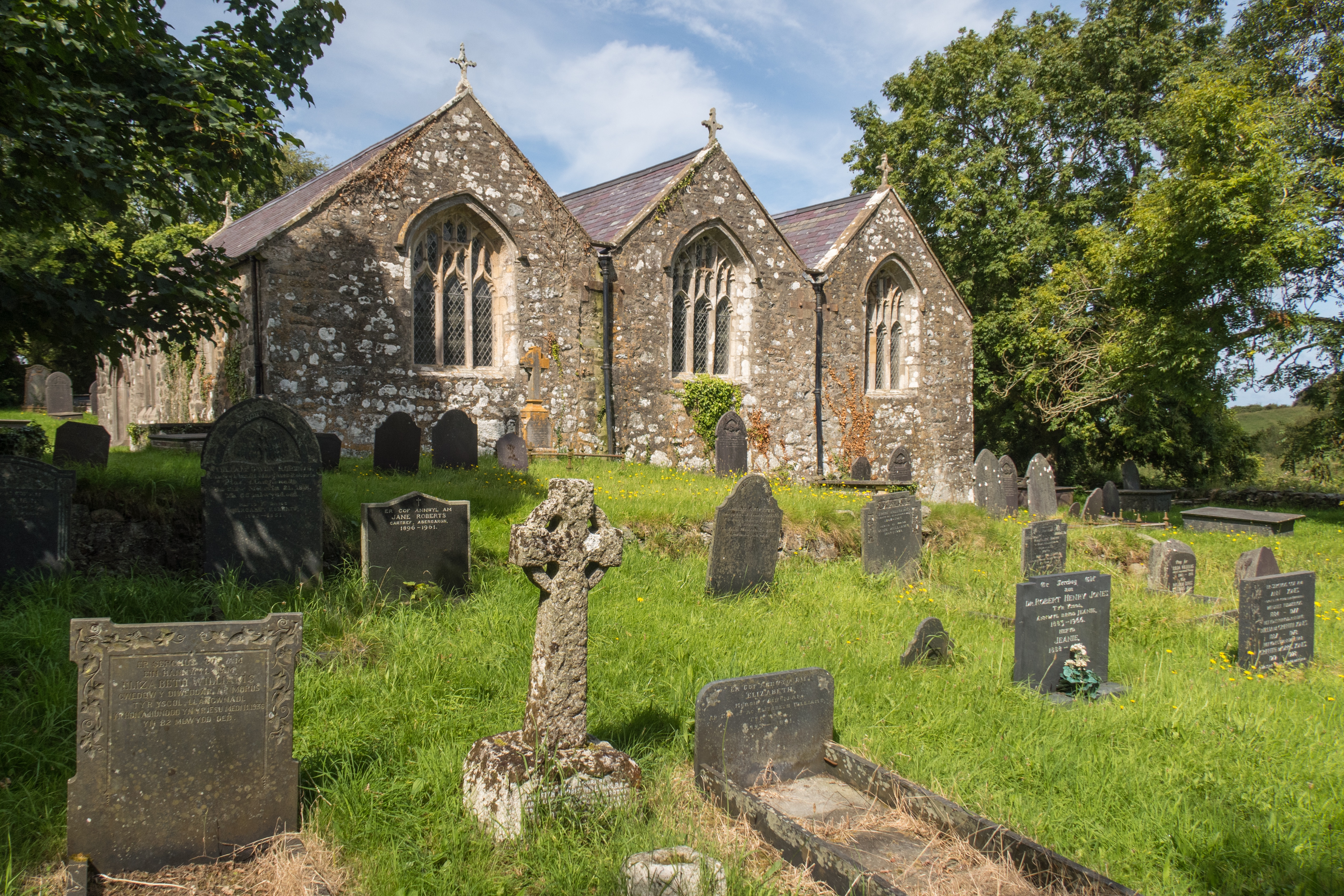
- The church's "extraordinary" three-nave plan

- Location in Gwynedd
- 52.8667°N 4.6624°W
- Location: Llangwnnadl, Gwynedd
- Country: Wales
- Denomination: Church in Wales

History
- Status: Parish church
- Founder: Gwynhoydl
- Dedication: Gwynhoydl

Architecture
- Functional status: Active
- Heritage designation: Grade I
- Designated: 19 October 1971

Administration
- Diocese: Bangor
- Archdeaconry: Meirionnydd
- Benefice: Synod Meirionnydd
- Parish: Bro Madryn

St Gwynhoydl's Church is located just north-west of the village of Llangwnnadl, Gwynedd, Wales. The church is dedicated to Gwynhoydl, a 6th-century Welsh saint. The church dates to the 14th or 15th centuries, and was greatly extended in the 16th. It is a Grade I listed building.

== Background ==
The village of Llangwnnadl stands 45 km (28 mi) south-east of Caernarfon on the northern coast of the Llŷn Peninsula. The church stands just north of the village and is dedicated to Gwynhoydl, a 6th-century Welsh saint. Also spelt Gwynhoedl, he was held to be a son of the legendary figure Seithennin in the genealogical tract Bonedd y Saint, and his feast day is said to have been on 1 January. The church dates from the 14th or 15th centuries, with the additional of the two aisles dating from 1520 to 1530. The church was on the pilgrimage route to St Mary's Abbey on Bardsey Island. It was restored in 1850 by Henry Kennedy, architect to the Diocese of Bangor.

The church remains an active parish church in the Diocese of Bangor and occasional services are held.

== Architecture and description ==
Richard Haslam, Julian Orbach and Adam Voelcker, in their Gwynedd volume of the Buildings of Wales series, record the church's "extraordinary plan – three naves of equal length, the overall width greater than the length". Such a design is rare. The central nave and chancel are combined with a bellcote above. The building material is local rubble, and slate for the roof. Arcades in the interior carry two inscribed panels, one of the Latin inscriptions recording the burial of Saint Gwynhoydl at the site. The church is a Grade I listed building.

== Gallery ==
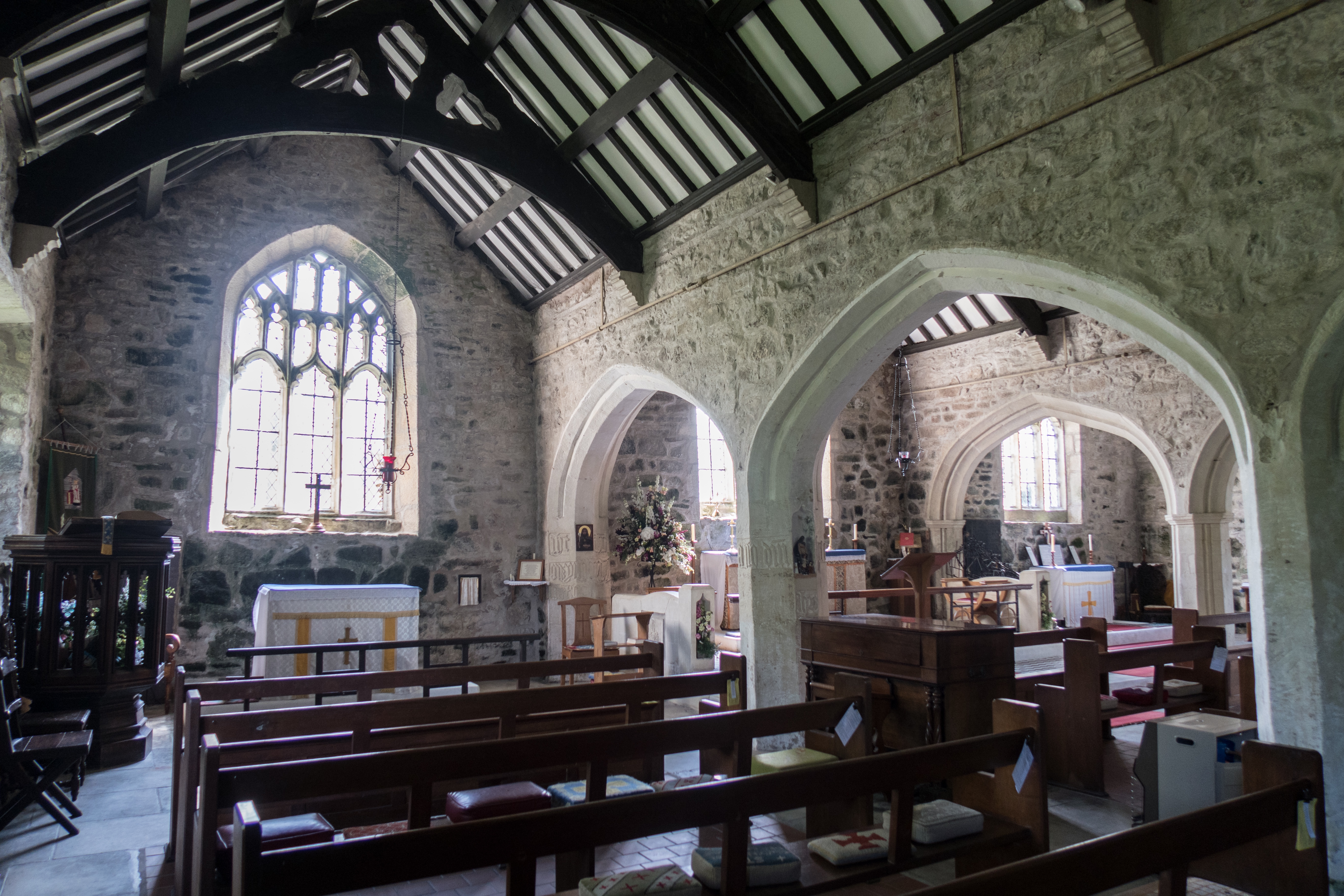
Interior

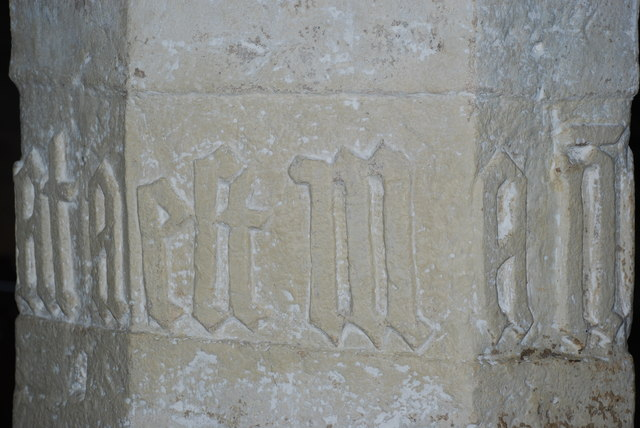
Inscription in Latin recording the burial of Saint Gwynhoydl at the site

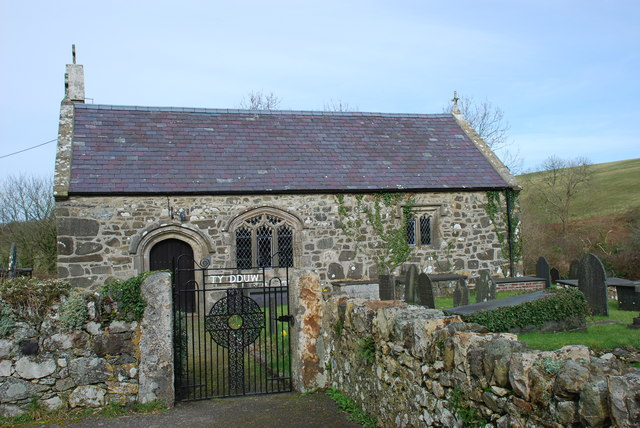
The entrance front

== Sources ==
- Bartrum, P. C. (1993). A Welsh Classical Dictionary: People in History and Legend up to about A.D. 1000. Aberystwyth: National Library of Wales.
- Haslam, Richard; Orbach, Julian; Voelcker, Adam (2009). Gwynedd. The Buildings of Wales. New Haven and London: Yale University Press. ISBN 978-0-300-14169-6. OCLC 1023292902.
