= Fontéchevade =

Cave and archaeological site in France

Fontéchevade Cave
- Grotte de Fontéchevade
- Fontéchevade
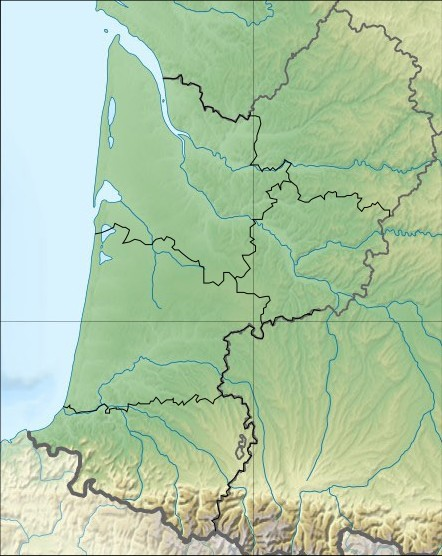
- location in France Fontéchevade (France) Fontéchevade (Europe)
- 45°40′6.27343″N 0°28′47″E
- Type: Cave
- Periods: Lower Paleolithic
- Associated with: Paleo-humans
- Location: Charente department, in Nouvelle-Aquitaine

Site notes
- Material: limestone Karst

Fontéchevade is a cave in Charente, France, which contains Palaeolithic remains from 200,000 and 120,000 years ago. The fossils consist of two skull fragments. Unlike Neanderthals and Homo sapiens of the time, the frontal skull fragment lacks any development of a brow ridge. This feature led French paleoanthropologists of the time to propose the "pre-sapiens" theory, in which the line to modern humans was said to have branched off before the appearance of the Neanderthals. Subsequent research has cast doubt on the importance of the Fontéchevade evidence.

One of the fossils may be from an immature individual or from a period of time later than its surrounding deposits. The other does not preserve the brow area, but other aspects of its morphology are similar to those seen in Neanderthals.

== See also ==
- Kaolin deposits of the Charentes Basin
- Lascaux
