= Debra Sparrow =

Musqueam weaver, artist and knowledge keeper

Debra Sparrow, or θəliχʷəlʷət (Thelliawhatlwit), is a Musqueam weaver, artist and knowledge keeper. She is self-taught in Salish design, weaving, and jewellery making.

== Biography ==
Sparrow was born and raised on the Musqueam Indian Reserve, part of the traditional territories of the Musqueam people, in Vancouver, British Columbia. Sparrow credits her grandfather, Ed Sparrow, who lived to be 100 years old and remembered the forcible removal of the Musqueam people from Stanley Park, with giving her "300 years of stories" that grounded her in her heritage and enabled her to hear the voices of her ancestors. "We never stopped dancing, we never stopped singing, we never stopped practising our cultural ways," says Sparrow, who considers herself a person who lives and practises traditional ways.

Sparrow is the mother of three grown children.

== Musqueam weavers ==
By the time of Sparrow's childhood the techniques of Salish weaving were lost to the Musqueam nation. There were no living weavers to teach a new generation; the last known weaver before the revival was Sparrow's great-grandmother. In 1985, Wendy John, Sparrow's eldest sister attended a Salish weaving course at the Vancouver Indian Centre (now the Vancouver Aboriginal Friendship Centre). The next year, Sparrow and her younger sister Robyn Sparrow began to study weaving as well.

Along with her sister Robyn, Sparrow co-founded a group of women weavers in the 1980s who rejuvenated the Salish Weaving tradition. They were able to reconstruct the lost weaving techniques utilizing an anthropological book by Paula Gustafson and by examining blankets handed down in their family and in museums in BC, Washington and New York. Says Sparrow of the weaving process: "And when I stand – in front of my loom and I'm working and creating, I'm with them, I'm not here anymore. I'm back in time and I'm thinking of the women and they're whispering to me and guiding me". Although the weavers are not able to access the dog hair originally utilized by Salish weavers, due to the extinction of the animals, sheep's wool, often hand spun, has made the transition into the weaving technique. The weaving is time intensive: "Robes take longer to weave than totem poles take to carve".

== Educating others ==
Sparrow is active in the education community at various levels. She has designed programs and taught elementary aged children about Musqueam culture and history, through the UBC Museum of Anthropology. She teaches Salish weaving techniques to children, teenagers and adults: taught at Birkland Brothers Wool Shop, through the Urban Weavers project, through MOA and the Vancouver School Board.

Sparrow gives demonstrations and public talks at venues such as the Greater Vancouver Weavers and Spinners Guild and the Bill Reid Gallery. She also participates in presentations and publications with national and international symposia and conferences in regards to indigenous modern and traditional art, such as UNESCO and the European Textile Network.

Sparrow has been an instructor at Langara College during their Fall and Winter 2018/19 semesters teaching a Reconciliation Weaving course as a continuation of the college's previous Reconciliation Carving series instructed by Squamish artist Aaron Nelson-Moody.

She has collaborated as a lead artist and a mentor for the Vancouver Arts Colloquium Society's Weaving Our Way, a collaborative intercultural weaving project, funded by the 2017 City of Vancouver Cultural Arts Grants. The collaborative blanket has been showcased at the various sites, including Richmond Art Gallery, UBC, and the Roundhouse Community Centre. The collaborative blanket is now a public collection of the City of Vancouver and permanently displayed at the Dunbar Community Centre.

== Major works ==
Sparrow's work is sought by private and public collections including the University of British Columbia, Heard Museum in Phoenix, Arizona; the Canadian Museum of History in Hull, Quebec; the Royal B.C. Museum in Victoria; Paramount Studios in Los Angeles; and the Burke Museum of Natural History and Culture in Seattle, WA.

In 1996, Sparrow and her sister Robyn wove two blankets of four in the "Out of the Silence" installation at the Vancouver International Airport. The four weavings are made from hand-dyed, hand spun sheep's wool and measure 4.9 x 1.5 meters each. The other artists are Krista Point, Gina Grant and Helen Calbreath. The weavings are part of the Musqueam Welcome Area of the International Arrivals area, the official welcoming area to Canada, British Columbia and Vancouver for all international flights, along with carvings by Susan Point of Welcoming Figures and Flight (Spinning Whorl). One of the blankets woven by Debra and Robyn is titled Sulsila, which translates as "The Grandparents," and was reproduced by the Kanata Blanket Company.

Other designs of Sparrow's are reproduced by the Kanata Blanket Company in their Licensed Artist Designs line.

In 2009, Sparrow was commissioned to create a ceremonial blanket and shawl for the First Nations gallery at Government House in Victoria, BC.

Sparrow designed the logo for the Canadian Hockey Teams for the 2010 Olympic and Paralympic Winter Games in Vancouver, BC. The maple leaf shaped logo features a collage of Salish and Canadian symbols drawn by Sparrow including thunderbird, eagle, beaver, moose, hockey sticks, fleur de lis, Orcas, hockey players and maple leaves. Sparrow worked in conjunction with Stuart Iwasaki, graphic designer for Nike, Inc.

For the 2010 Olympic Games, Debra and Robyn Sparrow created two weavings, Thunderbirds: Keepers of the Sky, which hang in UBC Thunderbird Arena. These are permanent pieces that remain in the venue as a legacy of the Games.

Sparrow was part of the design team that created the Queen of the Night costume in Vancouver Opera's Coastal Salish inspired production of The Magic Flute in 2013. She was also commissioned by Disney to create regalia for the movie White Fang II.

In 2015, Sparrow, in conjunction with Vancouver-based company Peau de Loup, designed the Unity Scarf for the 2015 FIFA Women's World Cup. The Unity Scarf was a double-sided printed with a Salish design on one side and the word Canada on the other. Sparrow said ""I am honoured to share these intricate designs with Peau de Loup for the National Women's team so that the world has an opportunity to see the relationship between all the people in Canada… I hold my hands up to all Women Athletes who have come to compete at the world level… Welcome!" of the work and the accomplishments of women athletes.

In 2018, Sparrow undertook several mural projects across the city of Vancouver. In collaboration with the Vancouver Mural Festival, Sparrow will be designing a three part mural series titled "Blanketing the City" incorporating contemporary Coast Salish design elements, focusing on geometric blanket weaving patterns. The first Mural in the series was unveiled as the centrepiece of the VMF Art Smash event on Granville Island. The mural is a wrap around design over two cement pillars underneath the Granville Street Bridge. '"Blanketing the City Pt. II" is located in the Mount Pleasant neighbourhood and the third mural is in collaboration with Capilano University and Sto:lo artist Carrielynn Victor as a part of the schools 50th anniversary celebrations. As a part of the 2018 SKOOKUM music festival, Sparrow contributed a pop up mural installation as a part of the festivals "SKOOKUM After Dark" events.

== Publications by Debra Sparrow ==
- Musqueam Museum School Programme; Sparrow, Debra; Point, Rose; Baird, Jill Rachel; Musqueam Indian Band; University of British Columbia; Museum of Anthropology (2002). Musqueam Museum School: the academics of art and culture, teaching and resource guide. Vancouver: UBC Museum of Anthropology. OCLC 606952634.
- Weaving Worlds Together by Debra Sparrow and Jill Baird, presented at the Symposium on "Indigenous Identities: Oral, Written Expressions and New Technologies." UNESCO, 2001.
- "Know who you are, Know where you come from" in A Hurricane in the Basement. City of Vancouver, 2000.
- Sparrow, Debra (1998). "A Journey". In Bachmann, Ingrid; Scheuing, Ruth (eds.). Material Matters: The Art and Culture of Contemporary Textiles. Toronto: YYZ Books. OCLC 948713036.
- Topographies: Aspects of Recent B.C. Art. Vancouver Art Gallery. 1996. OCLC 948713170.
- "Out of the Silence" in European Textile Network December 1994, pp 43–45.
- 1995–1997 Debra Sparrow Weaving Two Worlds Together School Programme at the UBC Museum of Anthropology Vancouver

== Awards ==
BC Creative Achievement Award for First Nations' Art, 2008
