= Coast Salish art =

Art style of the Coast Salish peoples

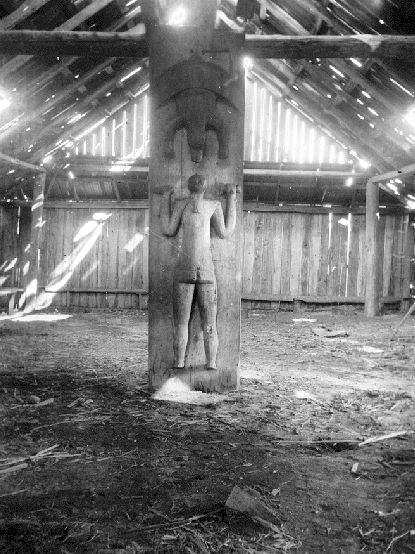
Photograph of a Musqueam (xʷməθkʷəy̓əm) house post.

Coast Salish art is an art unique to the Pacific Northwest Coast among the Coast Salish peoples. Coast Salish are peoples from the Pacific Northwest Coast made up of many different languages and cultural characteristics. Coast Salish territory covers the coast of British Columbia and Washington state. Within traditional Coast Salish art there are two major forms; the flat design and carving, and basketry and weaving. In historical times these were delineated among male and female roles in the community with men made "figurative pieces, such as sculptures and paintings that depicts crest, shamanic beings, and spirits, whereas women produced baskets and textiles, most often decorated with abstract designs."

== History ==
The settlement of non-natives in this region was one of the first for the Pacific Northwest Coast which brought early cultural disruptions much sooner and faster than most of the coast. This made it so a limited quantity of ancient artifacts of the art form were produced, especially compared to amount that exists about other Northwest Coastal art.

The Coast Salish lived in shed-roofed longhouses, large dwellings made from cedar planks and beams, with large extended families living within the house. Platforms around on the inside stood 3 or 4 feet above ground against the wall and were used as sleeping areas. Sometimes large beams on the sides of the longhouse called "House Posts" would be carved or painted depicting ancestors, family history, or supernatural beings. Some longhouses grew to enormous sizes such as one Simon Fraser described in his visit with Sto:lo people with a house measuring 640 feet long and 60 feet wide or another Squamish longhouse measuring 200 feet long by 60 feet wide where 11 families lived in the house, numbering around 100 people.

Among Coast Salish in the central region, the sxwayxwey (Sx̱wáýx̱way or Skwayskway in other languages) mask ceremony is an important part of the culture. Men from families who have the hereditary right to be initiated into the sxwayxwey society and wear the mask, and perform dance with the addition of women singers and a special song. The masks themselves have budged out cylindrical eyeballs, "horns" represented by animal heads, and drooping tongues with large feathers creating a dynamic crown. They are accompanied by special regalia covered with feathers and leggings with hoof rattles attached.

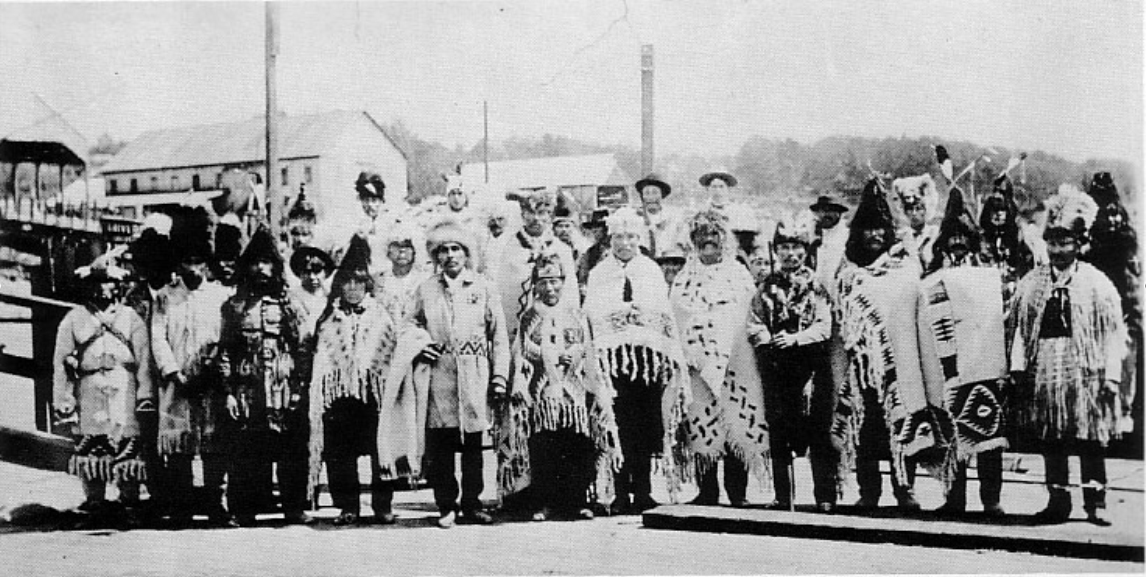
Squamish leaders in 1903 are wearing traditional mountain-goat wool blankets. These blankets show the different designs and patterns woven.

Wool from the mountain goat and Salish Woolly Dog, now extinct, were used to craft wool woven mats, blankets, clothing, and robes. The wool would be taken from the animals and then mixed with a diatomaceous earth removing oils and adding a white colour. After wetting, the wool would be twisted between the palm and thigh to create a loose strand, after which was spun. Whorls were placed on the shafts of wood spindles, and the loose strands of wool were spun. Some of the circular spindle whorls were plain, but others had elaborate designs and beings depicted.

Here a Musqueam (xʷməθkʷəy̓əm) elder woman, C’elicia, is spinning wool on spindle-whorl c. 1915

Blankets, mats, and robes were woven on looms which were made up of two upright bars and were attached to two horizontal rollers. Some loom poles were also carved with figures illustrating supernatural characters or family history. Specially designed combs were used during the process of preparing the wool, and another tool pushed the weft during weaving. Although the smaller textiles were often functional, many larger robes served as indicators of wealth.

Men carved house posts, grave monuments, masks, and ritual paraphernalia such as rattles; while women crafted woven robes, some plain, some elaborately coloured. Rattles made from sheets of mountain-goat horn bent and then sewn to form volumetric triangles originally adorned with strands of mountain-goat wool. The art form is used in spindle whorls, house posts, welcome figures, combs, bent wood boxes, canoes, and other cultural objects.

=== Revival ===
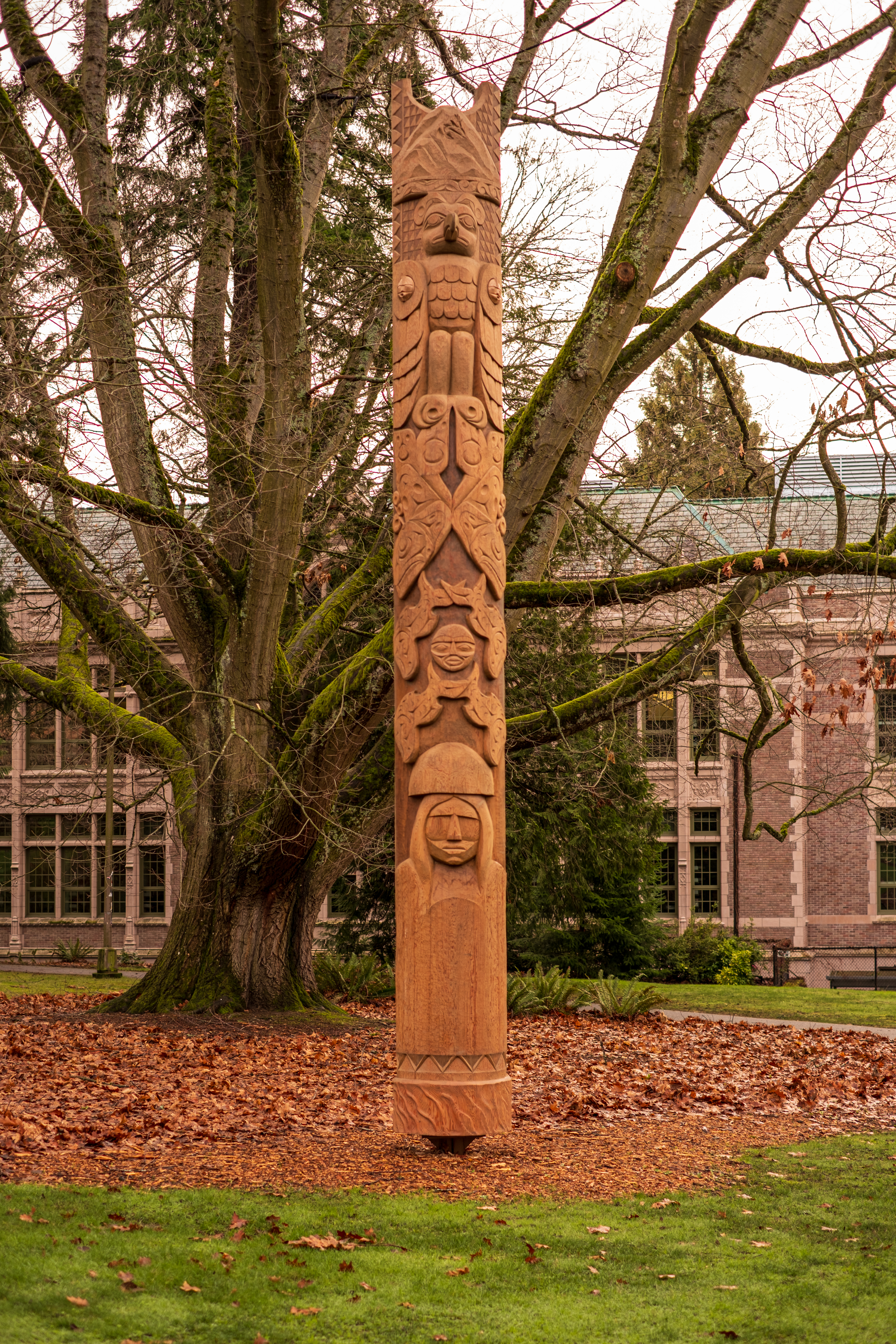
Coast Salish Story Pole on the University of Washington campus, near Denny Hall.

Coast Salish art has undergone a revival in recent years. One person involved in the revival is Squamish artist Aaron Nelson-Moody. In 2005 he carved a large cedar door to be used at the BC-Canada Pavilion in the 2006 Turin Olympic Game.

Cowichan artist Edward Joe, who has adapted the Coast Salish art form into fine jewelry and prints, says "(Coast) Salish art has as smooth slowing motion intended to create a calm mood. The stories, legends, and myths are depicted in many of my art pieces. Animals from the land, sea, and sky are designed in a playful manner."

On October 24, 2008, the Seattle Art Museum opened "S'abadeb—The Gifts: Pacific Coast Salish Art and Artists", a Coast Salish art exhibition from 75 works of art from national and international collections of both traditional and contemporary artists.

== Characteristics ==
It also differs from other Northwest Coast art in that it is more minimalist and straight forward. A belief in the overexposure of spirit images would weaken the spiritual powers of the beings portrayed, and as a result very few pieces were produced.

The "simplicity, antiquity, limited quantity and sometimes impenetrable iconography of (Coast) Salish art" have led to dismiss it in comparison to neighbor art forms, but Aldona Jonaitis in Art of the Northwest Coast remarks "Coast Salish art, like that of other Northwest Coast groups, responds to the social needs for which the archaic style was well suited... Coast Salish art cannot be judged according to alien values appropriate to other Northwest Coast groups, but, like most kinds of art, must be understood as visual statements meaningful and valuable to their creators."

== Coast Salish artists ==
- Margaret August
- Jody Broomfield
- Bonny Graham, also known as b.wyse]
- James Harry
- Doug LaFortune
- lessLIE
- Aaron Nelson-Moody
- Susan Point
- Luke Marston
- John Marston
- Debra Sparrow, Musqueam artist and weaver
- Laura Lee-Way-Laq
- Matika Wilbur is a Swinomish and Tulalip photographer, and the creator of Project 562, which documents contemporary Native Americans from the 562 federally-recognized tribes in the United States.
- Joseph M. Wilson
- Xwalacktun (Rick Harry), Sto:lo/Snuneymuxw artist of Indigenous language through font creation in traditional Coast Salish inspired design. Print artist, painter, public art and language preservation

== Gallery ==
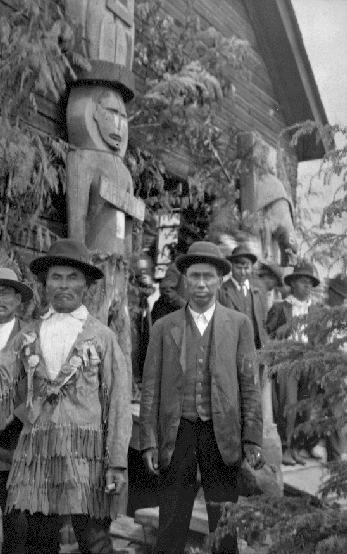
Musqueam people with house post in background.

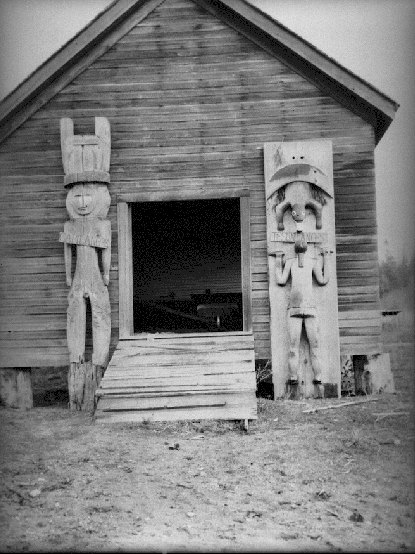
Musqueam house posts.

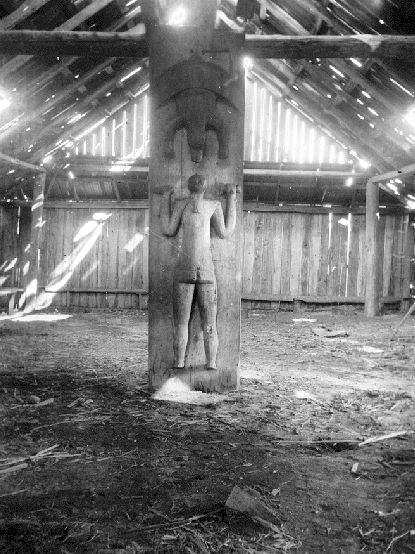
Musqueam house post.

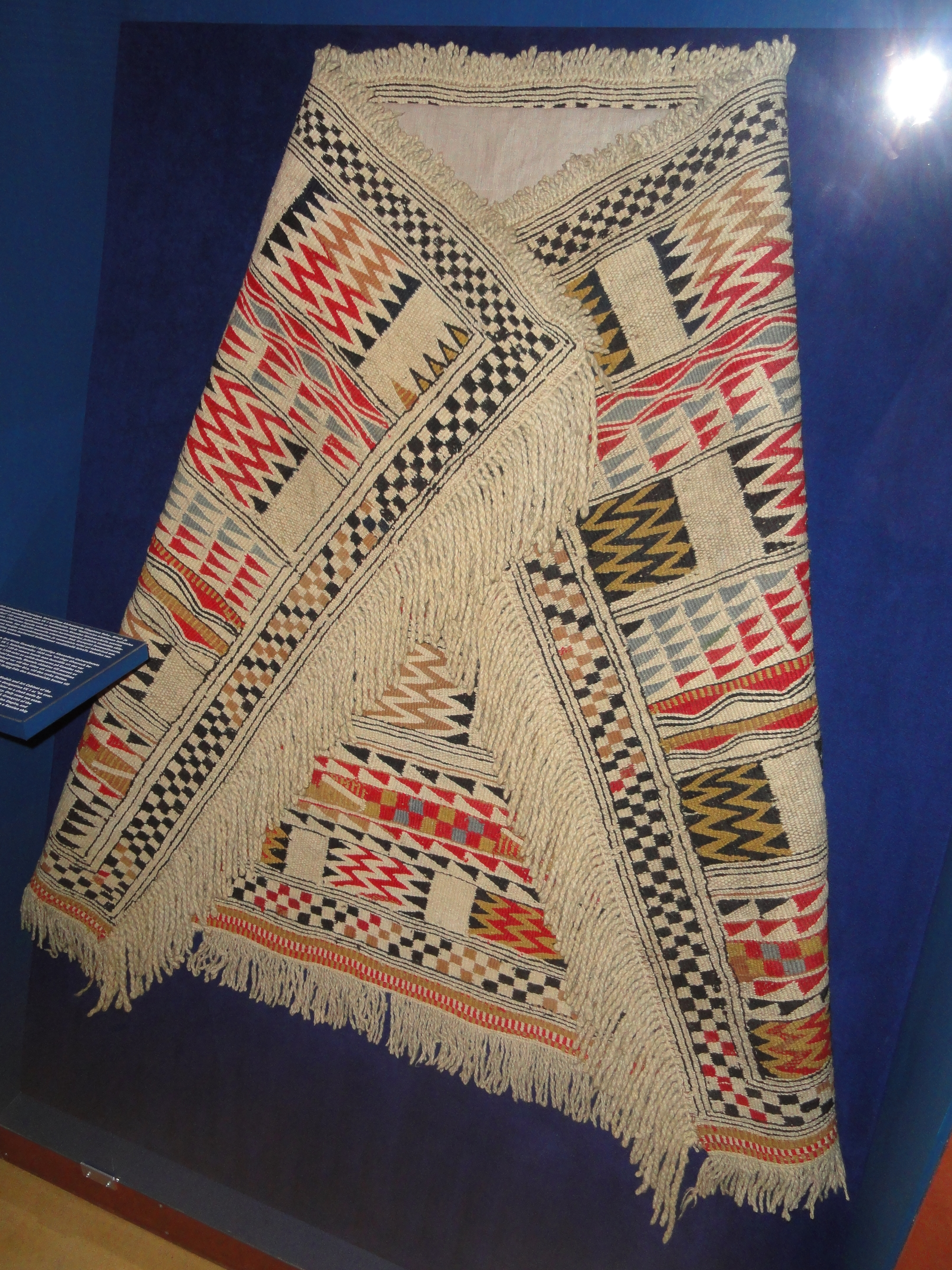
Salish cloak, late 1700s.

== See also ==
- Coast Salish languages
- Northwest Coast art
