= Susan Point =

First Nations artist from British Columbia (born 1952)

- Born: April 5, 1952 (age 74); Alert Bay, British Columbia
- Citizenship: Musqueam and Canadian
- Education: Self-taught
- Known for: Sculptor
- Movement: Coast Salish
- Awards: YWCA Woman of Distinction
- Elected: Royal Canadian Academy of Arts
- Website: susanpoint.com

Susan A. Point RCA (born 1952) is a Canadian artist from the Musqueam First Nation who works in the Coast Salish tradition. Her sculpture, prints and public art works include pieces installed at the Vancouver International Airport, the National Museum of the American Indian in Washington D.C., Stanley Park in Vancouver, the Museum of Anthropology at UBC, the Penn Museum in Philadelphia, and the city of Seattle.

== Biography ==
Point was born in Alert Bay while her parents, Edna Grant and Anthony Point were salmon fishing. Her parents both used the Salish language Halkomelem in their home on the Musqueam First Nation. In the early 1980s, she joined a group of artists interested in reviving the traditions of Coast Salish art and design, including artists such as Stan Greene, Rod Modeste, and Floyd Joseph. Little research had been done on Salish art, so Point taught herself the Salish traditions. She studied the collections of Coast Salish art at the University of British Columbia's Museum of Anthropology and at the Royal British Columbia Museum. There is broad agreement that Point's works were critical to the current efflorescence of contemporary Coast Salish art. She was a leader in expanding the audience for Salish art to a market that was heavily biased towards Northwest Coast artworks produced in northern Northwest Coast formline design principles. Her close study of the formal characteristics of historical works of Salish art laid the foundation for her contemporary productions – some based closely on new renderings in print form of historical spindle whorls in museum collections, and later expanding out into original forms in new media, such as glass, concrete, and bronze.

Much of her art practice has involved the adaptation of traditional spindle whorl carvings into the medium of screen printing. Her work helped revive Coast Salish design and brought new scholarly attention to her culture. She has produced more prints than any other artist on the Coast, with over 360 prints in her oeuvre by 2016. For several decades (starting in the late 1990s), she completed both a major public work of art within British Columbia or the Seattle metropolitan area along with a series of prints and works in glass each year.

A major retrospective of her work was shown by the Vancouver Art Gallery in 2017, Susan Point: Spindle Whorl.

== Works ==
Point's works include Salish Footprint in the Museum of Anthropology at the University of British Columbia, Musqueam house posts at the American Museum of Natural History, and carvings installed at the Vancouver International Airport and at Brockton Point in Stanley Park.

In 1995, Point's "Flight (Spindle Whorl)" was installed at the Vancouver International Airport. It is the largest spindle whorl in the world at 4.8 meters (16 feet) in diameter. The piece is set against a stone waterfall to symbolize the connection between land and sky.

In 2008, Point created "Buttress Runnels" for the Richmond Olympic Oval in Richmond, British Columbia. The runnels move water from the roof of the building away from the site. The runnels include cast images of the life of the Fraser River, including fish, sand, herons. A heron is used for the logo of the City of Richmond and the symbol figures prominently in stories and histories of the Musqueam people.

In 2009, Point's "Tree of Life" stained glass window was installed in Christ Church Cathedral in Vancouver. The design represents the Salish belief in the interconnectedness of all forms of life, uniting Christian theology with First Nations culture. Point was commissioned by the church to design the windows after winning a competition.

In 2010, Point created "A Timeless Circle," commissioned by the Municipality of Whistler and located at Maury Young Arts Centre, Whistler, BC. It is a sculptural work depicting eighty-six human faces on the cast-bronze plates, installed in five two-sided sections.

Since 2014, the Penn Museum of the University of Pennsylvania has displayed a glass whorl by Point, made in 1994, in its "Native American Voices: The People – Here and Now" exhibit.

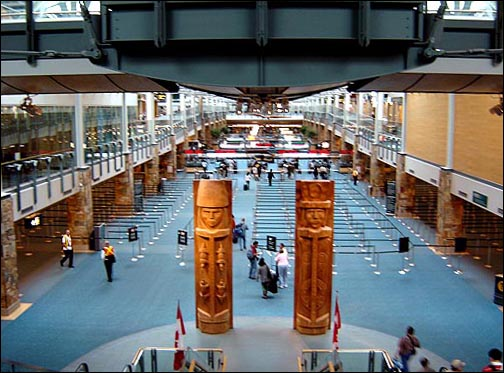
Indigenous posts inside Vancouver International Airport

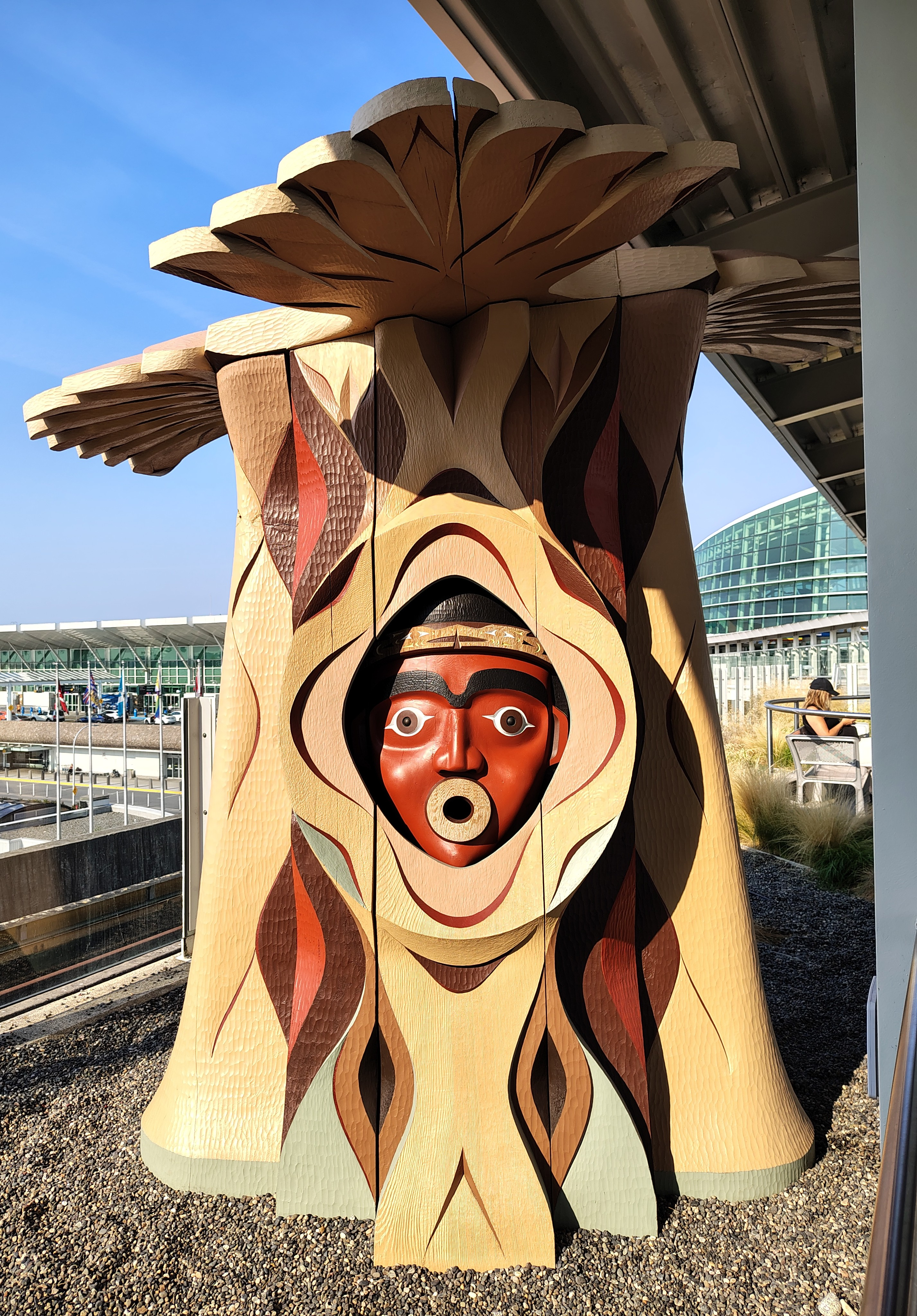
Cedar Connection (2009) on the footbridge between Vancouver International Airport and YVR–Airport station

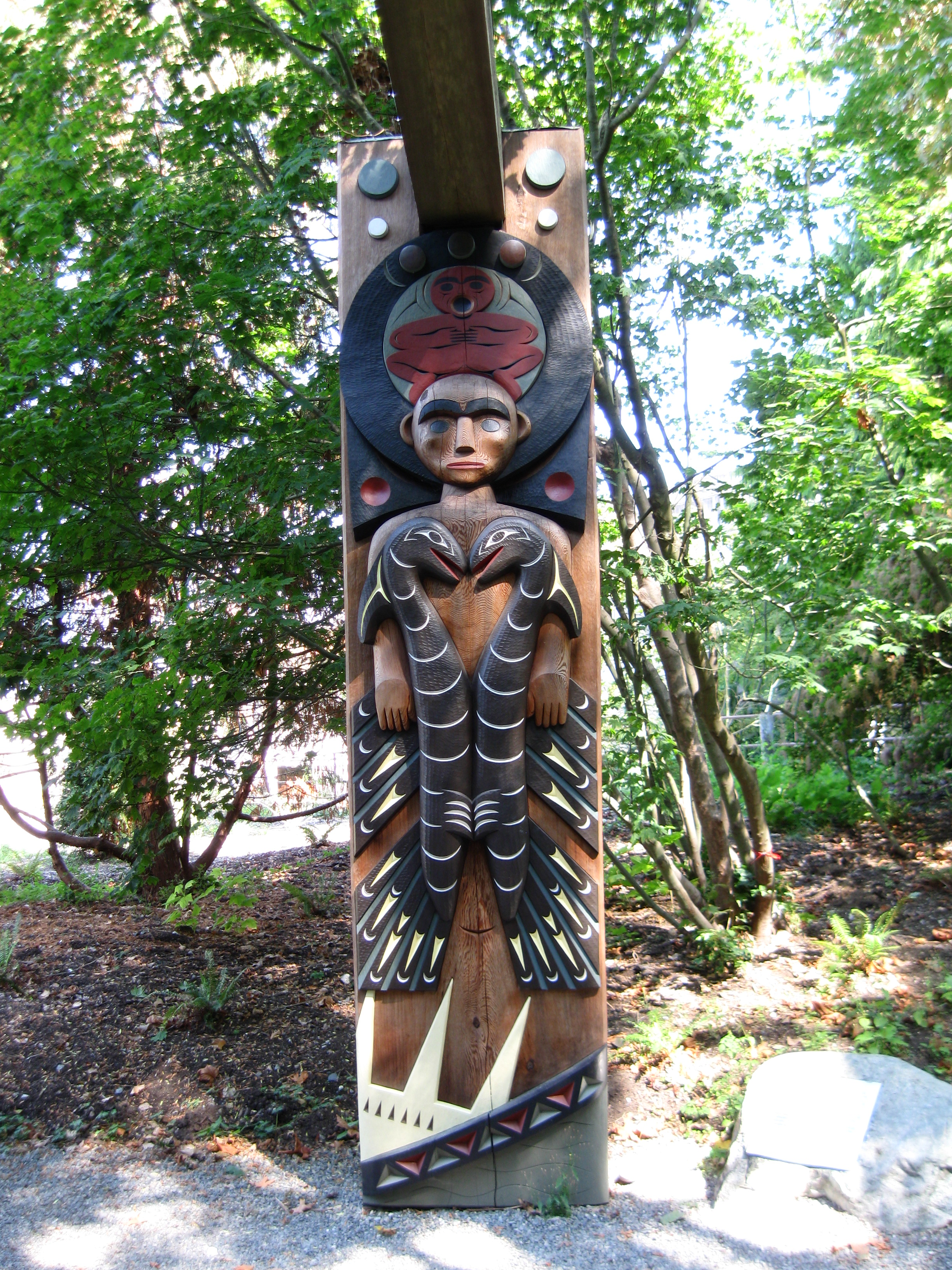
A Musqueam house post behind the Museum of Anthropology at UBC

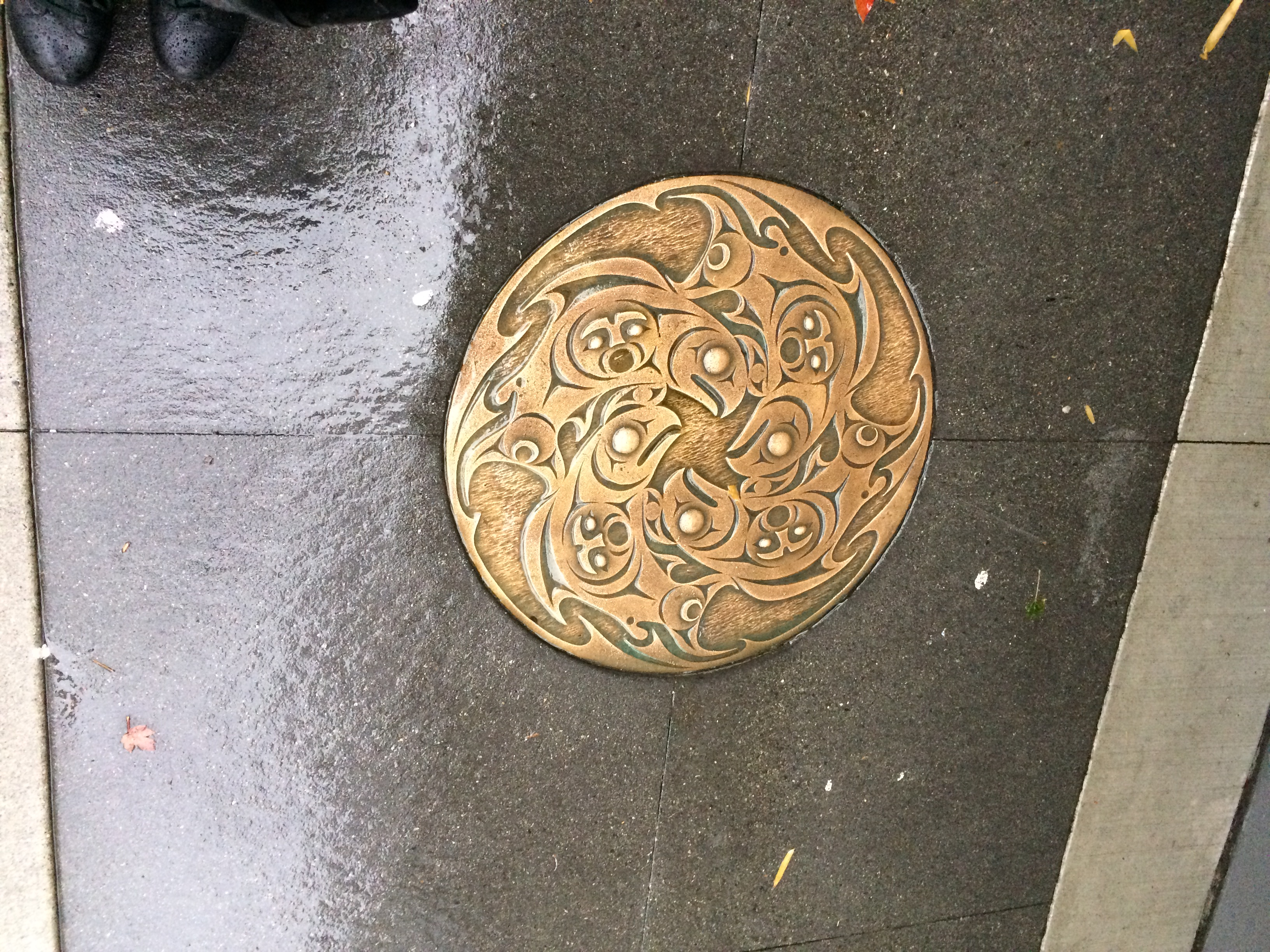
Manhole cover in Vancouver's Coal Harbour

== Awards and honours ==
- Honorary doctorate in Fine Arts from the University of British Columbia (2000), University of Victoria (2000), Simon Fraser University (2008), and Emily Carr University of Art and Design (2008)
- Appointment to the Royal Canadian Academy of Arts (2004)
- National Aboriginal Achievement Award (2004)
- Officer of the Order of Canada (2006)
- One of B.C.'s 100 most influential women (2010)
- Queen Elizabeth II Diamond Jubilee Medal (2012)
- Audain Prize for Lifetime Achievement in the Visual Arts (2018)

== See also ==
- List of First Nations people
