= Ein Gev =

Place in Israel

Ein Gev: עין גב (Hebrew)
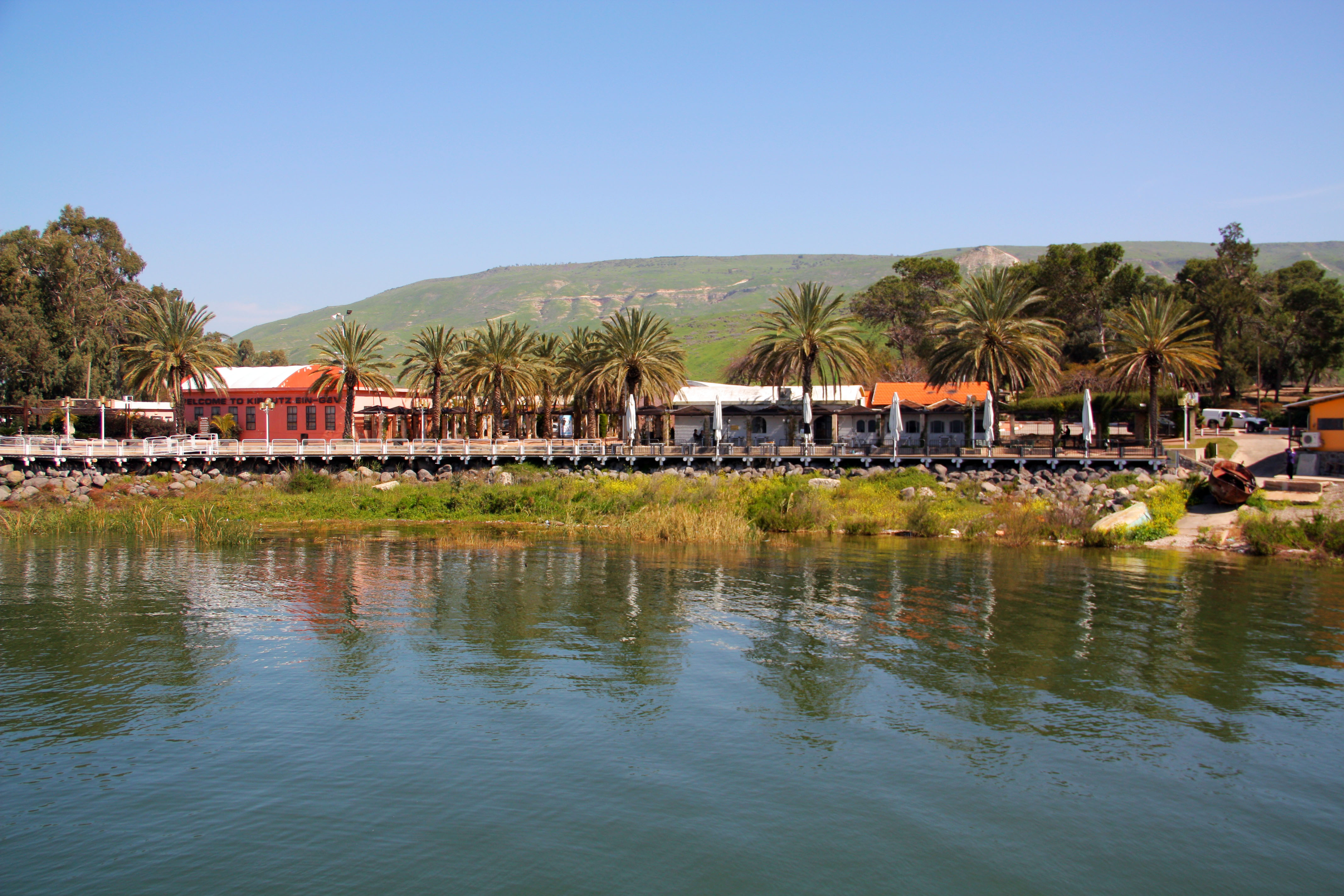

- Location within Northeast Israel Location within Israel
- Coordinates: 32°46′58″N 35°38′23″E
- Country: Israel
- District: Northern
- Subdistrict: Kinneret
- Council: Emek HaYarden
- Affiliation: Kibbutz Movement
- Founded: 6 July 1937
- Founder: Czechoslovak, German, Austrian and Lithuanian Jews
- Population (2024): 591
- Website: www.eingev.co.il

Ein Gev (Hebrew: עין גב) is a kibbutz in northern Israel. Located on the eastern shore of the Sea of Galilee near the ruins of the Greco-Roman settlement of Hippos, it falls under the jurisdiction of Emek HaYarden Regional Council. In 2024 its population was 591.

== History ==
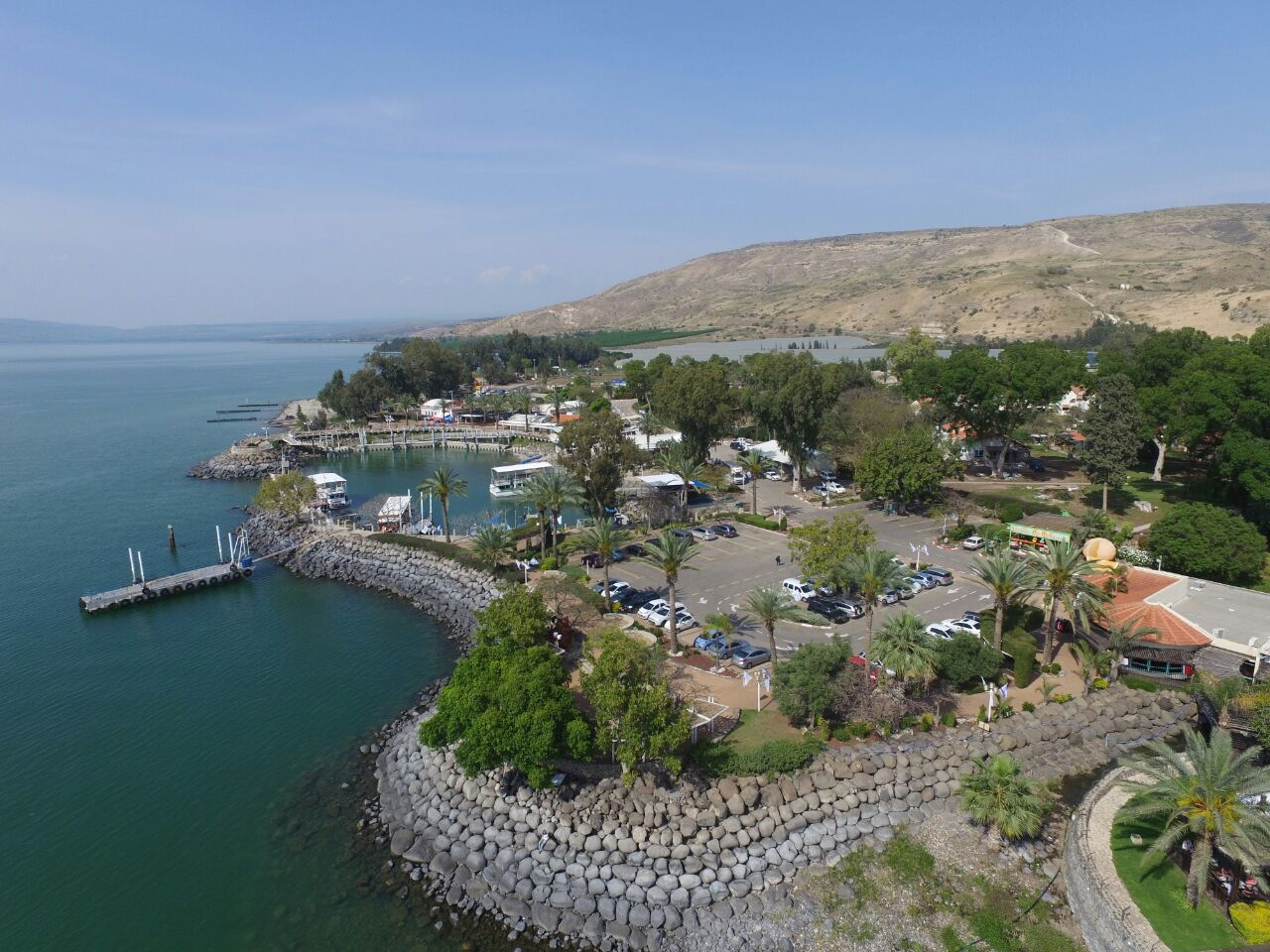
View of Ein Gev

Ein Gev, named after the nearby Arab village Al-Nuqayb, came into being on 6 July 1937 during the 1936–1939 Arab revolt in Palestine as a "tower and stockade" settlement, a common debut for many kibbutzim during that era, and quickly established itself as a viable community. The original settlers were immigrants from Czechoslovakia, Germany, Austria, and the Baltic countries. Using intensive cultivation methods, they developed banana plantations. They also fished the nearby Sea of Galilee. By 1947 it had a population of 450.

Situated along a border shared with Syria, Ein Gev was shelled during the Battles of the Kinarot Valley and in other engagements during the 1948 Arab–Israeli War. Shooting incidents remained common for the next nineteen years. These dangers were only eliminated when Israel won control of the neighbouring Golan Heights in the 1967 Six-Day War.

Due to the fact it was situated in the Israel–Syria demilitarised zone under the 1949 Armistice Agreements, Ein Gev was claimed by Syria as its territory during negotiations for a peace agreement in the 1990s. The Israeli government rejected the claim on the grounds that it was west of the 1923 border agreement between Mandatory Palestine and the French Mandate of Syria.

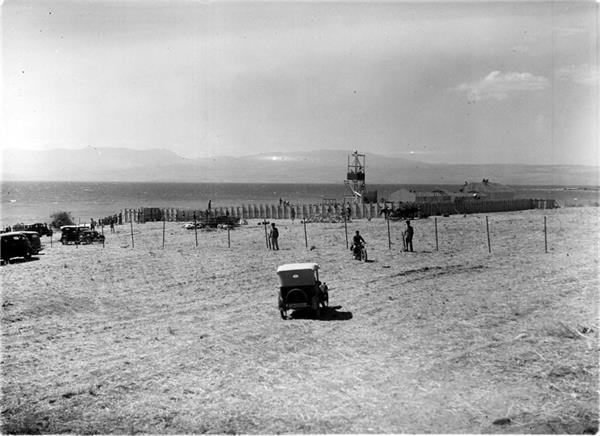
Ein Gev first attempt at settlement 1920

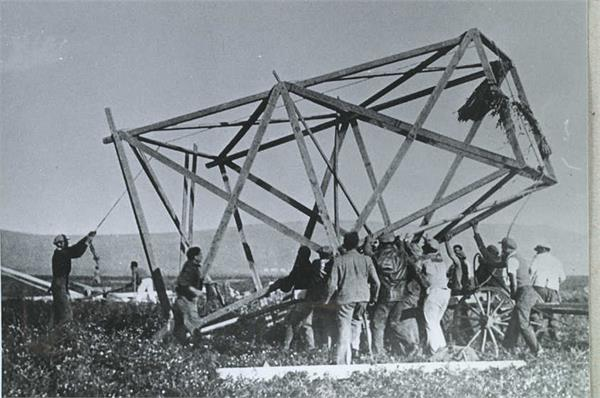
Ein Gev erecting tower 1937

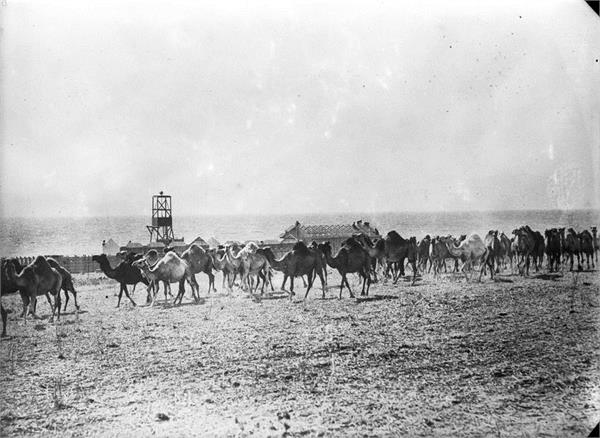
Ein Gev 1937

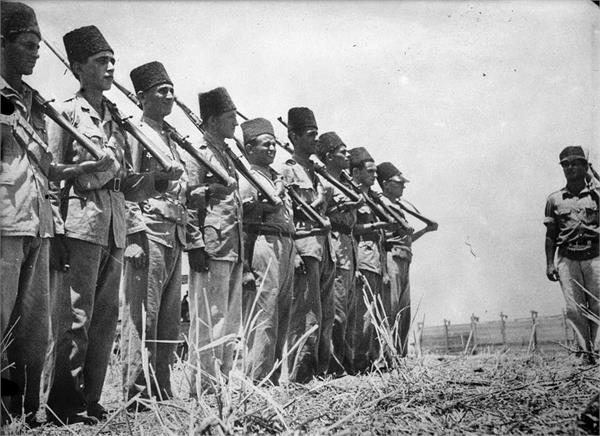
Ein Gev guards 1937

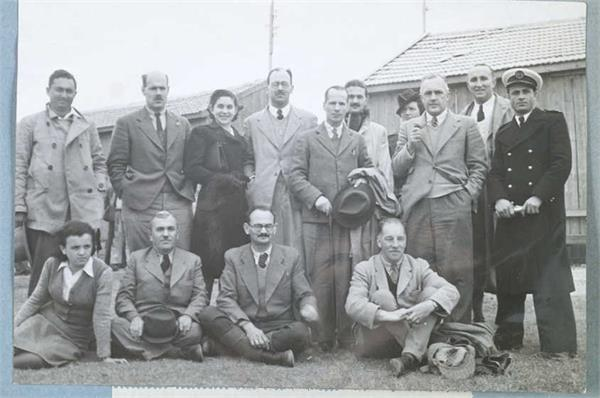
Ein Gev visit by Joseph Weitz 1942

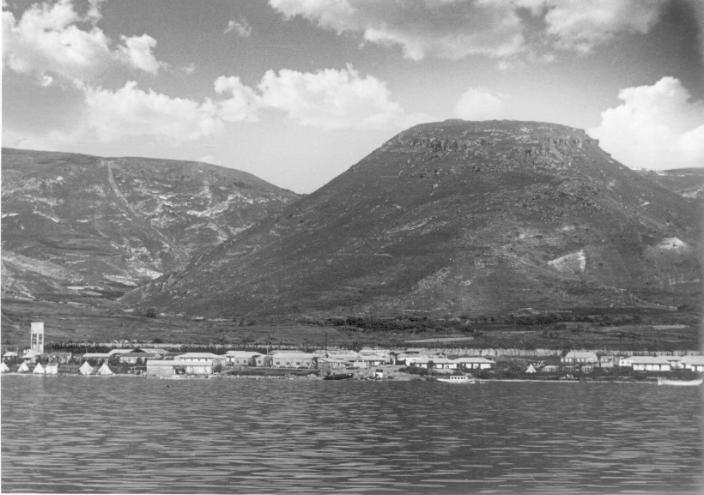
Ein-Gev from Sea of Galilee, 1947

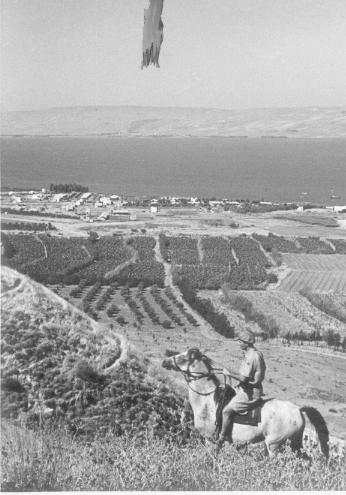
View of Ein-Gev from the East, 1947

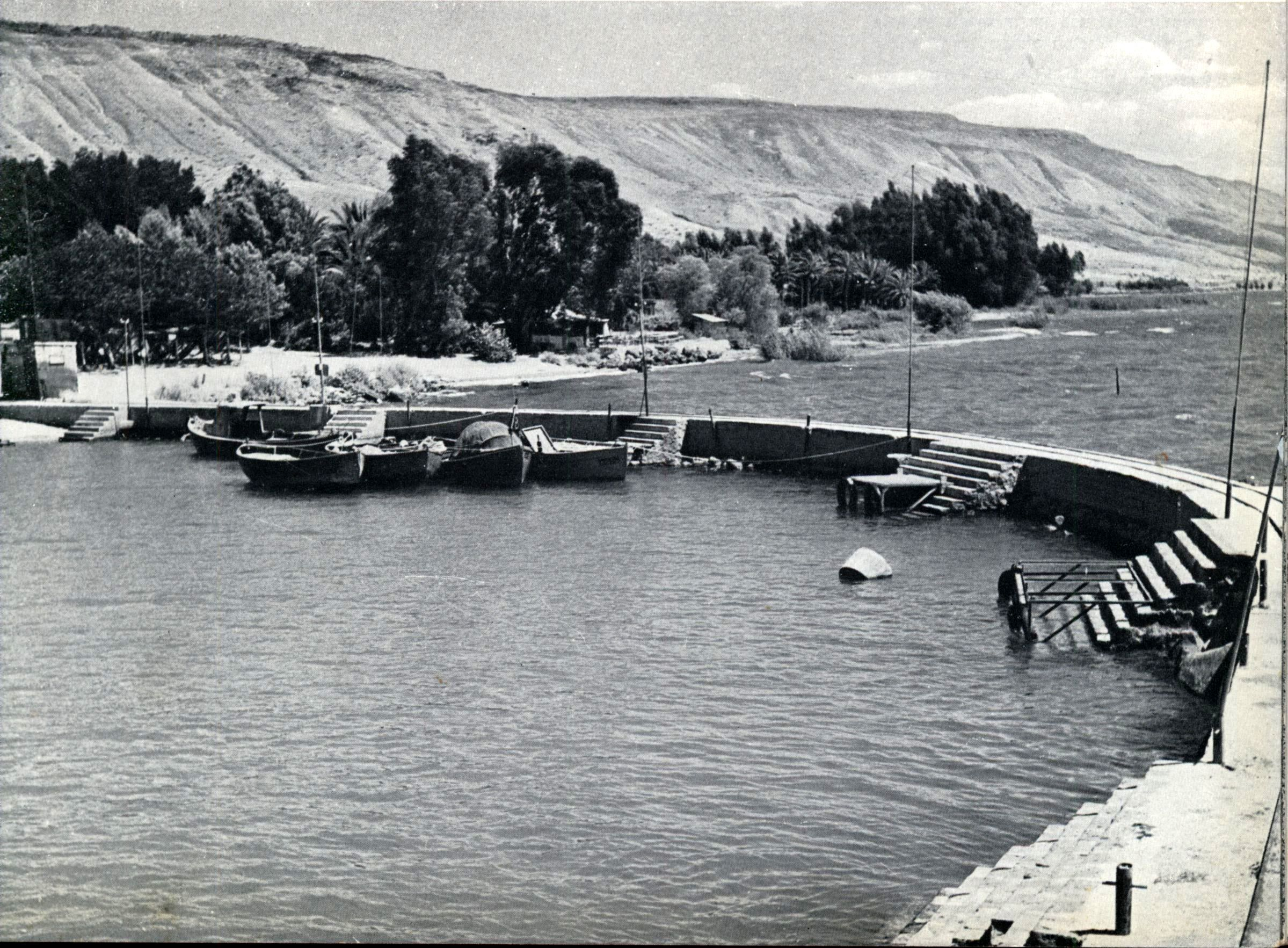
Ein Gev pier, c 1947

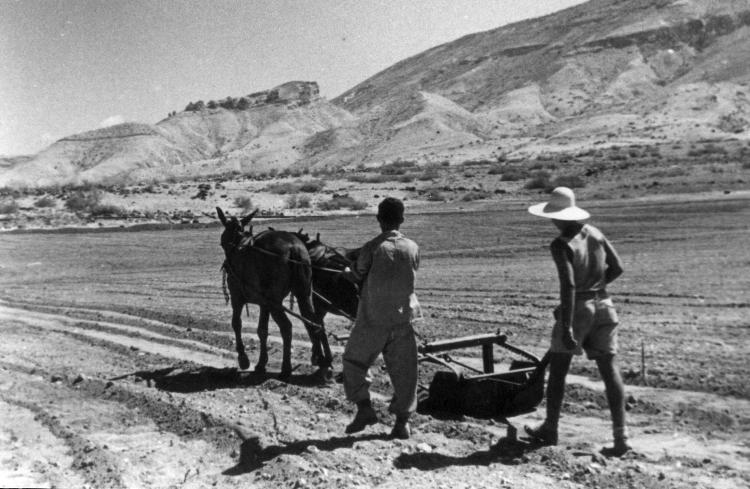
Palmach members working at Ein Gev, before the 1948 war

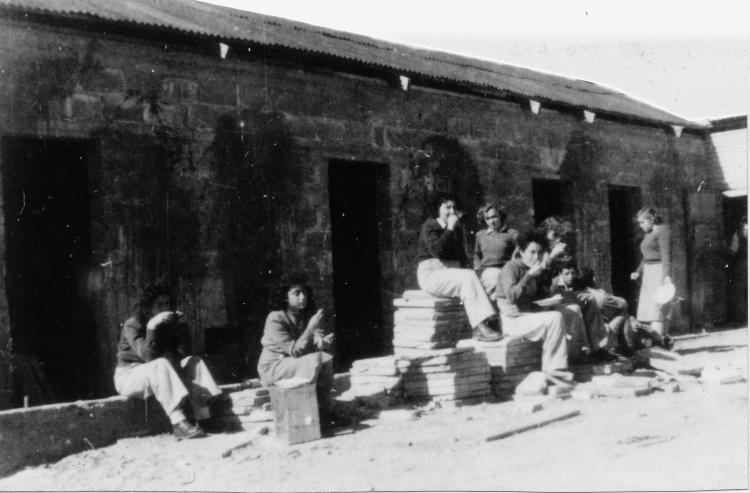
Women from Yiftach Brigade working at Ein Gev. 1948

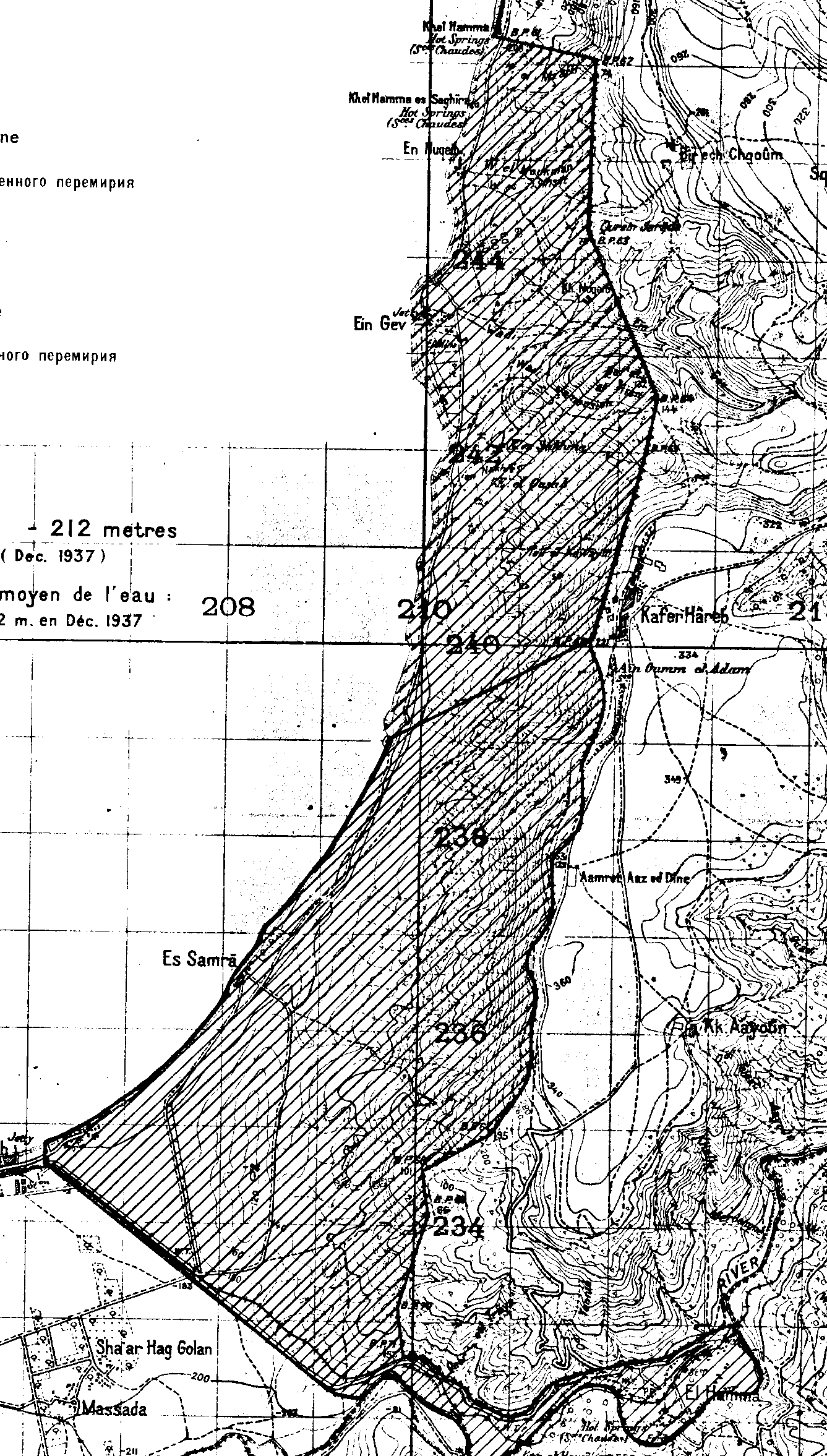
Ein Gev - Al Samra - Al Hamma Demilitarized Zone, per the Israel–Syria Mixed Armistice Commission

== Economy ==
The kibbutz operates a holiday resort and a fish restaurant. Agricultural branches include banana plantations and dairy farming. The kibbutz built a 2,500-seat concert hall to accommodate the Ein Gev Music Festival, held annually during Passover.

== Archaeology ==
Near the present-day village an important site from the Mesolithic Kebaran culture has been excavated, named Ein Gev (I-III) in archaeological literature.

Nahal Ein Gev II (NEG II) is a prehistoric site some two kilometers east of the Sea of Galilee, on the northern terrace of Ein Gev Stream (Hebrew: "Nahal Ein Gev"), where a village of the late Natufian culture was discovered (see article).

The Greco-Roman Decapolis city of Hippos stood on the hill overlooking the kibbutz. The archaeological site is currently being excavated.

== Notable people ==
- Teddy Kollek (1911–2007), politician, mayor of Jerusalem from 1965 to 1993, and founder of the Jerusalem Foundation
- Effi Eitam (born 1952), retired brigadier general, former commander of the 91st Division, and politician
