= James Harry =

James Nexw’Kalus-Xwalacktun Harry (born October 31, 1989) is a Squamish and Kwakwakaʼwakw artist based in Vancouver, British Columbia. He is the son of hereditary chief Xwalacktun, who introduced Harry to Coast Salish art.

== Early life and education ==
Harry was born on October 31, 1989, to father Xwalacktun, and mother Jennifer Kleinsteuber. He has one brother, Austin Aan’yas Harry, who is also an artist, specializing in animation and game design. He began carving at the age of five under the guidance of his father.

Harry received his Bachelor of Fine Arts from Emily Carr University of Art and Design in 2014. While studying ECUAD, Harry travelled to Scotland on an exchange trip where he learned to cast bronze while teaching sculpting and painting in Scottish communities.

== Career ==
Harry's art is influenced by Coast Salish stories and philosophies. He is married to Trinidadian and Japanese artist Lauren Brevner whom is a frequent collaborator. Their collaborative practice forms Studio Lauren James. Together, their work has been featured at the Vancouver Art Gallery as well as in various other public spaces across the Lower Mainland as part of the Vancouver Mural Festival and other initiatives connected to local school districts.

Harry and Brevner held their first solo exhibition, titled "The Seventh" at the Or Gallery in Vancouver, British Columbia in October 2024. The exhibition marked ten years of collaboration for the pair.

Harry and Brevner's work is featured at the future South Granville station in the Fairview and Kitsilano neighbourhoods of Vancouver. The work is titled Sínulhḵay ("double-headed serpent"), and is a 40-foot sculpture made using yakisugi red cedar wood wrapped with metal. The sculpture was erected in June 2025.
