= Jody Broomfield =

Canadian artist

- Born: 11 October 1976 (age 49); North Vancouver, British Columbia, Canada
- Movement: Coast Salish

Jody Broomfield (born 11 September 1976) is a Canadian artist working in the Coast Salish tradition. His work includes several coin designs for the Royal Canadian Mint.

Broomfield was born in North Vancouver, British Columbia, and later moved to the Capilano Reserve. In 1999, he decided to leave his jobs in building maintenance and youth work and devote his full-time to art.

Broomfield's design was used for a medallion given to all at the closing ceremonies of the 2006 Winter Olympic Games in Turin. The design represented the Squamish, Musqueam, Lil'wat and Tsleil-Waututh, the four nations whose traditional territories were the site of the 2010 Winter Olympic Games. The same design was then used by the Royal Canadian Mint for a $75 gold coin.

Broomfield also designed a $300 face value coin issued by the mint which features a moon mask. The mint struck 1,200 of the coins and sold them at $1,600 per coin.
