= Spindle (textiles) =

Spike used for spinning fibers into yarn

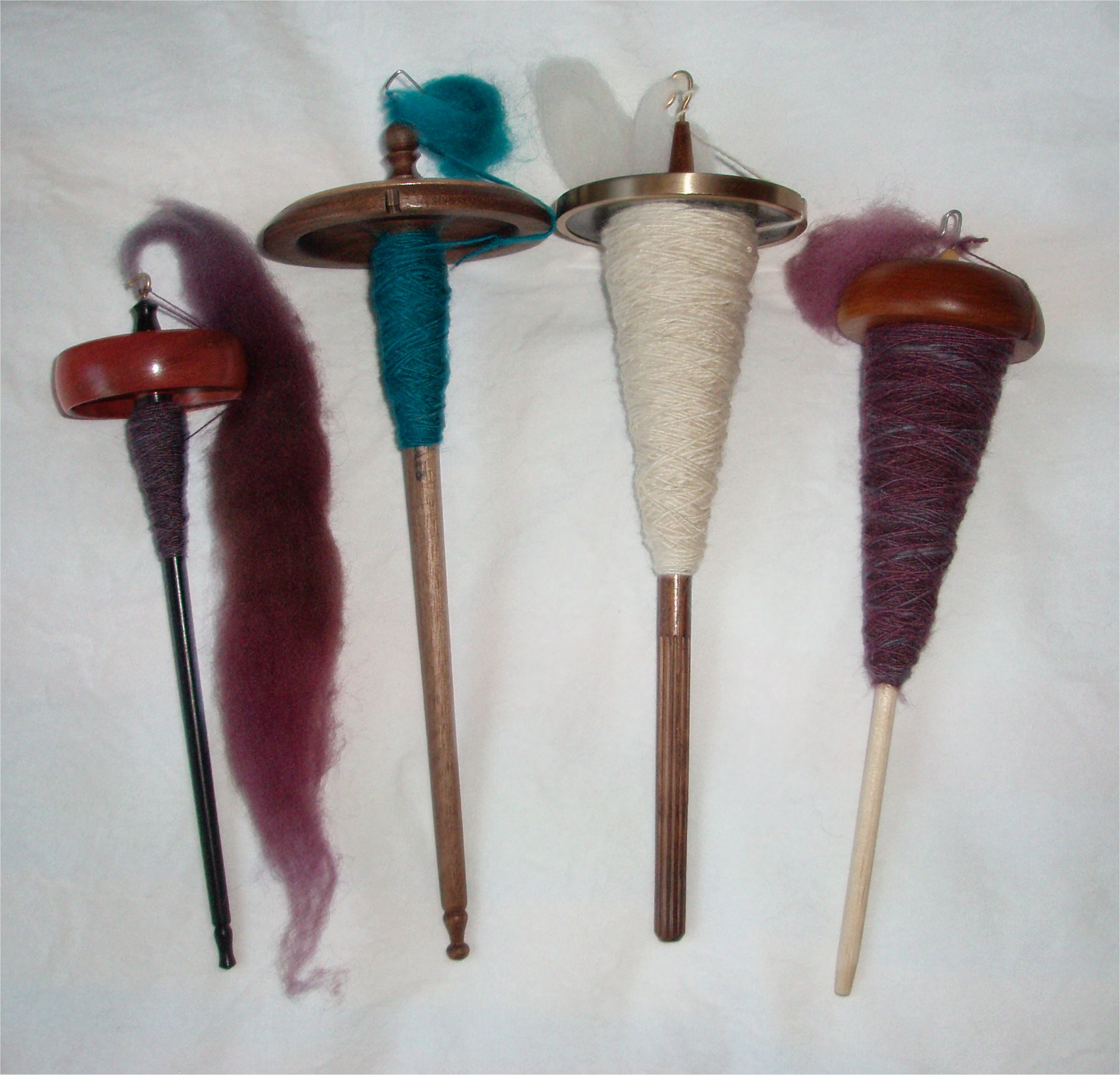
Modern top-whorl drop spindles. The hook at the top allows these to be suspended and the cop is built up below the disk-shaped whorl in a conical shape.

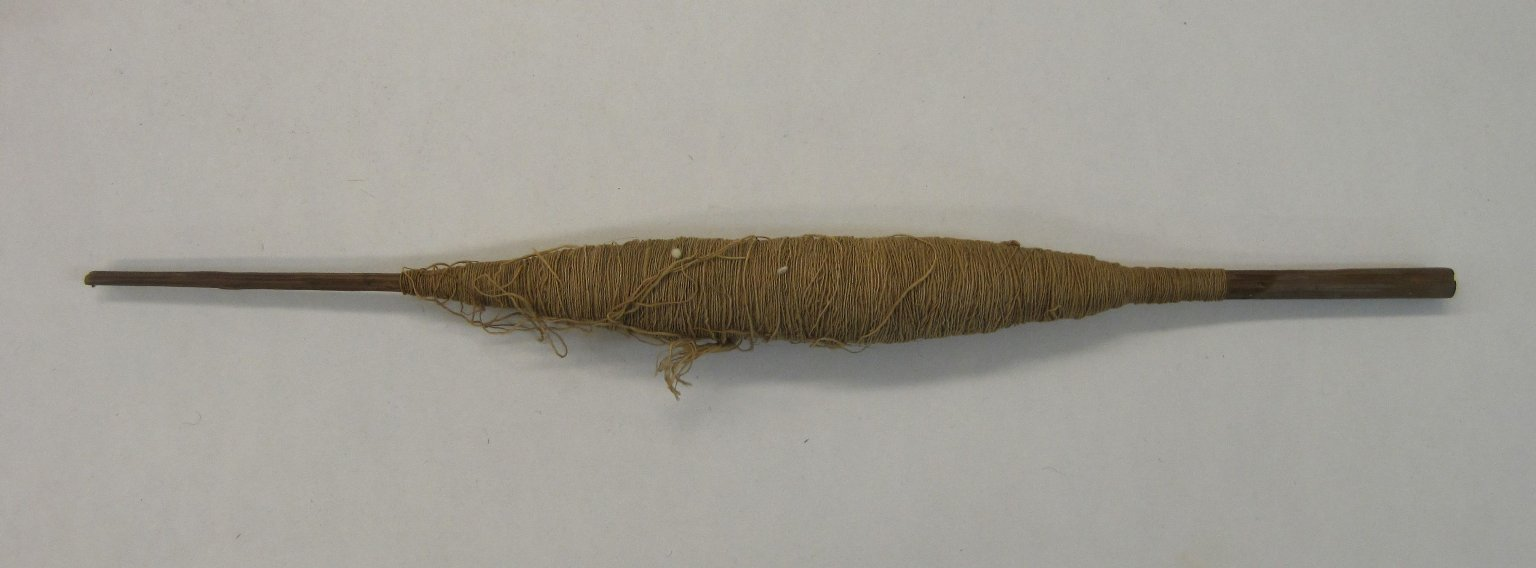
Spindle with cotton yarn, without whorl, representing the "spindle-shape".

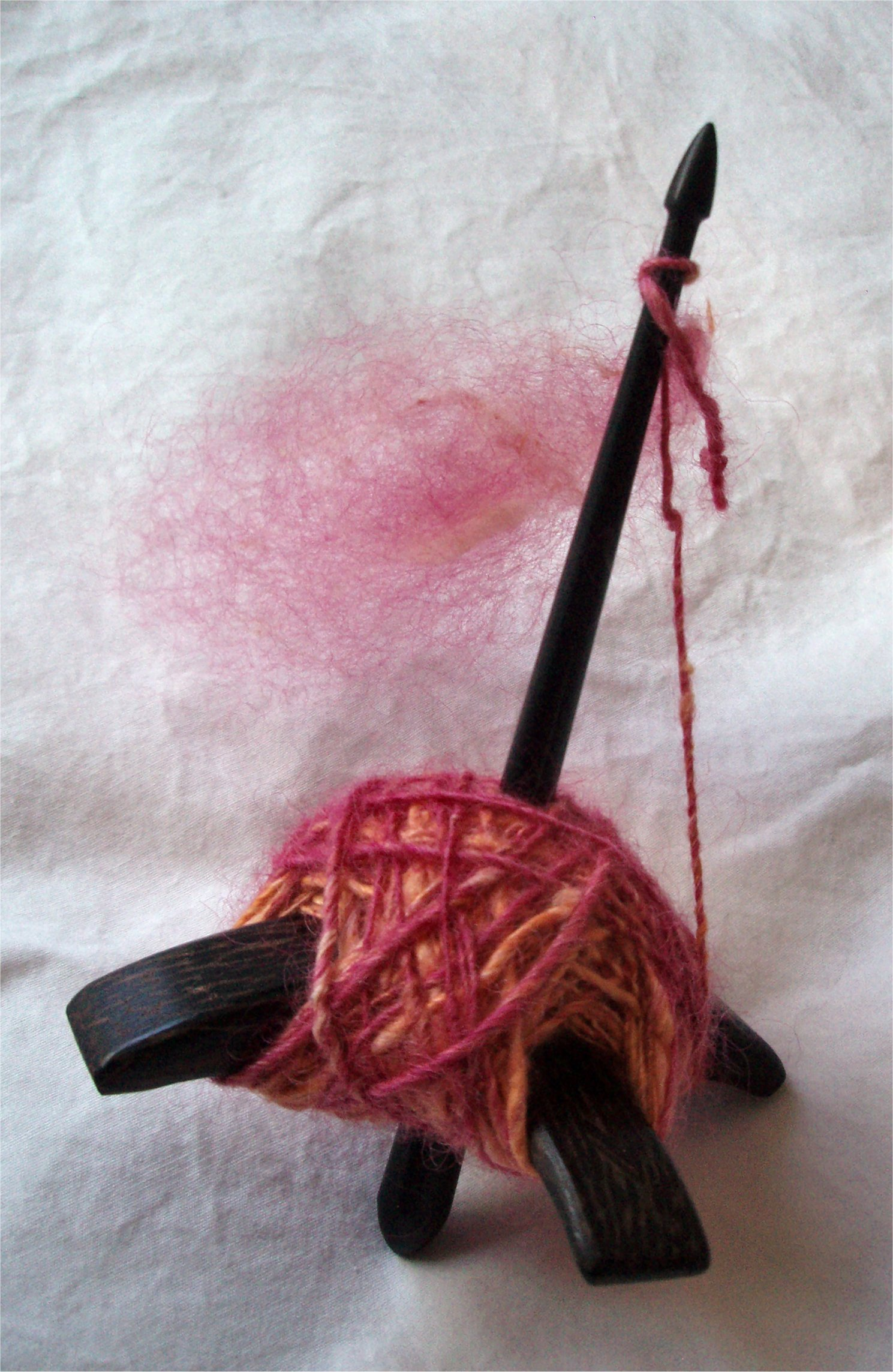
A modern Turkish spindle is an example of a low-whorl suspended spindle where the whorl is made up of interlocking arms. Here the cop is wound around the arms to form a ball.

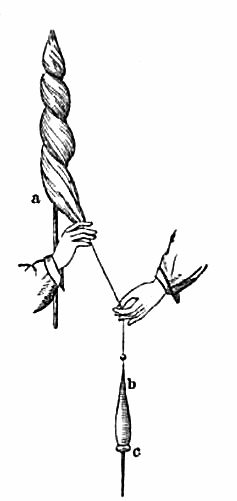
Spinning with a suspended spindle (below) and distaff (above).

A spindle is a straight spike, usually made from wood, used for spinning, twisting fibers such as wool, flax, hemp, and cotton into yarn. It is often weighted at either the bottom, middle, or top, commonly by a disc or spherical object called a whorl; many spindles, however, are weighted simply by thickening their shape towards the bottom, e.g. Orenburg and French spindles. The spindle may also have a hook, groove, or notch at the top to guide the yarn. Spindles come in many different sizes and weights depending on the thickness of the yarn one desires to spin.

== History ==
The origin of the first wooden spindle is lost to history because the materials did not survive. Whorl-weighted spindles date back at least to Neolithic times; spindle whorls have been found in archaeological digs around the world. Possible remains of spindle whorls were found in a Natufian village at Nahal Ein Gev II archeological site, Israel, from 12000 years ago.

A spindle is also part of traditional spinning wheels where it is horizontal, such as the Indian charkha and the great or walking wheel. In industrial yarn production, spindles are used as well; see spinning jenny, spinning mule and ring spinning.

The wood traditionally favoured for making spindles was that of Euonymus europaeus, from which derives the traditional English name spindle bush.

== Hand spindles ==
Modern hand spindles fall into three basic categories: suspended spindles, supported spindles and grasped spindles. Supported and suspended spindles are normally held vertically, grasped spindles may be held vertically, horizontally or at an angle depending on the tradition.

Suspended spindles are so named because they are suspended to swing from the yarn after rotation has been started. Drop Spindles are a popular type of suspended spindle and get their name because the spindle is allowed to drop down while the thread is formed, allowing for a greater length of yarn to be spun before winding on. Suspended spindles also permit the spinner to move around while spinning, going about their day. However, there are practical limits to their size/weight.

Most supported spindles continue to rest with the tip on one's thigh, on the ground, on a table, or in a small bowl while rotating. Supported spindles come in a great variety of sizes, such as the very large, ~30" Navajo spindle, the small, extremely fast, metal takli for spinning cotton, and the tiniest Orenburg spindles (~20 cm, 15gm) for spinning gossamer lace yarns.

Grasped spindles are also known as: hand spindles, in the hand spindles, in hand spindles and twiddled spindles; there appears no consensus on nomenclature for this category of spindles though there have been various attempts at creating an agreed nomenclature including dividing this category of spindles into two, such as Crowfoot's attempts to define the difference between grasped and in hand spindles or merging this category into others, such as Franquemont's approach of classing them as supported spindles.

Grasped spindles remain held in the hand using finger or wrist movements to turn the spindle. French spindles are "twiddled" between the fingers of one hand while some types of Romanian spindles are grasped in the fist and turned through rotation of the wrist.

While spindle types are divided into these three main categories, some traditional spinning styles employ multiple or blended techniques. For example the Akha spindle, a short spindle with a large center-whorl disc, is supported by the hand of the spinner during drafting of cotton fibre, but during the adding of extra twist to stabilize the yarn, the spindle is dropped to rest on the yarn.

A familiar sight from history books is a spindle used in conjunction with a distaff, an upright stick with a large quantity of loose fibre wound around it, to be easily accessed. There are many other methods for controlling the pre-spun fibre, such as coiling it around one's lower arm, or through a bracelet, or wrapping it loosely around a yarn braid hanging from one's wrist.

Another way spindles are categorised is by the location of the whorl. The whorl, where present, may be located near the top, bottom or center of the spindle. For example a top-whorl drop spindle will have the whorl located near the top of the shaft underneath a hook that allows the spindle to suspend as it is being spun. The newly spun yarn is wound below the whorl and forms a 'cop'. Depending on the location of the whorl and style of the spindle, the cop can be conical, football or ball shaped and it can be wound above, below or over the whorl.

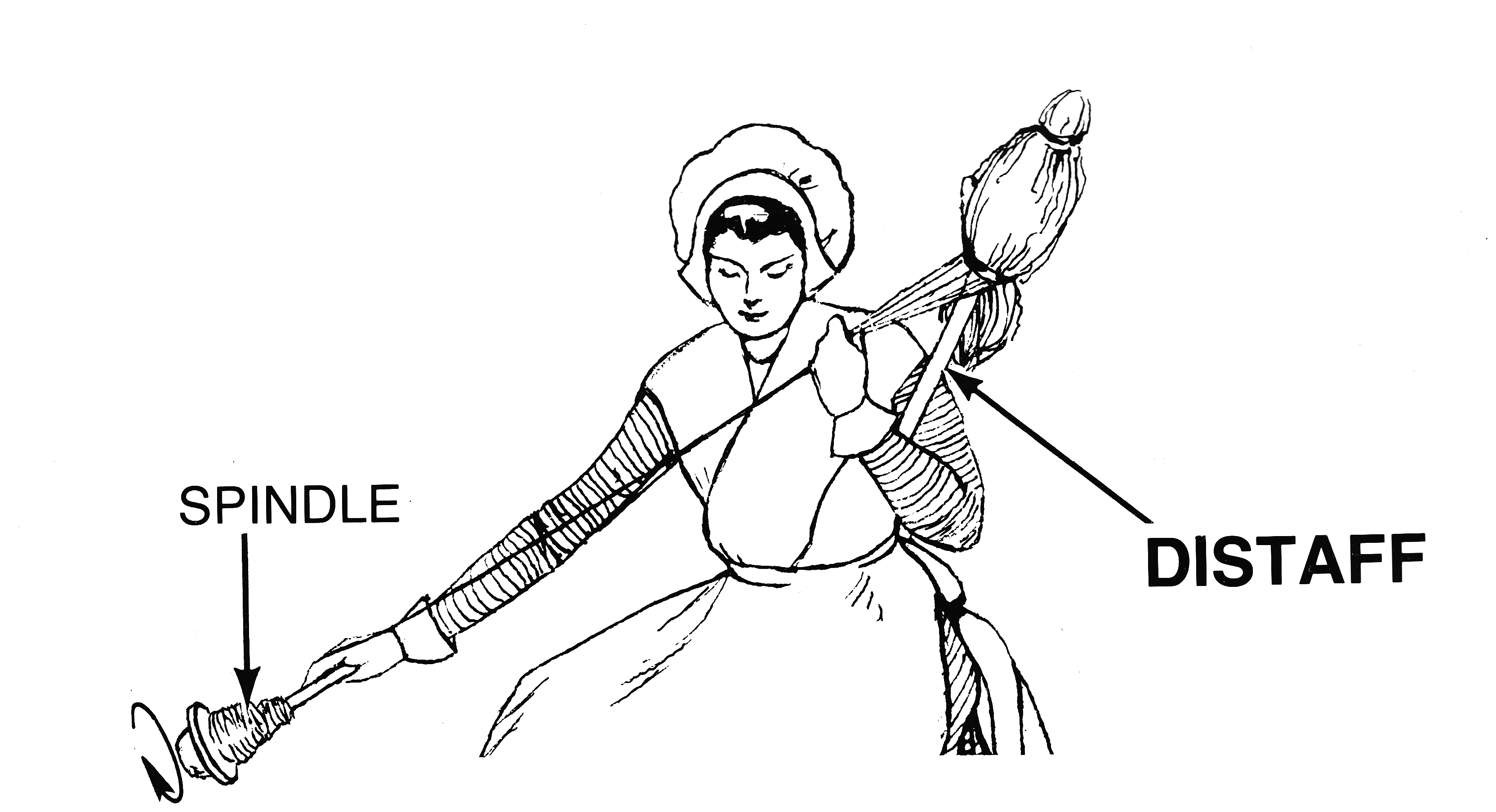
A grasped spindle being used with a distaff.

Spindles can also be used for plying: intertwining two or more single strands of yarn together in order to create a stronger, more balanced, more durable yarn.

== Anatomy ==
While hand spindles vary, there are some similarities in the parts that make up a spindle.

=== Shaft ===
Spindle shafts can be made out of a variety of materials such as wood, metal, bone or plastic. They may have very little shaping or be dramatically shaped enough to form part of the whorl. Shafts may be left plain or decorated with painting or carving.

The shaft is how the spinner inserts twist through turning it between the fingers or rolling it between the hand and another part of their anatomy, such as their thigh. The thickness of the shaft affects how fast the spindles spins, with narrower shafts causing a spindle to spin faster.

Many spindles will have a point at the top of the shaft to fix the thread to. Options include a simple length of shaft to tie the thread around, a shaped notch or bulb, or a hook.

=== Whorl ===
A whorl is a weight that is added to many types of spindles and can be made out of a large variety of materials including wood, metal, glass, plastic, stone, clay or bone. Whorls may be decorated or left plain, and they may be affixed permanently to the shaft or they may be removable.

Whorl shapes vary greatly and can include ball-shaped, disk-shaped and cross shaped whorls. The shape and mass distribution of the whorl affects the momentum it gives to the spindle while it is spinning. For example a center weighted whorl will spin very fast and short, while a rim-weighted disk-shaped whorl will spin longer and slower.

Whorls can be located near the top, middle or bottom of the spindle shaft. Whorl location can affect the stability of the spindle, with bottom whorl spindles being considered more stable.

=== Cop ===
The cop is not initially an intrinsic part of the spindle; however, as it is formed it plays a part in the spindle anatomy. Once a length of yarn or thread is spun it is wound around the spindle shaft or whorl to form a cop or a ball. As more yarn or thread is spun this makes the spindle heavier and more center-weighted, which has an effect on the momentum of the spindle. The overall shape of the cop and the skill in winding it also has an impact on how the spindle spins and how much thread or yarn can be stored on a spindle before it is "full".

Cops can be wound in a ball, cone or football shape.

== Religious references ==
The spindle is closely associated with many goddesses, including the Germanic Holda, and Greek Artemis and Athena. It is often connected with fate, as the Greek Fates and the Norse Norns work with yarns that represent lives.

In Christianity, the apocryphal Gospel of James portrays the Virgin Mary as engaged in spinning thread for the Temple Curtain when the angel Gabriel tells her that she is going to bear Jesus.

== Cultural references ==
Most modern illustrations of the fairy tale The Sleeping Beauty have the princess pricking her finger on the distaff of a modern flyer spinning wheel; this version of the wheel was either not invented or not as commonly used across Europe when the major versions of the story were commonly told. The Perrault and Brothers Grimm editions have her pricking her finger on a spindle, and some versions of the story have her pricking it on a great wheel, which is essentially a wheel-powered spindle.

Rumpelstiltskin is another Brothers Grimm fairytale featuring a spindle, a key tool used by the miller's daughter in the story.

== Biological references ==
In biology, the spindle apparatus is an assembly of proteins and DNA that forms during cell division to separate sister chromatids during mitosis or meiosis of eukaryotic cells. The word "mitosis" is derived from the Greek word "mitos," meaning warp thread.

== Types ==
=== Supported spindles ===
Supported spindles spin on surfaces such as bowls that are usually ceramic or wooden. This type of spindle gives the user more control of the weight of the yarn. The various types of supported spindles range due to the difference in styles of spinning and yarn weight. Navajo spindles have longer shafts that should reach from the ground to the top of the thigh. The spun yarn is wound above the whorl. In Icelandic Viking times, the people used a high whorl lap spindle to spin wool into yarn. The high whorl lap spindle has a whorl on top with a hook on the top and a long shaft like other supported spindles. Unlike the Navajo spindle, however, the spun yarn is wrapped around the lower end of the spindle. The roving is prepped first by drafting it before the wool is spun into yarn. The separation between the drafting and spinning creates a softer yarn. Since it is a supported spindle, the yarn is less strained, which also makes the yarn soft.

=== Bottom whorl drop spindles ===
A typical bottom whorl spindle has the spun single ply yarn above the whorl instead of below it like top whorl drop spindles. Bottom whorl spindles are the preferred spindle for plying yarn. Turkish drop spindles have a low whorl spindle that have two arms that intersect to make a cross. Like other drop spindles it is spun and then it hangs while the wool is being drafted and the twist travels up the wool. When winding the spun yarn on to the arms it usually is put over and under the arms on the spindle. Even though it turns much more slowly than winding onto a regular spindle, it creates a center pull ball of yarn.

The Scottish drop spindle is called fairsaid, farsadh, or dealgan.

=== Top whorl drop spindles ===
Top whorl spindles commonly have a disc on the top of the shaft with a hook at the top.

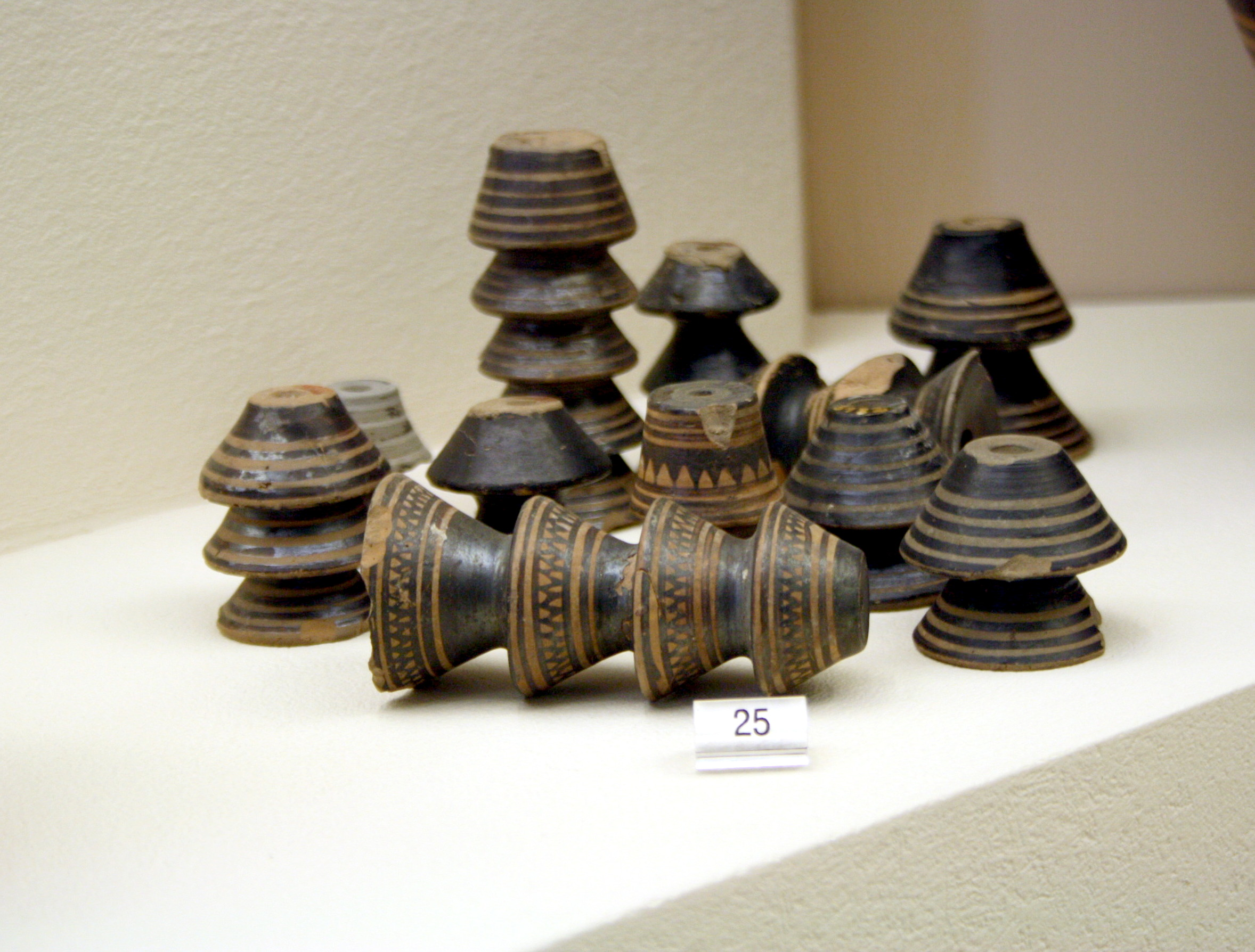
Ancient Greek spindle whorls, 10th century BC, Kerameikos Archaeological Museum, Athens

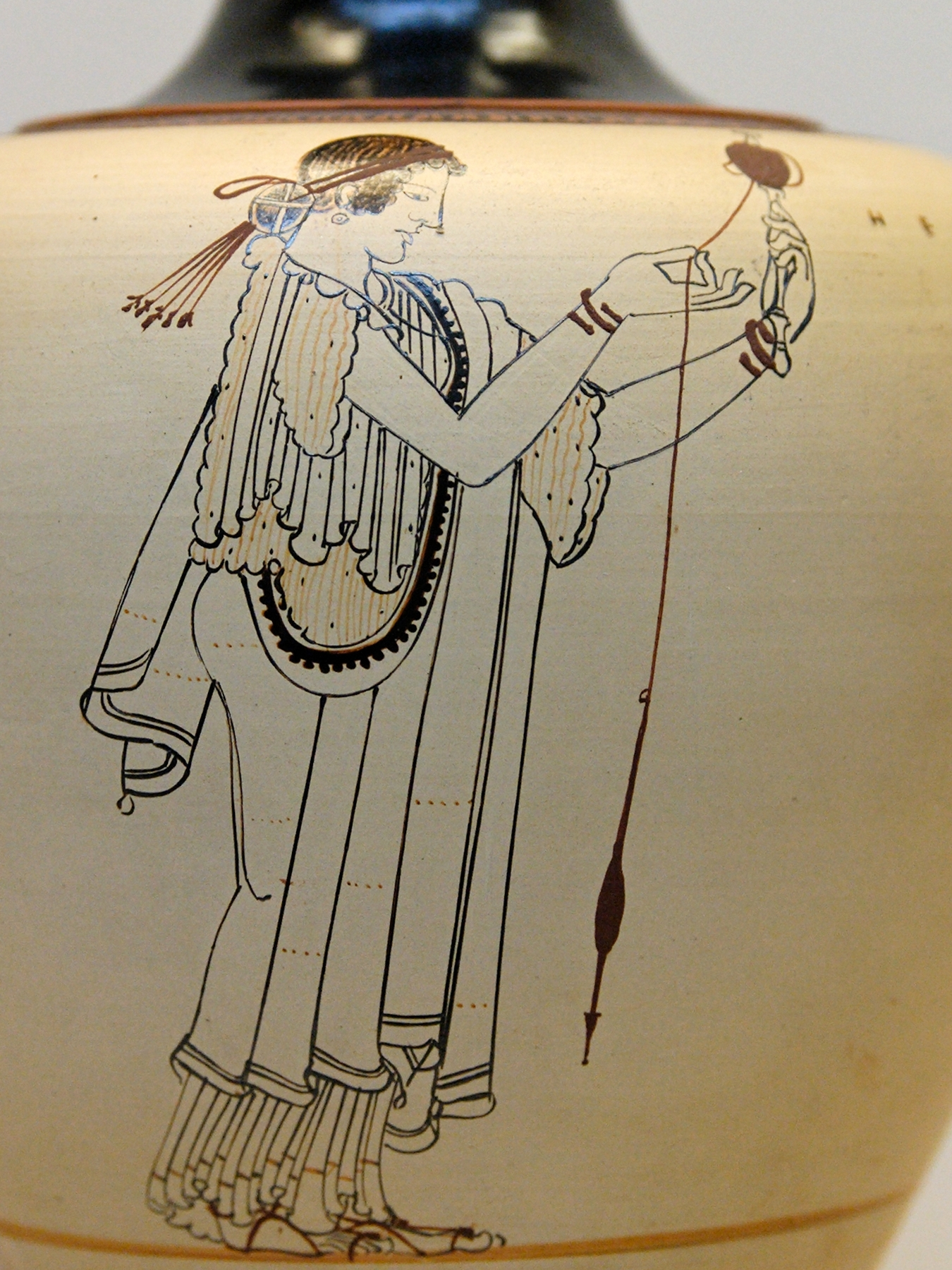
Woman spinning. Detail from an Ancient Greek Attic white-ground oinochoe, c. 490 BC, from Locri, Italy. British Museum, London.

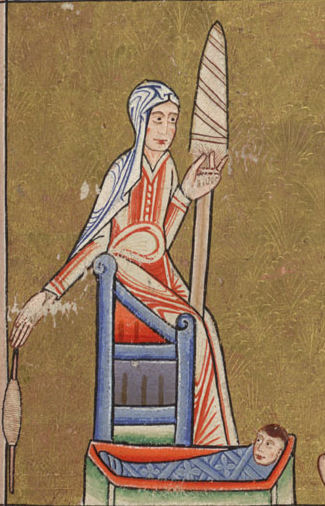
Eve spinning, the spindle in her right hand: Hunterian Psalter, ca 1170 (Glasgow University Library)

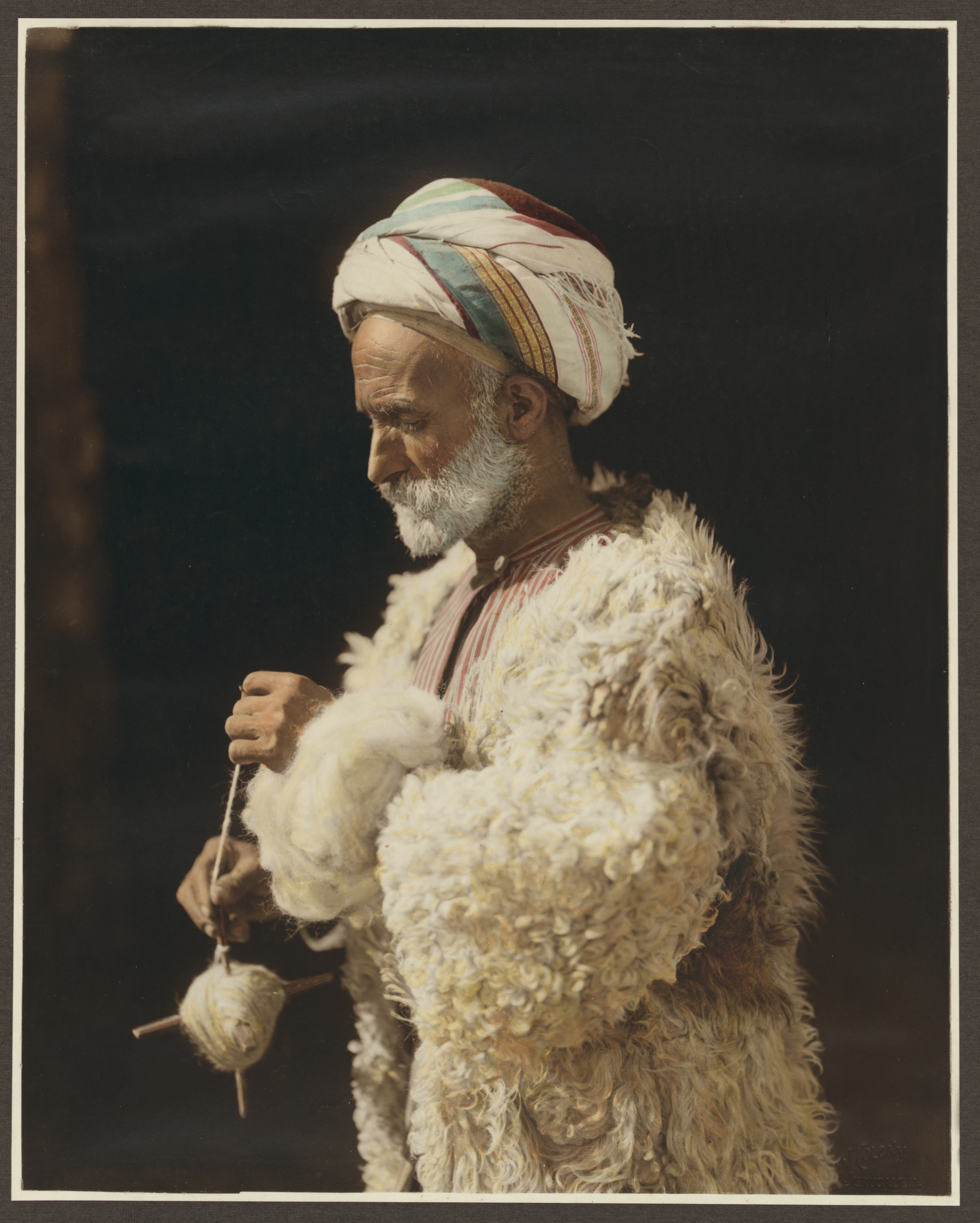
Ramallah man spinning wool

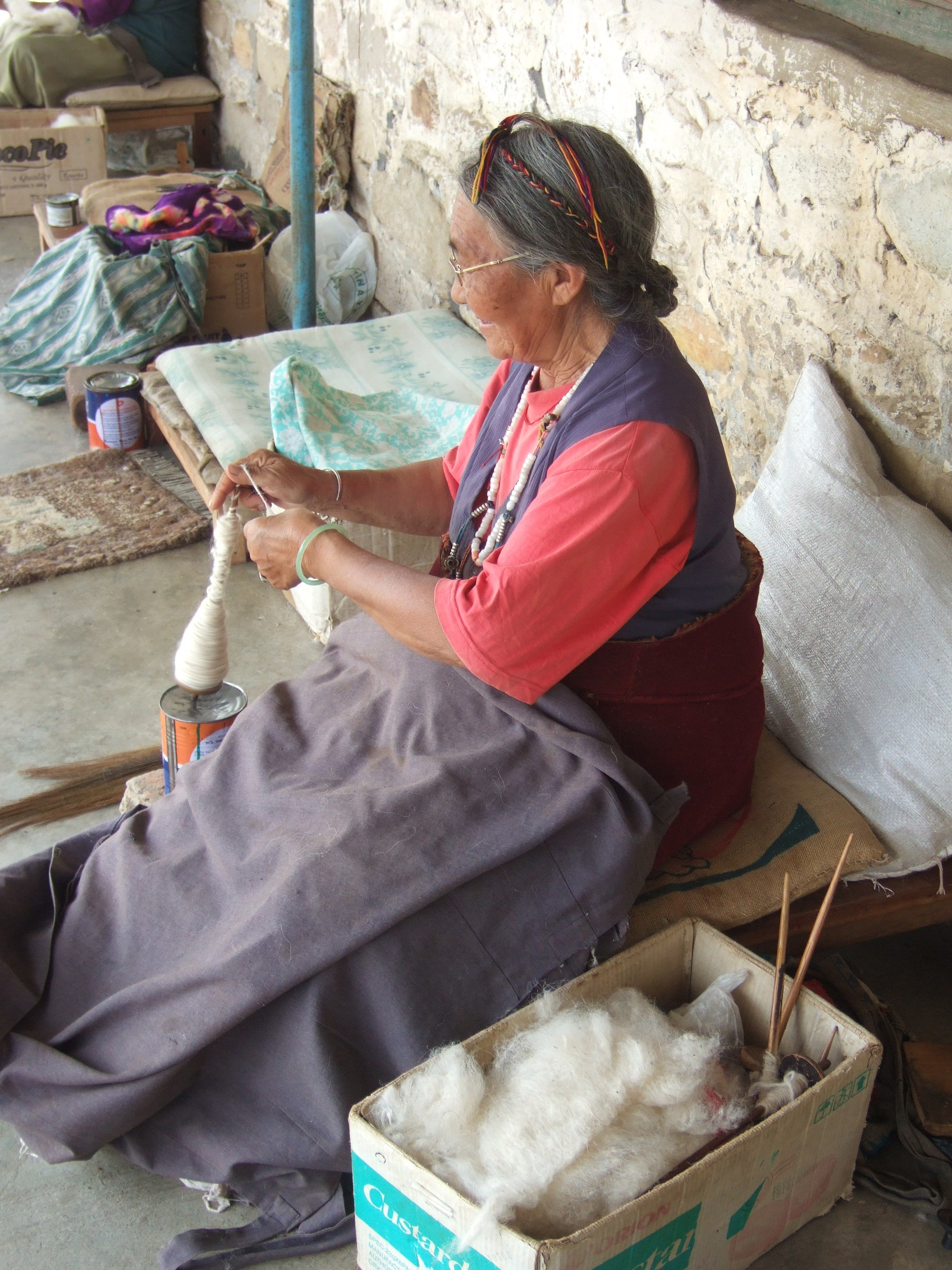
A Tibetan woman spinning wool in Pokhara, Nepal

== See also ==
- Hand spinning
- Spinning wheel
- Timeline of clothing and textiles technology
