= Spindle whorl =

Weighted object fitted to a spindle

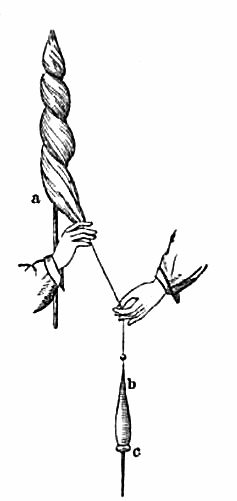
Spinning with a whorl (c) on a spindle (b) and distaff (a) (above)

A spindle whorl is a weighted object fitted to a spindle to help maintain the spindle's speed of rotation while spinning yarn.

== History ==
A spindle whorl may be a disk or spherical object. It is typically positioned on the bottom of the spindle. The spinner spins the weighted spindle pulling off a mass of fibers which is twisted into yarn.

Historically, whorls have been made of materials like amber, antler, bone, ceramic, coral, glass, stone, metal (iron, lead, lead alloy), and wood (oak). Local sourced materials have been also used, such as chalk, limestone, mudstone, sandstone, slate, lydite and soapstone.

Natufian artifacts unearthed in Israel at Nahal Ein Gev II, an archaeological site, are believed to be the oldest spindle whorls found to date. Archaeologists say the perforated pebbles found scattered at the village site are 12,000 years old. According to scans of the pebbles, the perforations were biconical in shape and drilled in two directions, creating an hourglass shape.

== Gallery ==
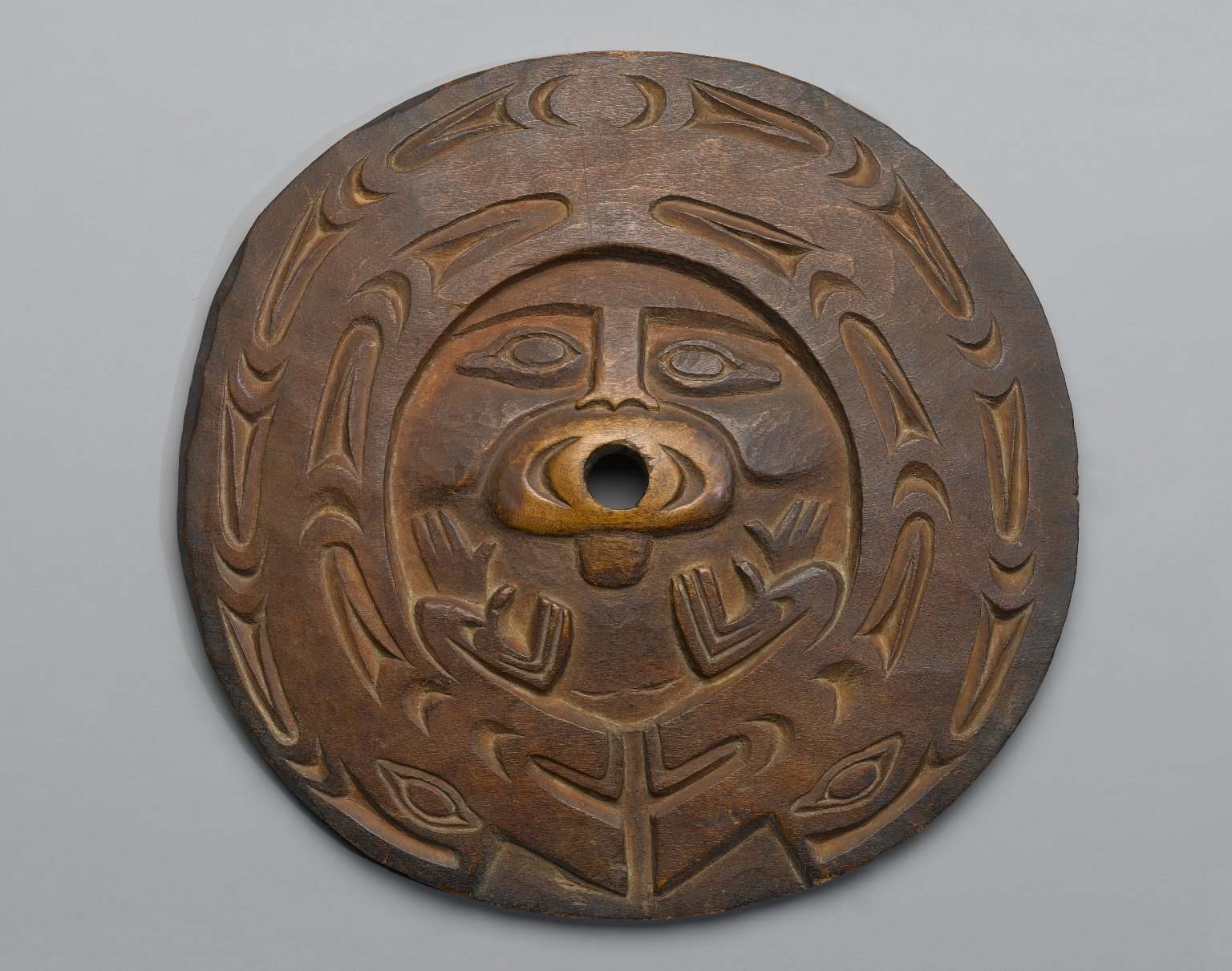
Spindle whorl (Sulsultin), Chemainus, Coast Salish (Native American), 19th century, Brooklyn Museum

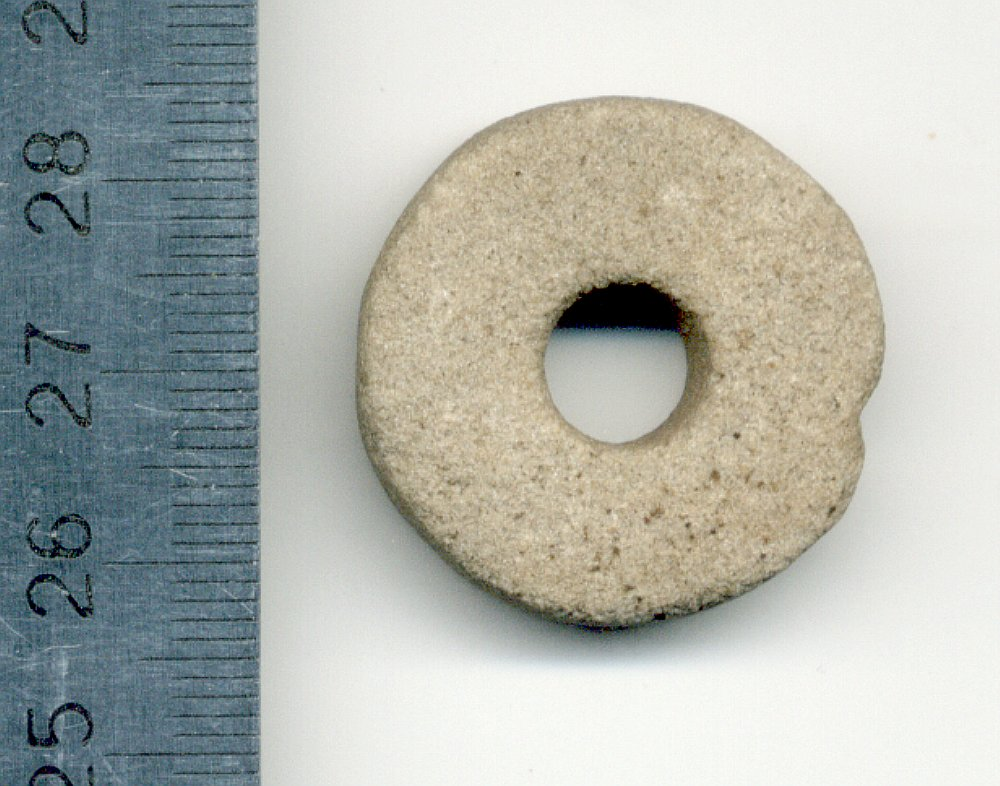
Whorl (12th or 13th century) found in Poland

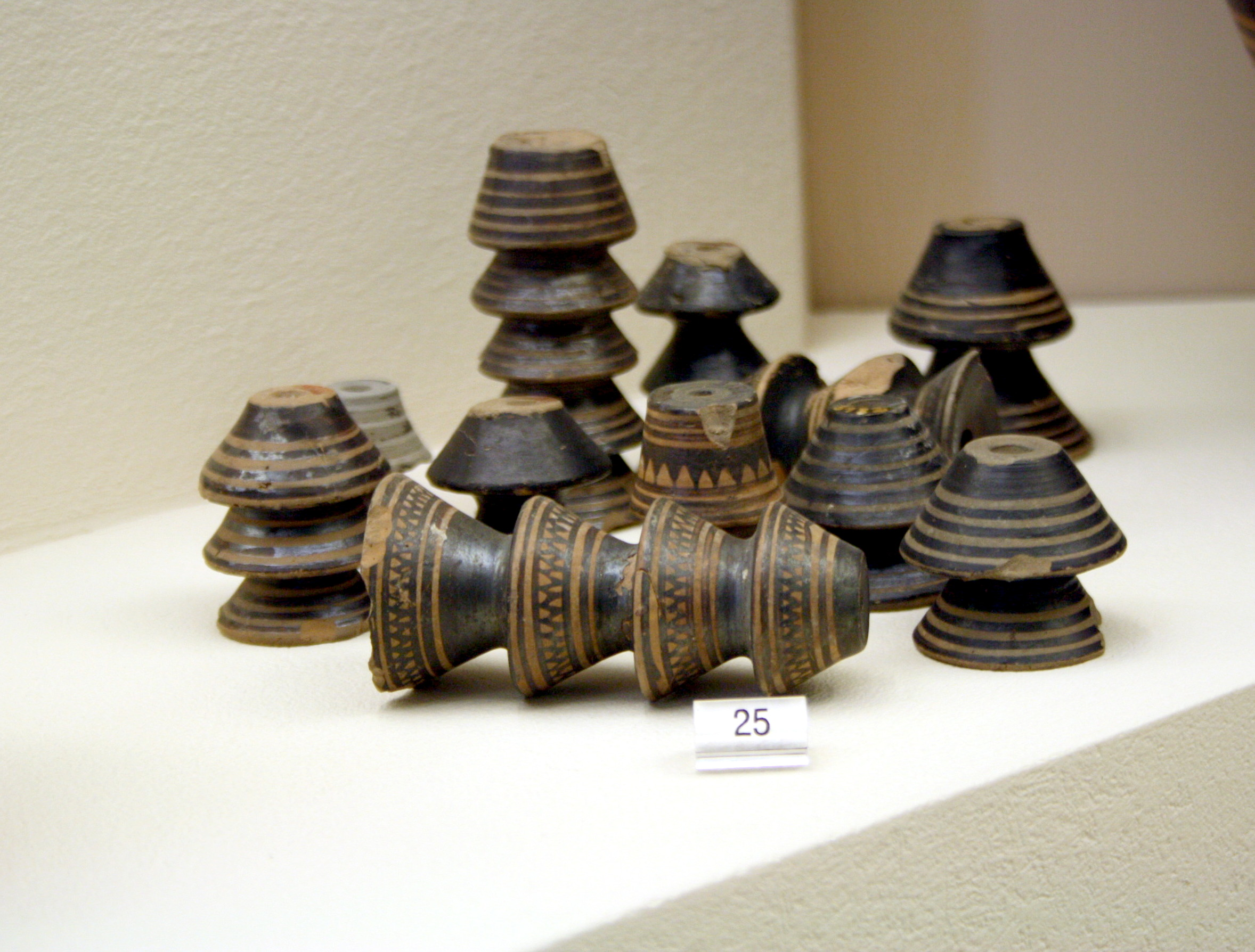
Ancient Greek spindle whorls, 10th century BC, Kerameikos Archaeological Museum, Athens

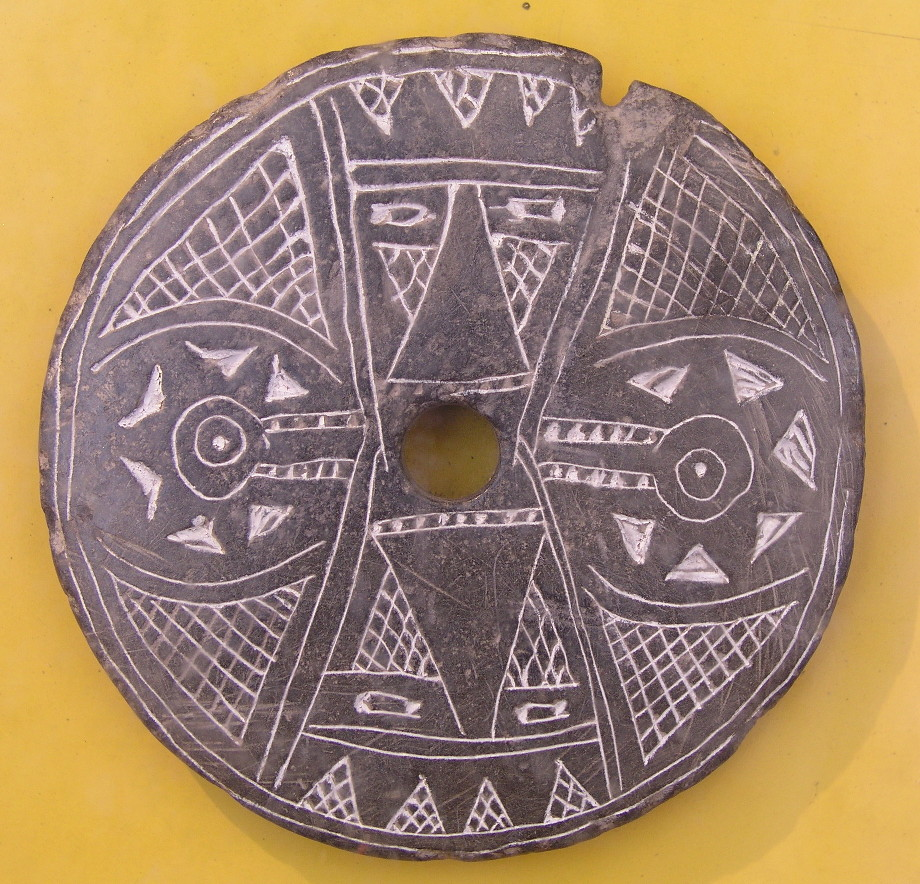
Muisca spindle whorl (500–1500 AD), Archaeology Museum, Sogamoso, Colombia

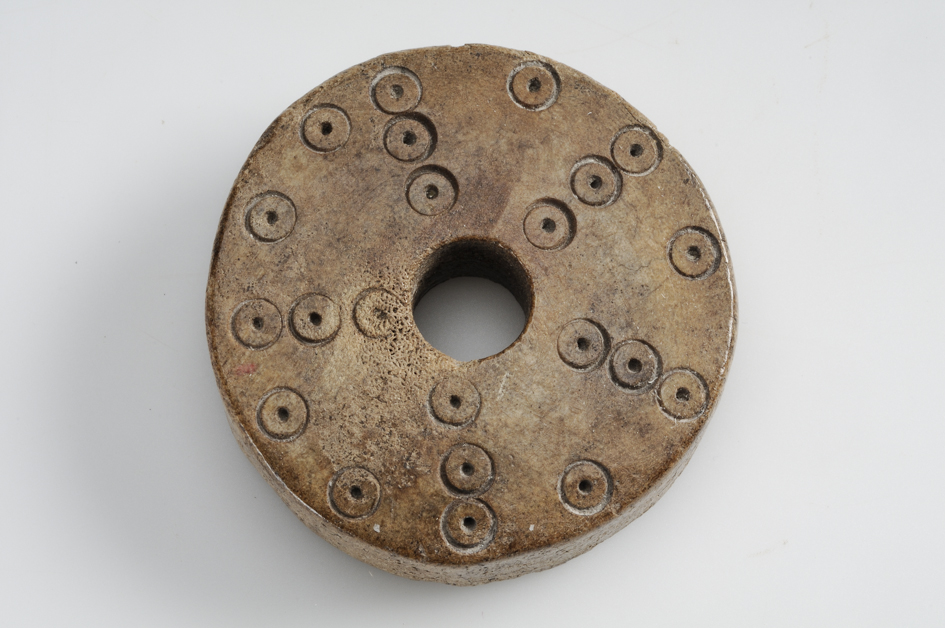
Whorl made of antler, Viking Age (793–1066 AD), Björkö, Sweden

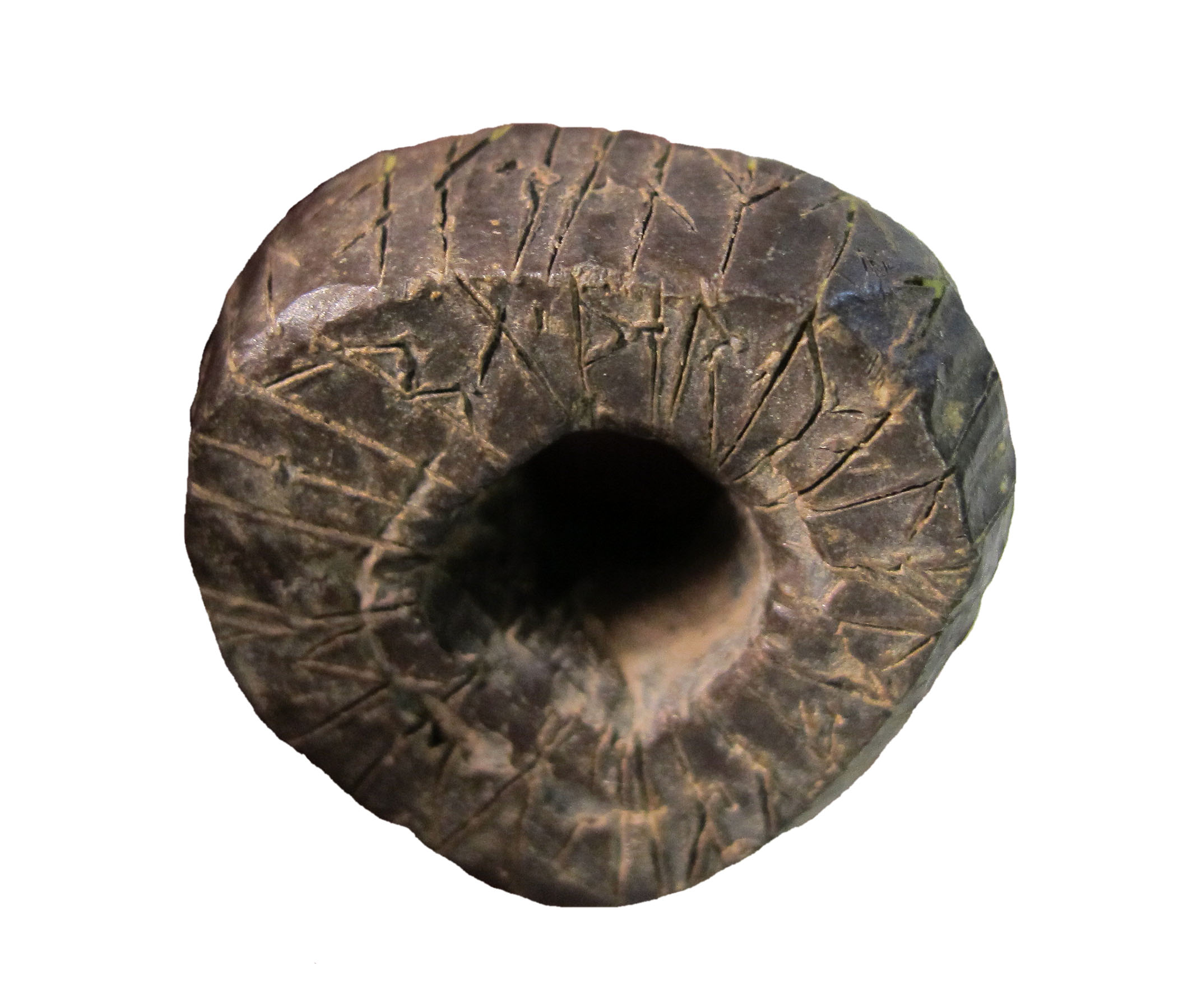
Saltfleetby spindle-whorl (10th–12th centuries), Lincolnshire, England
