= Aaron Nelson-Moody =

Canadian artist

- Born: 14 April 1967 (age 59); Vancouver, British Columbia
- Known for: Wood carving
- Movement: Coast Salish
- Website: splashingeagle.ca

Aaron "Splash" Nelson-Moody (Tawx'sin Yexwulla, born 14 April 1967) is a Squamish carver working in the Coast Salish tradition. Nelson-Moody's works include the doors to the B.C.-Canada pavilion at the 2006 Winter Olympic Games in Turin. He also creates Coast Salish based jewellery.

Nelson-Moody's Squamish name of Tawx'sin Yexwulla means "Splashing Eagle" giving rise to his nickname of "Splash". He started as a carver, but branched out to jewelry when he looked for local Coast Salish jewelry for his wife but found little, and decided to make it.

Nelson-Moody was commissioned to work on the doors for the Turin Winter Olympics a year before their installation. The doors were made from red cedar. Based on a Coast Salish legend, the doors feature an eagle with a sun rising out.

== See also ==
- List of First Nations people
