= Xwalacktun =

Squamish artist

Xwalacktun, born Rick Harry, is a Squamish and Kwakwaka'wakw sculptor and carver. He was born and raised in Squamish, British Columbia and is known primarily for his wood carvings.

== Background and education ==
Xwalacktun received his name from his father, Pekultn, who was a hereditary chief from the Seymour Creek area of North Vancouver, British Columbia. His mother is Kwakwaka'wakw from Squamish and Alert Bay. Xwalacktun has two children, James (Nexw’Kalus-Xwalacktun) and Austin (Aan’yas) Harry, who are visual and 3D artists respectively.

Xwalacktun studied sculpture at Capilano University and Emily Carr University of Art + Design (then called Capilano College and Emily Carr College of Art, respectively). He graduated from Emily Carr University of Art + Design in 1982.

== Career ==
Xwalacktun primarily creates sculptures and carvings from wood as well as metal, concrete, and rock. His work addresses central themes of healing, growth and raising an awareness of the environment using traditional stories that relate to his own life. He has over 80 carvings displayed in British Columbia schools and other institutions, also directing carving classes in Scotland. For the Vancouver 2010 Winter Olympic Games, he was the first Indigenous artist granted a license to create designs related to the games.

Xwalacktun has worked in various school districts in British Columbia as a cultural instructor, creating carvings with students at the schools he visited. He views this work as an opportunity to give back to the community and as work that supports the reconciliation between Canada and Indigenous nations.

== Awards ==
- 2002 Georgie Award.
- 2005 FANS Award.
- 2012 Order of British Columbia.
- 2013 Queen's Diamond Jubilee Award.
- 2016 BC Achievement Award.
- Arthur G. Hayden Medal at the 31st annual International Bridge Conference Awards in 2021.
