= Nahal Ein Gev II =

Prehistoric archaeological site in northern Israel

Nahal Ein Gev II (NEG II)
- NEG II
- Location in Israel Nahal Ein Gev II (Israel)
- 32.782958°N 35.656261°E
- Periods: Epipalaeolithic Near East
- Cultures: late Natufian culture
- Location: northern Israel
- Region: southwestern slopes of the Golan Heights, Jordan Rift Valley

History
- Built: 12,550-12,000 BP (calibrated)

Nahal Ein Gev II (NEG II) is a prehistoric archaeological site in northern Israel, where a village of the late Natufian culture was discovered. The site is located on the northern terrace of Ein Gev Stream (Hebrew: "Nahal Ein Gev"), about two kilometers east of the Sea of Galilee, on the southern slopes of the Golan Heights. The excavations at the site revealed a Natufian village, which includes a large and complex cemetery, a large number of stone buildings, and unique facilities.

According to three carbon-14 dates, the site dates to a period between 12,550 and 12,000 years before our time (calibrated dates). This dating indicates the association of the site with the late Natufian culture of the Epipaleolithic period, as also appears from the study of the flint tools and other characteristics of the material culture at the site.

The site is important because of its archaeological findings and geographical location. The findings uncovered at the site have distinctly Natufian characteristics, but also have elements reminiscent of the later cultures of the early Neolithic period of the Levant. In the Jordan Valley, along the river's upper and lower course, there are other Natufian sites from the same period, which may reflect a local population in the valley towards the end of the Natufian and the beginning of the Neolithic period. Because of this, Nahal Ein Gev II is a key site for studying the transition from a lifestyle of hunting and gathering that characterizes the Epipaleolithic period, to a life of agriculture and animal husbandry that represents the Neolithic period.

As of 2024, the excavation and research project at the site is continued by an expedition from the Institute of Archaeology of the Hebrew University of Jerusalem (HUJI).

== History of excavation ==
The site was first discovered by Dudi Ben-Ami from Kibbutz Ein Gev, who traveled the area extensively and was responsible for the discovery of many sites. The site was exposed due to the excavation of a military position that faced the Syrian border and created a deep cut where many findings were discovered. In 1973, a test excavation was carried out by Ofer Bar-Yosef. The results of this test were published in an article in 2000. (Note: Bar-Yosef, O. and Belfer-Cohen, A. 2000. "Nahal Ein Gev II - A Late Epi-Paleolithic Site in the Jordan Valley", Mitekufat Haeven - Journal of the Israel Prehistoric Society, 30, pp. 49–71.) The excavations at Nahal Ein Gev II were renewed in 2010 by Leore Grosman from the Hebrew University of Jerusalem, in collaboration with researchers from Israel and abroad and research students.

== Architecture ==
The excavations at the site revealed multiple architectural remains that reflect a complex settlement plan. The architectural remains are mostly large rounded buildings, reaching about 5 meters in diameter and built from a combination of limestone and basalt. In many cases, the buildings were built with two parallel outer walls, and in some cases, flat stones were placed horizontally on top of the inner wall to form a bench. So far 6 buildings have been excavated, and more than 10 are known on the site.

== Flint tools ==
The raw materials for chipping the flint vessels are mainly pebbles originating from the wadi and the banks of the Sea of Galilee. The flint assemblage includes evidence of all the stages of chipping. Most of the fracturing products on the site are lithic flakes, something that characterizes the Natufian culture and the cultures of the Pre-Ceramic Neolithic A period (PPNA) in the region. The percentages of blades and flints are equal in frequency, a characteristic more typical of the Pre-Ceramic Neolithic A industries than of the Epipaleolithic.

The toolkit at the site is characterized by very high proportion of perforators. (Note: Abadi, I., and L. Grosman (2019). "Sickle blade technology in the Late Natufian of the Southern Levant", p. 301. In Near Eastern Lithic Technologies on the Move. Interactions and Contexts in Neolithic Traditions, edited by L. Astruc, C. McCartney, F. Briois, and V. Kassianidou. Nicosia: Astrom Editions Limited. PDF via researchgate.net. Retrieved 8 Febr 2025.)

== Craft specialization ==
Rich assemblages of unique art and craft items were discovered at the site, for example jewelry, limestone tools as well as stone and bone tools with engravings. The amount of beads, together with the assemblage of drilling tools and other drilled items, show an extensive jewelry manufacturing industry.

=== Beads ===
Many of the jewelry are disk beads or cylindrical-shaped beads made of a wide variety of materials, but mostly seashells. The disk beads are usually made of Cardium oysters that originate from the Mediterranean Sea and a geological outcrop near the site. Production waste and beads in various stages of production and processing were discovered on the site, which indicates that the beads were produced locally. Similar assemblages of disc beads were discovered in Eynan and Huzuk Musa, also late Natufian sites in the Jordan Valley (the former north of NEG II and the Sea of Galilee, and the latter about halfway down toward the Dead Sea).

=== Art ===
Over 20 intact and broken pieces of art were discovered at the site. The collection of art items includes bone items with engravings, stone items with unique engravings, as well as a rare find: a human face sculpted in a pebble. (Note: Grosman, L., Shaham, D., Valletta, F. Abadi, I., Goldgeier, H., Klein, N., Dubreuil, L. & Munro, N.D., 2017 "A human face carved on a pebble from the Late Natufian site of Nahal Ein Gev II", Antiquity, 91(358), Cambridge University Press, 8 August 2017. PDF (free access). Retrieved 8 Febr 2025.) The jewelry and art pieces discovered in Nahal Ein Gav II reflect local styles, with aspects unique to the site. The pieces of art share many characteristics with findings from the early Natufian culture, but they also have stylistic characteristics in common with the art of the early Neolithic cultures. (Note: Shaham, D., and L. Grosman (2019). "Engraved stones from Nahal Ein Gev II – portraying a local style, forming cultural links". In Near Eastern Lithic Technologies on the Move. Interactions and Contexts in Neolithic Traditions, edited by L. Astruc, C. McCartney, F. Briois, and V. Kassianidou. Nicosia: Astrom Editions Limited.)

=== Lime plaster production ===
The excavations at Nahal Ein Gev II revealed an early instance of innovative technological development: the production of high-quality lime plaster in large quantities. Lime plaster, in different qualities and production methods, is generally known from the Pre-Ceramic Neolithic period in the Levant. After research the production sequence of the plaster at the site was reconstructed. (Note: Friesem, D. E., Abadi, I., Shaham, D. & Grosman, L. (2019). "Lime plaster cover of the dead 12,000 years ago – new evidence for the origins of lime plaster technology", Evolutionary Human Sciences 1, Cambridge University Press)

=== Spindle whorls ===
Remains of spindle whorls found at the from 12,000 years ago might be the oldest spindle whorls found to date.

== Diet ==
The assemblage of animal bones in Nahal Ein Gev II reflects increased exploitation of the natural environments in the Jordan Valley and the southern Golan. The intensive hunting methods are reflected in the exploitation of a wide variety of species, an abundance of small animal species (turtles and rabbits), and an emphasis on hunting young antelopes. On the site, there is also plenty of evidence of the exploitation of animals from the nearby water sources (fish and waterfowl).

== Burials ==
Burials in close proximity to living spaces, and in particular associated with ruined and abandoned houses, is a new development and a peculiarity of the Natufian culture, interpreted as showing a lack of separation between the living and the dead in a society that gave up on much of its mobility and set roots in a specific territory.

Burials were found in several areas of the site, but the most significant concentration is in building 5, to the north of the site.

In building 3, a single burial of a woman was found under the wall of the building, which was probably already abandoned at the time of her burial. The burial place was carefully chosen and included dismantling the stone wall, placing the body, and rebuilding the wall. The woman's burial position was very compressed, which raises the possibility that the body was bound or wrapped in organic material during the burial.

A large and complex cemetery was discovered in building 5. At least four burials were uncovered in a burial pit excavated in the test section. At the base of the pit, a young woman was buried in a contracted position. Around her whole body, and especially under her head, there was a hard white substance, which indicates that when she was buried she was covered with lime plaster. The bones of two other burials were found scattered around the burial.

Many other burials were found in burial pits dug into the layer of plaster that covers the entire area of the cemetery. These pits constitute the second stage of burials in the structure. So far, the excavations have made it possible to define the boundaries of the plaster layer that covers the entire burial area and approaches the monumental wall of Building 5. The full extent of the cemetery and the depth of the layers in it are not yet fully known.
