= Charles Thurstan Shaw =

English archaeologist (1914–2013)

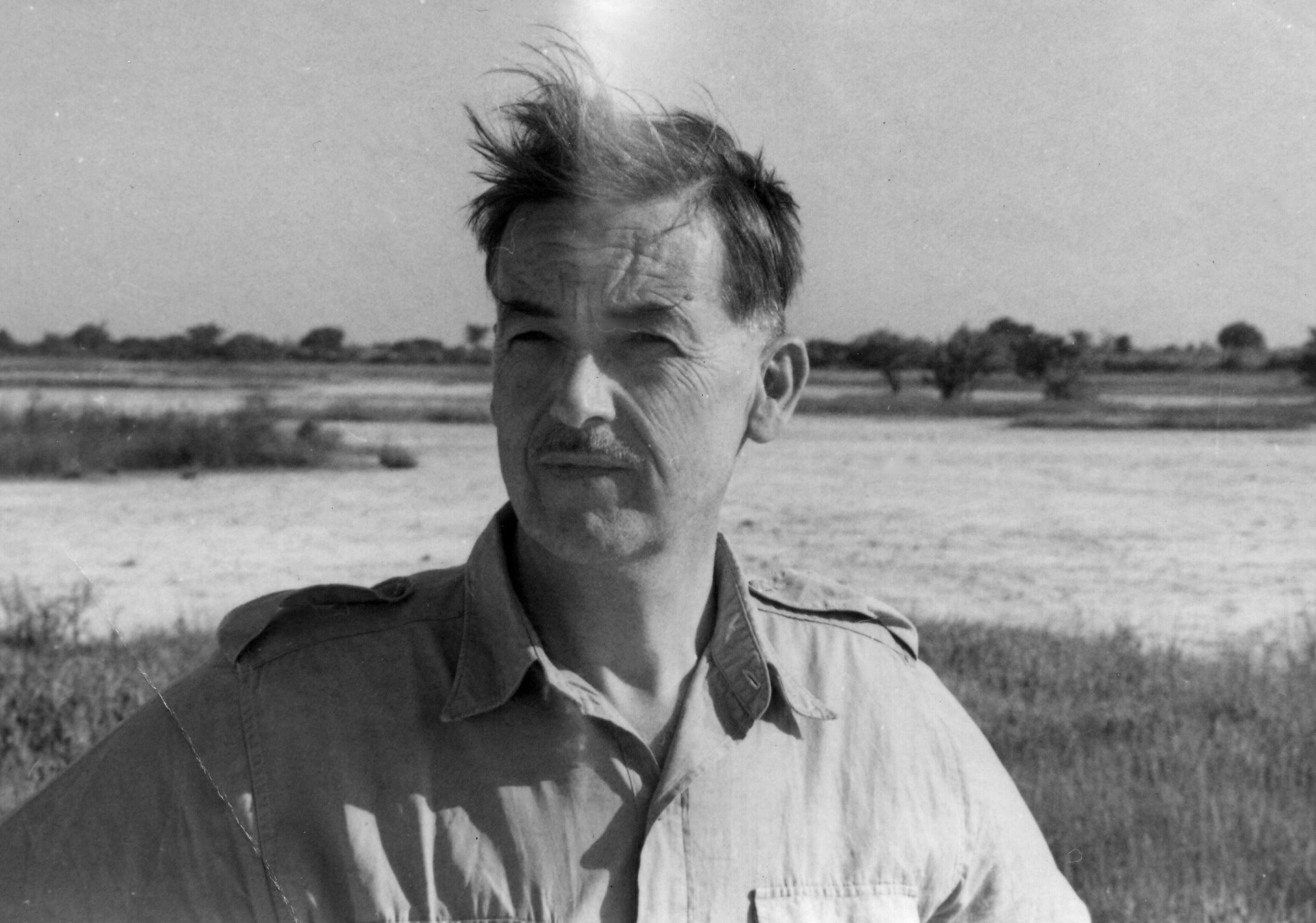
- Thurstan Shaw, Senegal, 1967
- Born: 27 June 1914; Plymouth, England
- Died: 8 March 2013 (aged 98)
- Occupation: Archaeologist
- Known for: Archaeology of Igbo-Ukwu
- Notable work: Igbo-Ukwu Volume I & II
- Spouses: Iona Magor (m. 1939; died 1992); Pamela Jane Smith (m. 2004)
- Children: 5
- Relatives: Julian Gough (grandson)

Chief Charles Thurstan Shaw CBE FBA FSA (27 June 1914 – 8 March 2013) was an English archaeologist, the first trained specialist to work in what was then British West Africa. He specialized in the ancient cultures of present-day Ghana and Nigeria. He helped establish academic institutions, including the Ghana National Museum and the archaeology department at the University of Ghana. He began working with the University of Ibadan in 1960, where he later founded and developed its archaeology department. He led this for more than 10 years before his retirement in 1974.

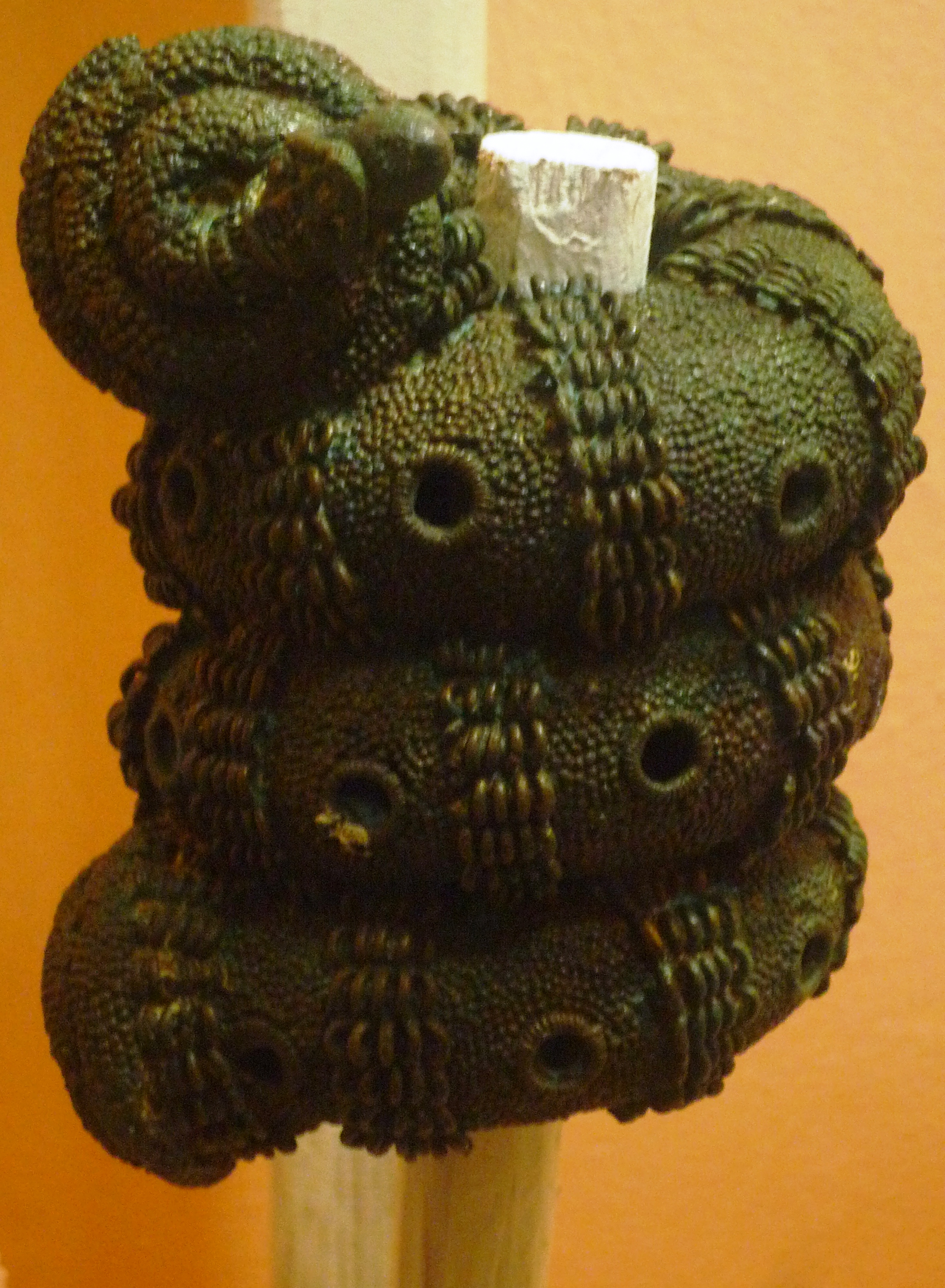
9th-century bronze ornament excavated by Charles Thurstan Shaw at Igbo-Ukwu

Shaw's excavations at Igbo-Ukwu, Nigeria, revealed a 9th-century indigenous culture that created sophisticated work in bronze metalworking, independent of any Arab or European influence and centuries before other sites that were better known at the time of discovery. He was awarded the C.B.E. in 1972 for his contributions. In 1989, he was made a tribal chief in Nigeria.

In addition, Shaw worked on expanding communications about African archaeology; in 1964, he founded the West African Archaeological Newsletter, which he edited until 1970; from 1971 to 1975, he edited the West African Journal of Archaeology.

== Early life and education ==
Born in Plymouth, England, Thurstan Shaw was the second son of Reverend John Herbert Shaw, an Anglican priest, and Grace Irene Woollatt. He was educated at Blundell's School in Tiverton. He studied Classics at Sidney Sussex College, Cambridge, where he added Archeology. Shaw received a B.A (1st class) in 1936 and was awarded an M.A. in 1941.

== Early academic career ==
Shaw was encouraged by Louis Leakey to go to the Gold Coast (later Ghana) to work in archaeology. He arrived on 15 September 1937 and started as a tutor with the Cambridge Education Committee. He was appointed Curator of the Anthropology Museum at Achimota College, holding that post until 1945. During this time he conducted the first archaeological excavations in Ghana at Dawu near Accra. He served at the Cambridge Institute of Education from 1951 to 1964.

During the 1950s, Shaw helped found and organize the collections of the Ghana National Museum and establish the archaeology department at the University of Ghana. These were part of the national institutions being developed as Ghana moved toward revived independence. They supported the study and preservation of the nation's rich heritage within its borders.

== Excavations of Igbo-Ukwu ==
In 1959, Shaw was invited by the antiquities department of Nigeria to perform an excavation at Igbo-Ukwu, where numerous ancient bronzes had been found by a villager. Igbo-Ukwu is near the ancient town of Onitsha in Eastern Nigeria. Shaw's excavation revealed bronze pieces that were evidence of a sophisticated Igbo civilization from the ninth century. They marked the most-developed metalworking culture of the time. The Igbo were working at this site centuries before the development of other bronze-working sites in what is now Nigeria.

Shaw returned to the town in 1964 and conducted two more excavations. These revealed extensive bronzes, as well as thousands of trade beads, evidence of a commercial network extending to Egypt. He also found evidence of ritual practices related to burials and sacred sites.

Over fifty years later, and inspired by his wife Pamela Jane Smith, Shaw's work in Igbo-Ukwu is being revisited and expanded by a team of archaeologists from the University of Nigeria and the University of Cambridge, led by Kingsley Daraojimba.

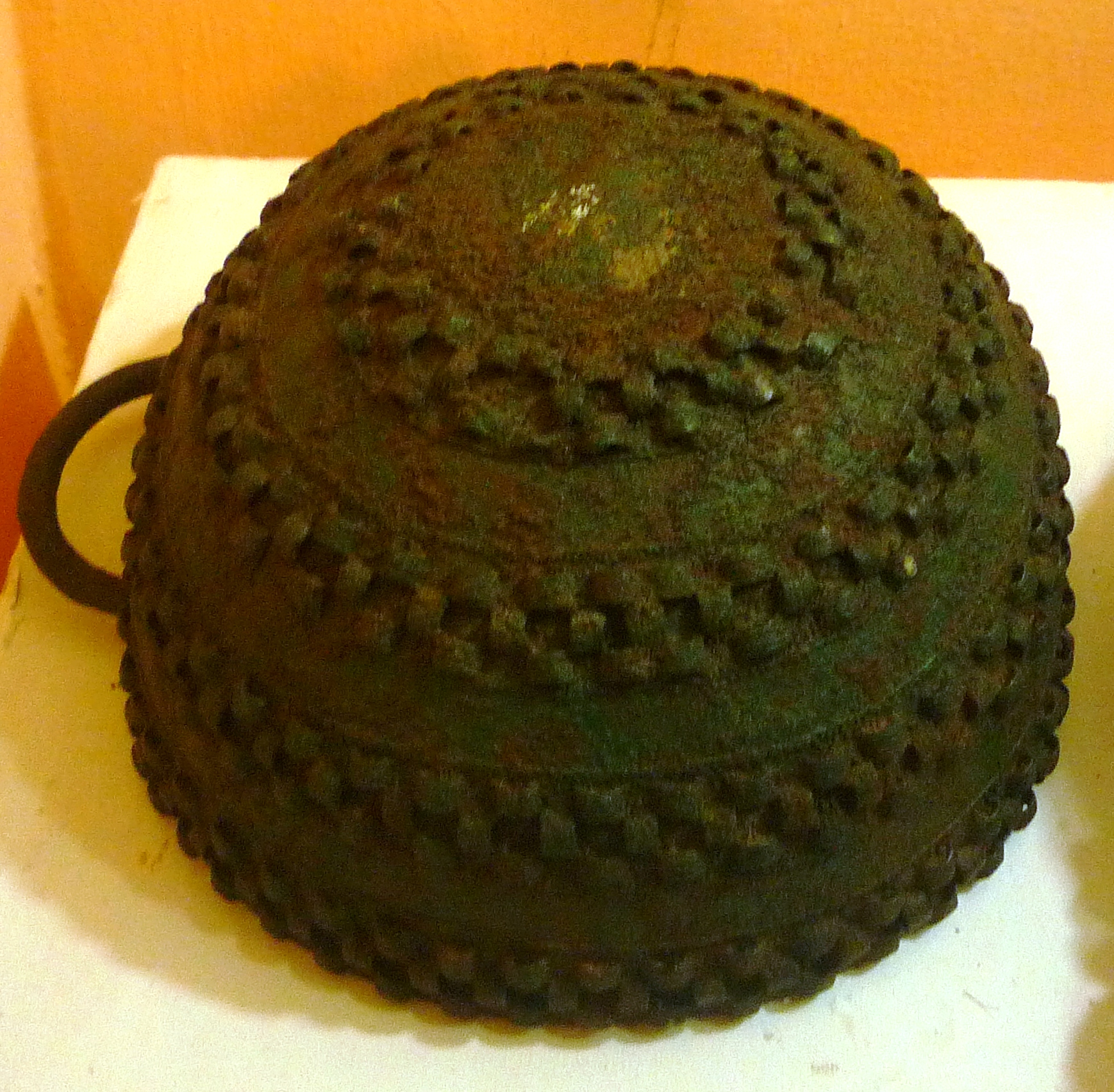
9th century bronze pot excavated by Shaw at Igbo-Ukwu

== Later years ==
In 1960 Shaw joined the University of Ibadan, Nigeria, where in 1963 he became Research Professor of Archaeology. He established the department of archeology, training talented archeologists, and leading the department until his retirement in 1974. Based on an assessment of his published work, Cambridge awarded Shaw a PhD in 1968.

From 1964 to 1970, Shaw was founder and editor of the West African Archaeological Newsletter. He edited the West African Journal of Archaeology from 1971 to 1975. He wrote under both the name Thurstan Shaw and the pen name of Peter Woods. He was President of the PanAfrican Archaeological Association from 1971 to 1977.

He returned to England from Africa in 1976 when appointed Director of Studies in Archaeology and Anthropology at Magdalene College, Cambridge. He served in that position until retirement in 1979.

== Personal life ==
In 1939 he married Ione Magor, and they had two sons and three daughters together; his many grandchildren include Julian Gough, who also went to Sidney Sussex. Ione died in 1992. In 2004 he married Pamela Jane Smith, a historian of archaeology.

Shaw was a pacifist, and in 1960 became an active and widely respected Quaker. He participated in anti-war activities. At the World Archeology Conference in 1986, he took part in a boycott against South African academics as an anti-apartheid measure.

After returning to England, Shaw was active in walking groups. He founded the Icknield Way Association to reopen and restore the prehistoric path from Norfolk to Wiltshire.

A brief, affectionate and informative account, with a photograph, of Shaw as an undergraduate appears in the June 1936 issue of the Sidney Sussex magazine, The Pheon.

== Death ==
Shaw died on 8 March 2013.

== Legacy and honours ==
- In 1972, Shaw was awarded the C.B.E. for his contributions.
- In 1989, he was awarded the chieftaincy titles of the Onuna Ekwulu of Nri and the Onyafuonka of Igboland at an international conference in Ibadan on his 75th birthday.
- In 2010, he was recognized at the World Archaeological Congress on the occasion of his 96th birthday.

== Bibliography ==
- The Study of Africa's Past (1946)
- Shaw, Thurstan (1961). Excavations at Dawu. Report on an Excavation in a Mound at Dawu, Akuapim, Ghana. Thomas Nelson & Sons.
- Igbo-Ukwu : An Account of Archaeological Discoveries in Eastern Nigeria (1970/1977 paperback edition)
- Discovering Nigeria's Past (1975)
- Unearthing Igbo-Ukwū: Archaeological Discoveries in Eastern Nigeria (1977)
- Shaw, Thurstan (1978). Nigeria : its archaeology and early history. London: Thames and Hudson. ISBN 0500020868.
- The Archaeology of Africa: Food, Metals and Towns (1995)

== See also ==
- Archaeology of Igbo-Ukwu
