= Archaeology of Igbo-Ukwu =

Archaeology done in the town of Igbo-Ukwu, Nigeria

Igbo-Ukwu
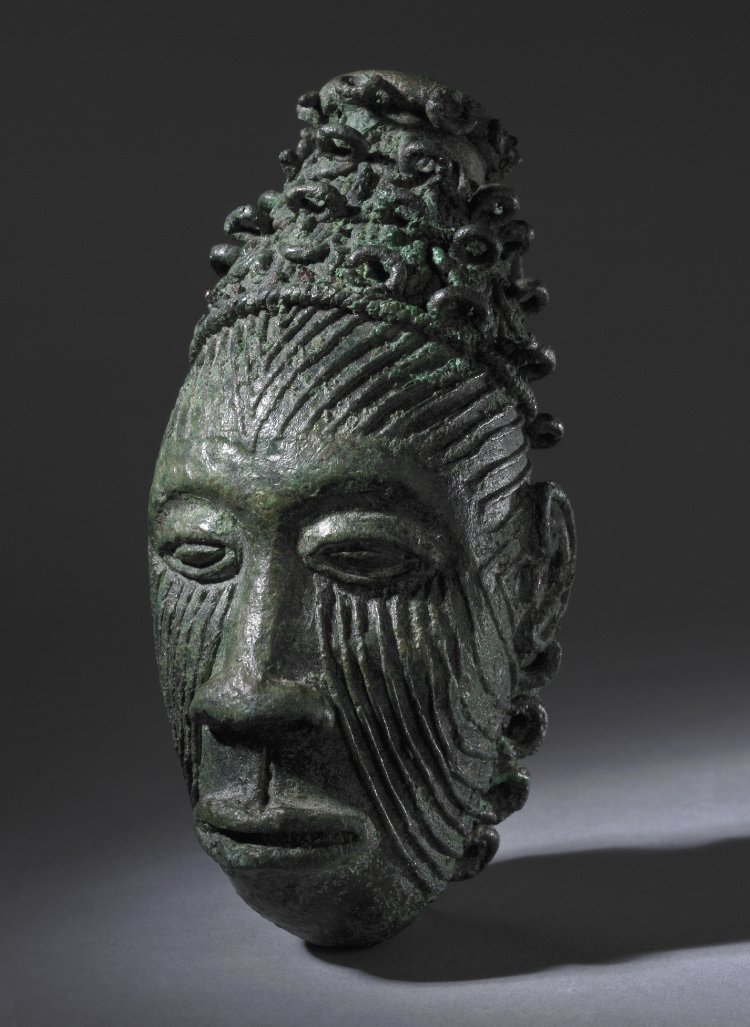
- Igbo-Ukwu face pendant

- Location within Nigeria
- 6°1′N 7°1′E
- Cultures: Igbo culture
- Associated with: Igbo people
- Location: Igbo-Ukwu, Anambra State, Nigeria

History
- Built: Unknown, but prior to 1000 AD
- Built by: Kingdom of Nri

Site notes
- Excavation dates: 1959, 1964
- Archaeologists: Thurstan Shaw

The archaeology of Igbo-Ukwu is the study of an archaeological site located in a town of the same name: Igbo-Ukwu, an Igbo town in Anambra State in southeastern Nigeria. As a result of these findings, three excavation areas at Igbo-Ukwu were opened in 1959 and 1964 by Charles Thurstan Shaw: Igbo Richard, Igbo Isaiah, and Igbo Jonah. Excavations revealed more than 700 high quality artifacts of copper, bronze and iron, as well as about 165,000 glass, carnelian and stone beads, pottery, textiles and ivory beads, cups, and horns. The bronzes include numerous ritual vessels, pendants, crowns, breastplates, staff ornaments, swords, and fly-whisk handles.

== Impact on art history ==
Peter Garlake compares the Igbo-Ukwu bronzes "to the finest jewelry of rococo Europe or of Carl Faberge", and William Buller Fagg states they were created with "a strange rococo almost Faberge type virtuosity". Frank Willett says that the Igbo-Ukwu bronzes portray a standard that is comparable to that established by Benvenuto Cellini five hundred years later in Europe. Denis Williams calls them "an exquisite explosion without antecedent or issue". One of the objects found, a water pot set in a mesh of simulated rope is described by Hugh Honour and John Fleming as:

A virtuoso feat of cire perdue (lost wax) casting. Its elegant design and refined detailing are matched by a level of technical accomplishment that is notably more advanced than European bronze casting of this period.

The high technical proficiency and lack of known prototypes of the Igbo-Ukwu bronzes led to initial speculation in the academic community that they must have been created after European contact and phantom voyagers were postulated. However research and isotope analysis has established that the source of the metals is of local origin and radio carbon dating has confirmed a 9th-century date, long before the earliest contact with Europe. The Igbo-Ukwu artifacts did away with the hitherto existing colonial era opinions in archeological circles that such magnificent works of art and technical proficiency could only originate in areas with contact to Europe, or that they could not be crafted in an acephalous or egalitarian society such as that of the Igbo. Some of the glass and carnelian beads have been found to be produced in Old Cairo at the workshops of Fustat thus establishing that a long-distance trade system extending from Igbo Ukwu to Byzantine-era Egypt existed. Archaeological sites containing iron smelting furnaces and slag have been excavated dating to 2000 BCE in Lejja and 750 BCE in Opi, both in the Nsukka region about 100 kilometers east of Igbo-Ukwu.

== Discovery ==
The initial finds were made by Isaiah Anozie while digging in his compound in 1938. He was not aware of the significance of the objects he had found and gave away some of them to friends and neighbors, as well as using some of the vessels to water his goats. Several months later, J.O. Field, the British colonial district officer of the area, learned of the finds and purchased many of them, publishing the finds in an anthropological journal. In 1946, he handed over the artifacts to the Nigerian Department of Antiquities. Other bronze artifacts found in Anozie's compound were collected by Surveyor of Antiquities Kenneth Murray in 1954. From 1959 to 1964, under approval of the Nigerian Department of Antiquities and the University of Ibadan, Thurstan Shaw and his team excavated three areas: Igbo Isaiah, around the original find, as well as Igbo Richard and Igbo Jonah. The archaeological digs revealed hundreds of copper and bronze ritual vessels as well as iron swords, iron spearheads, iron razors and other artifacts dated a millennium earlier.

Following a 2014 memorial for Shaw, Igwe of Igbo-Ukwu Martin E. Ezeh granted permission for new fieldwork at Igbo-Ukwu. New plans for exploration of the site were coordinated by Shaw's wife, Pamela Jane Smith Shaw, in 2019 and 2021. Fieldwork on this project aimed at expanding the temporal and spatial record of the ancient settlement. Archaeologists further excavated Igbo Richard, Igbo Isaiah, and Igbo Jonah, discovering an assemblage of large ceramic pottery and evidence of cultural deposits.

== Overview of Site Layout and Findings ==
The Igbo-Ukwu site is located approximately 366 meters above sea level on a ridge Nanka sands of the Ameki formation characterized by an uneven topography of sandstones and ironstones; the area is mostly deprived of groundwater and surrounded by the Aghomili River in the east and the Obizi River in the west. The artifacts revealed in the 1960–1964 excavations by Thurstan Shaw are situated 40–70 cm (16–28 in) below the surface in Igbo Isaiah, and 1.75–2.5 m (5.7–8.2 ft) in Igbo Richard. The third and last unit excavated, Igbo Jonah, was the largest (19 x 11m), yet it produced the smallest amount of artifact material. The depth of the artifacts at Igbo Jonah is varied; the pits were filled in antiquity, resulting in a complex depositional history. The depth of the artifacts at Igbo Jonah is varied; the pits were deliberately backfilled resulting in different degrees of orderly deposition. Bronze, copper and glass artifacts at Igbo Isaiah lay below a compound wall which had to be removed before the excavation. Additionally, there are features (likely tree stumps) filled with small pieces of pottery. The Igbo Richard site contained human remains from several individuals, beaded wristlets and anklets, and a wooden stool which has been associated with a single set of human skeletal remains (possibly belonging to a priest-king). The Igbo Jonah site (which produced the least amount of associated archaeological material) produced a significant example of ritual pottery, as well as charcoal, animals bones, and some bronze sculptures. Further excavations in 2019 and 2021 to the west of Igbo Richard yielded deposits of pottery, bronze, copper, iron objects and slags, chalk, bone, and palm kernel.

== Chronology ==
The first radiocarbon dates from Igbo-Ukwu were published by Shaw in 1970 and gave a range of 1075–1110 BP, with a standard error of ±100 and ±150 years, dating the site to the 9th century. The standard deviation of radiocarbon dates was much greater at the time when Shaw published his dates, and more recent advancements in the accuracy of radiocarbon dating have allowed for a more precise range of dates for Igbo-Ukwu. In 2022, Daraojimba et al. found that coal and wood samples from one of the Igbo Ukwu sites, Igbo Isaiah, dated to between the 10th and 13th century. This 10th century dating was further backed by Mcintosh et al.'s study of textiles published in the same year. The new radiocarbon dates open "the possibility that some or all of the Igbo Isaiah bronzes and beads are somewhat younger than previously believed, but certainly pre-date European coastal contact by several centuries. Mcintosh et al. however, state that "These dates do not...narrow the date range for the Igbo Richard burial, or illuminate the key question of its temporal relationship to Igbo Isaiah and Igbo Jonah."...there has been a tendency in the literature to regard the three sites as contemporaneous. However, the new dates reported by Daraojimba et al...suggest that Igbo-Ukwu may have been in use for several centuries.

== Textiles ==
Significant findings have been made in the last 50 years at the Igbo-Ukwu site, especially in textiles. Samples from the British Museum have allowed for new studies of Igbo-Ukwu fabrics, including a scanning electron microscopy analysis of two fabric samples. This study found that the samples, which were uncovered in 1938 at the Igbo Isaiah compound, were woven with yarn that was 0.3–0.4 mm in diameter and weave densities of both 24 warp and 16 weft/cm. These findings follow earlier studies by the Shirley Institute of samples found at the same site, provided by Charles Thurstan Shaw.

The textile samples recovered by Shaw in 1960 (the whereabouts of which are currently unknown) and those recovered by Isaiah Anozie in 1938 (which belong to the British Museum and are the subject of new analyses) were primarily found to be of two distinct fiber types: bast and leaf/grass. Bast fibers were overwhelmingly attributed to Ficus trees, and leaf/grass fibers were chiefly attributed to Raphia palms. The use of these fibers represents an old weaving tradition from the forest zone of Nigeria, and these materials have almost entirely been replaced by cotton and wool today. These textiles have been speculated to hold religious or spiritual significance, but ethnographic and archaeological evidence is sparse in regard to the meaning of forest zone textiles and tree bast fibers. Therefore, the spiritual significance of these textiles remains speculative.

Accelerator mass spectrometry (AMS) dating was performed on one textile sample from Igbo Isaiah, placing the date of textile creation in the 11th -12th century (calibrated to 1027 - 1180AD). While other dating by Shaw place it at 9th - 11th century date previously offered by Shaw on the basis of less precise radiocarbon results and stylistic seriation performed on pottery and bronzes from Igbo-Ukwu. Shaw adopted 9th century based on radiocarbon dating and 7-13th century range consistent with early efforts at dendrochronological calibration.

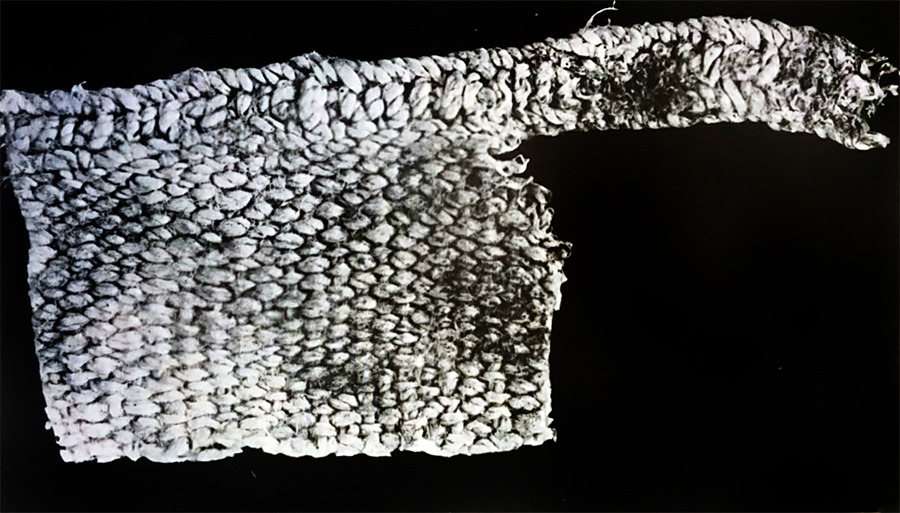
Igbo-ukwu 9th century textile associated with copper chain with weave pattern and selvedge

== Beads ==
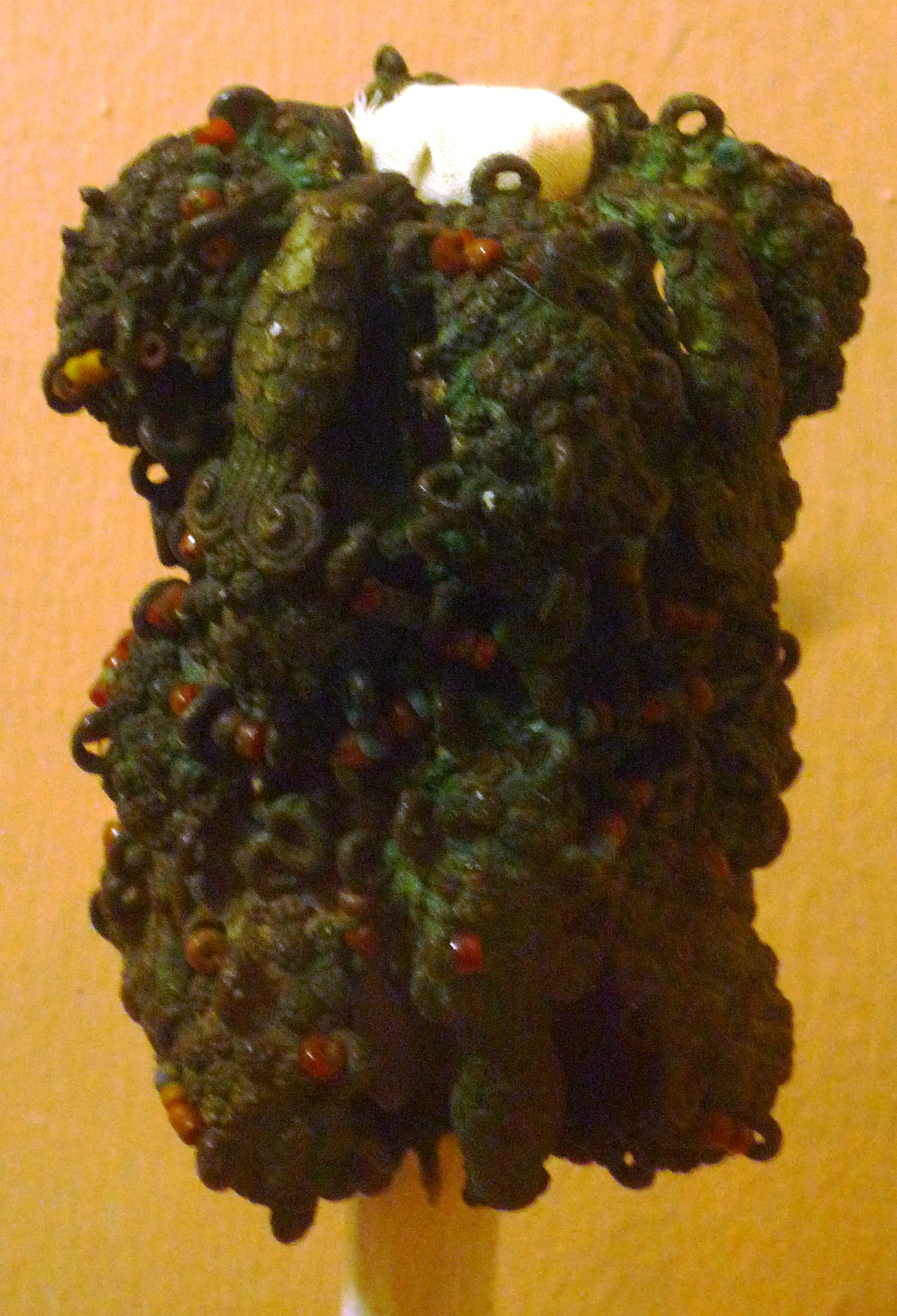
9th century ornamental staff head, 9th century, bronze

Over 165,000 glass and carnelian beads were found at Igbo-Ukwu; the quantity of beads contributes to the site's uniqueness in Western African archaeology. Archaeologists are able to use the morphology and chemical composition of the beads as insight into Igbo-Ukwu participation in long-distance trade networks and a general chronology of interaction. A recent analysis of 138 beads, selected for a range of different types and colors, showed that the most common type of bead analyzed was the soda-lime glass bead produced using plant ash. These were likely made from glass produced in Mesopotamia and eastern regions of Iran, and likely moved along the eastern Niger corridor route by the ninth or tenth centuries. However, several other glass bead chemical compositions have not been traced to a source, such as glass composed of soda-aluminum and soda-lime fluxed with a mineral alkali. Less analysis has been performed for the carnelian beads and Susan McIntosh argues that more research is needed into the possibility of any Saharan trade connections.

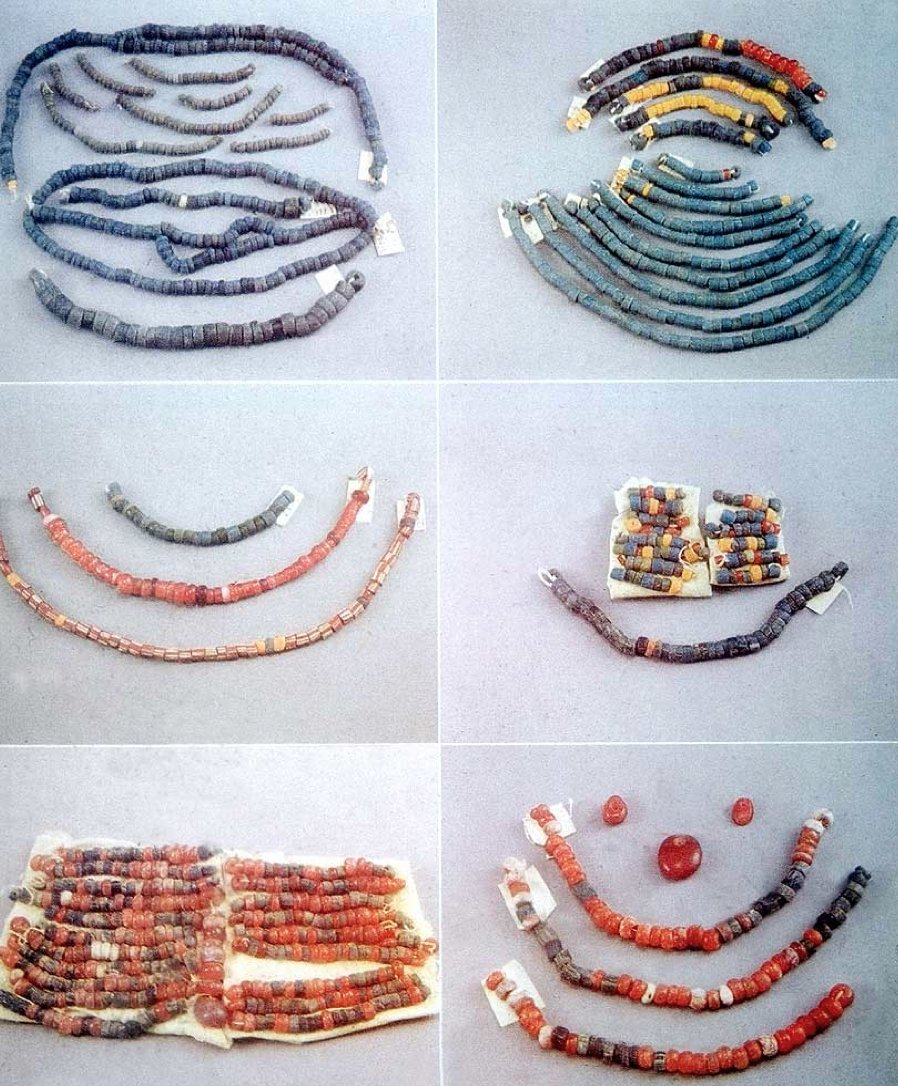
9th-century glass beads from Igbo-Ukwu

== Metallurgy ==
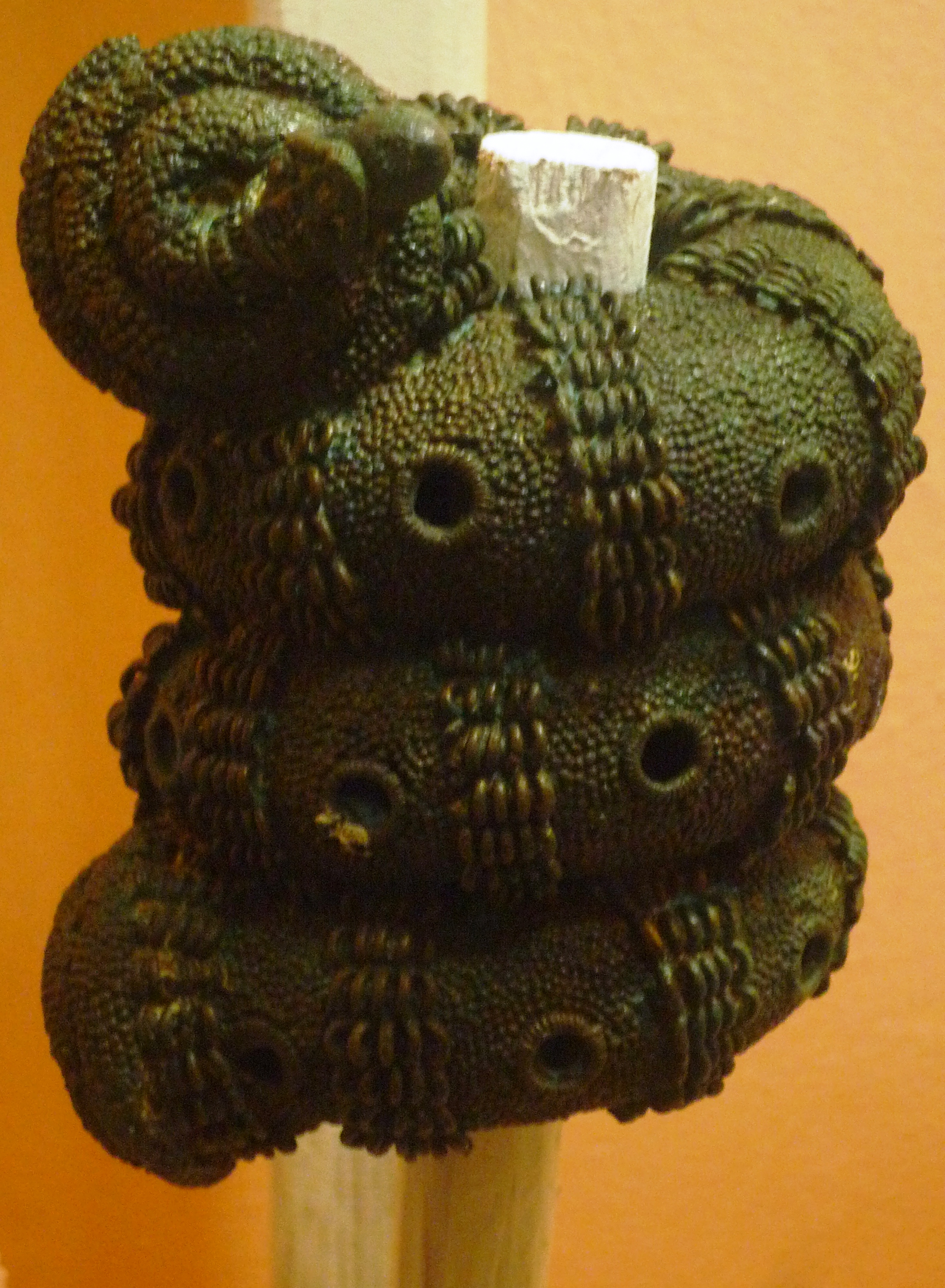
Bronze ornamental staff head; 9th century; Nigerian National Museum (Lagos)

The metal workers of ancient Igbo-Ukwu were not aware of commonly used techniques such as wire making, soldering or riveting which suggests an independent development and long isolation of their metal working tradition. It is therefore perplexing that they were able to create objects with such fine surface detail that they depict, for example small insects which seem to have landed on the surface. Though these appear to have been riveted or soldered on to the artifacts, they were actually cast in one piece. The Grove Encyclopedia of Materials and Techniques in Art describes them as being "among the most inventive and technically accomplished bronzes ever made". Although the lost wax casting process was used to produce the bronzes, latex was probably used in Igbo-Ukwu instead of beeswax which would explain how the artists were able to produce such fine and filigrann surface detail. Some of the techniques used by the ancient smiths are not known to have been used outside Igbo-Ukwu such as the production of complex objects in stages with the different parts later fixed together by brazing or by casting linking sections to join them. However the complexity of some of the Igbo-Ukwu objects has led to considerable altercation between various metallurgic experts and debates regarding the actual production process which is an affidavit for the highly developed and intricate work of the ancient artists.

The composition of the metal alloys used in the production of the bronze is unique, with an unusually high silver content and is distinct from alloys used in Europe, the Mediterranean or other African bronze centers. About 85–90% of the metal ore used to produce the bronze originated from old mines in Abakiliki about 100 kilometers from Igbo-Ukwu. This finding is corroborated by recent lead isotope and silver content analysis of fragmented metal objects. A small percentage of ores are thought to have originated from a secondary source. However, an exact location has not been confirmed. Potential sources include North African countries like Tunisia and Morocco, per lead isotope analyses of copper-tin alloys.

== Gallery ==
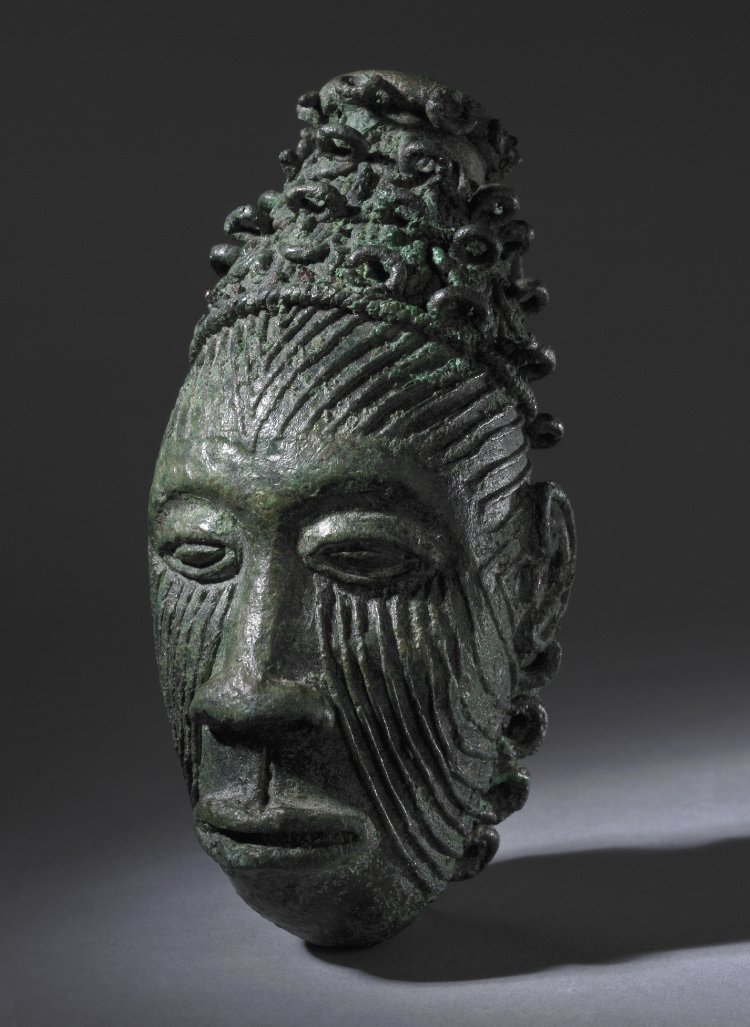
Igbo ukwu face pendant

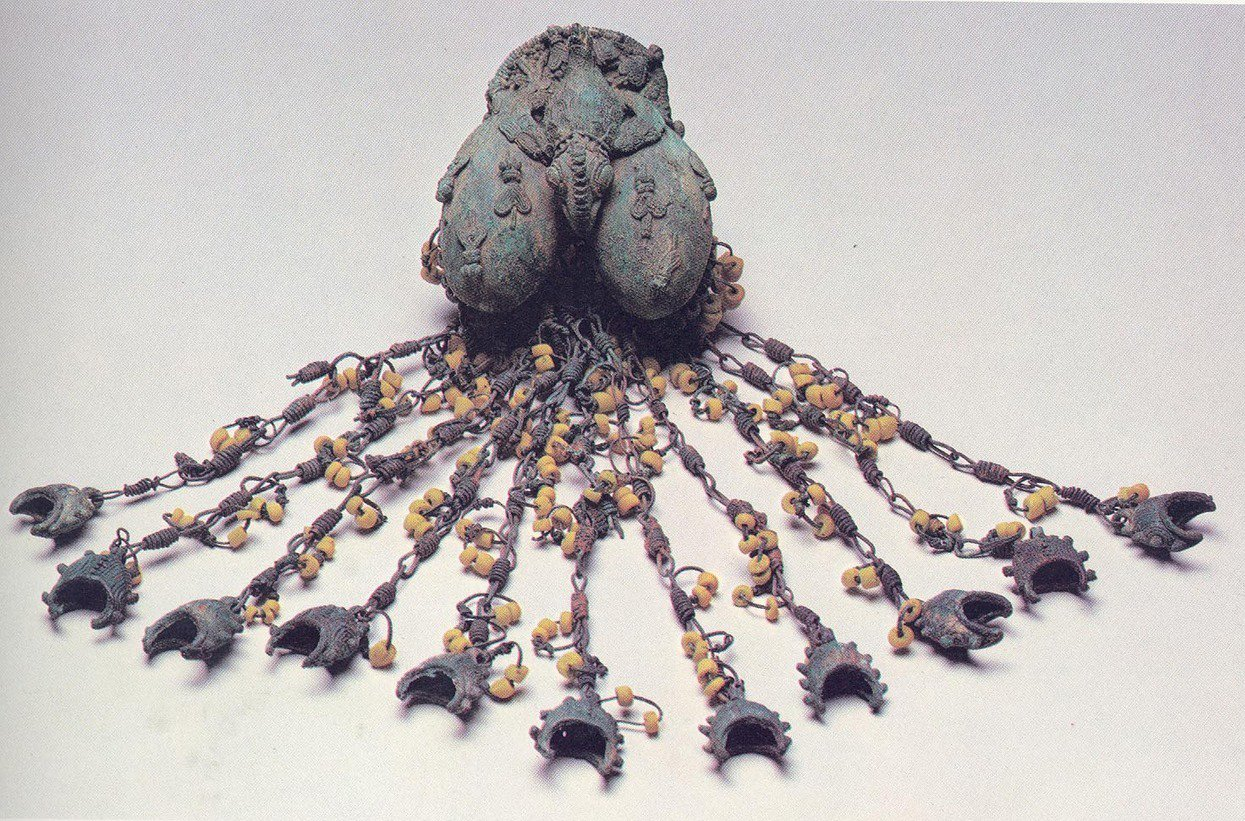
Double egg pendant, leaded bronze, 9th–10th century, unearthed in Igbo Ukwu

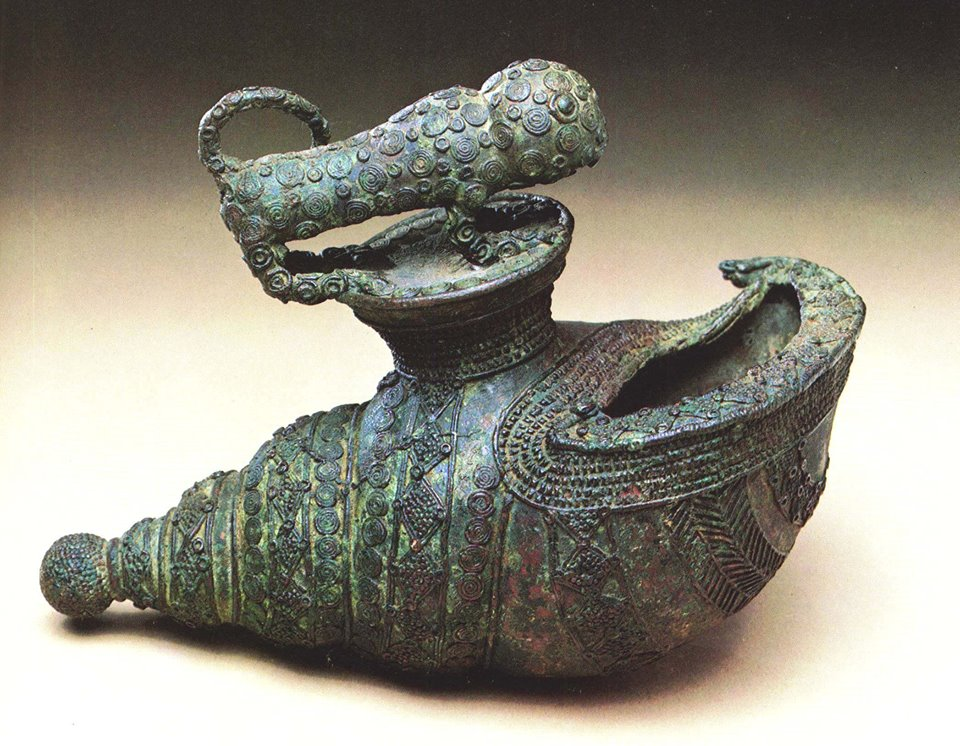
Shell Vessel with Leopard from Igbo-Ukwu

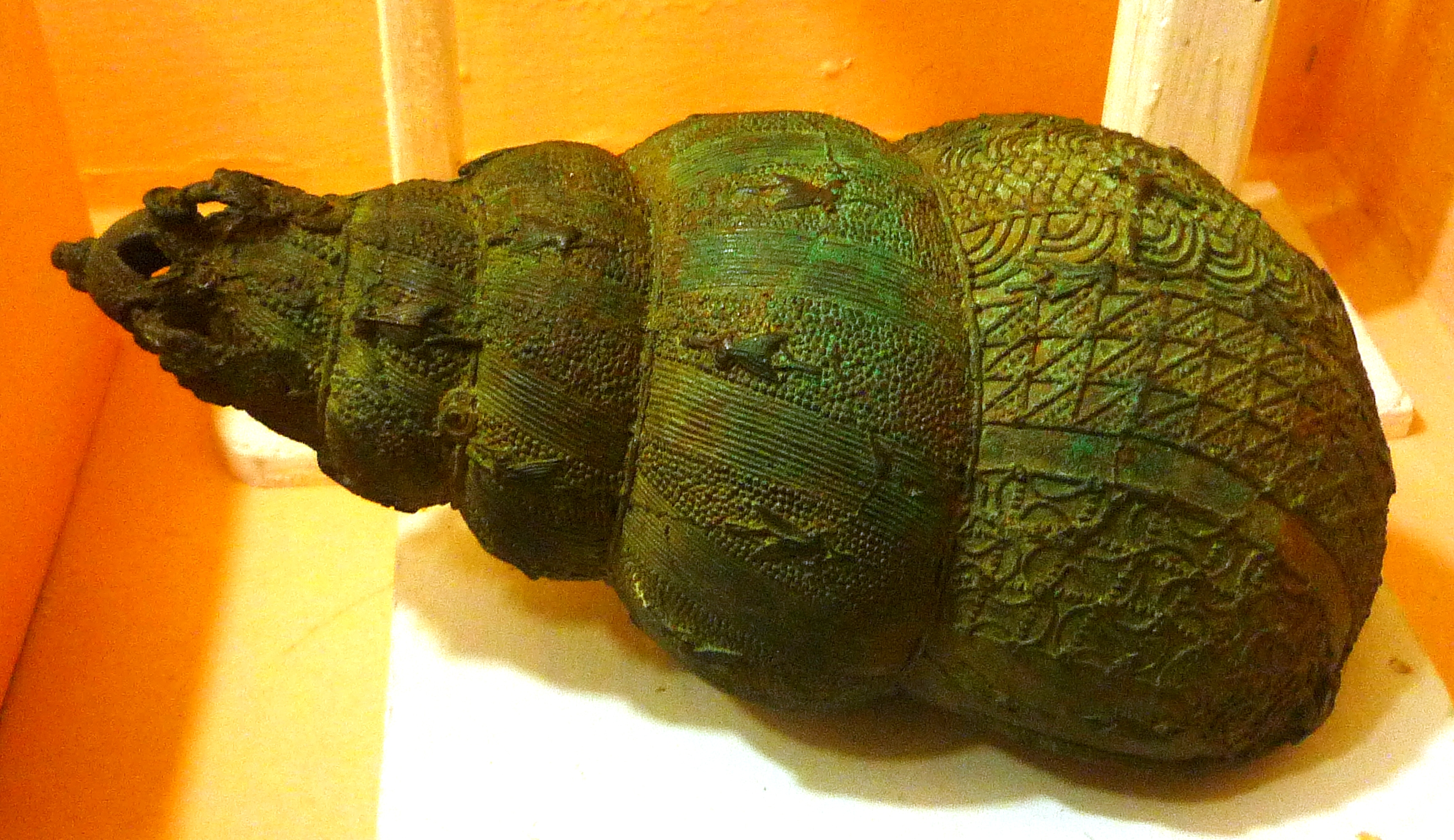
Bronze ceremonial vessel in form of a snail shell; 9th century; Nigerian National Museum

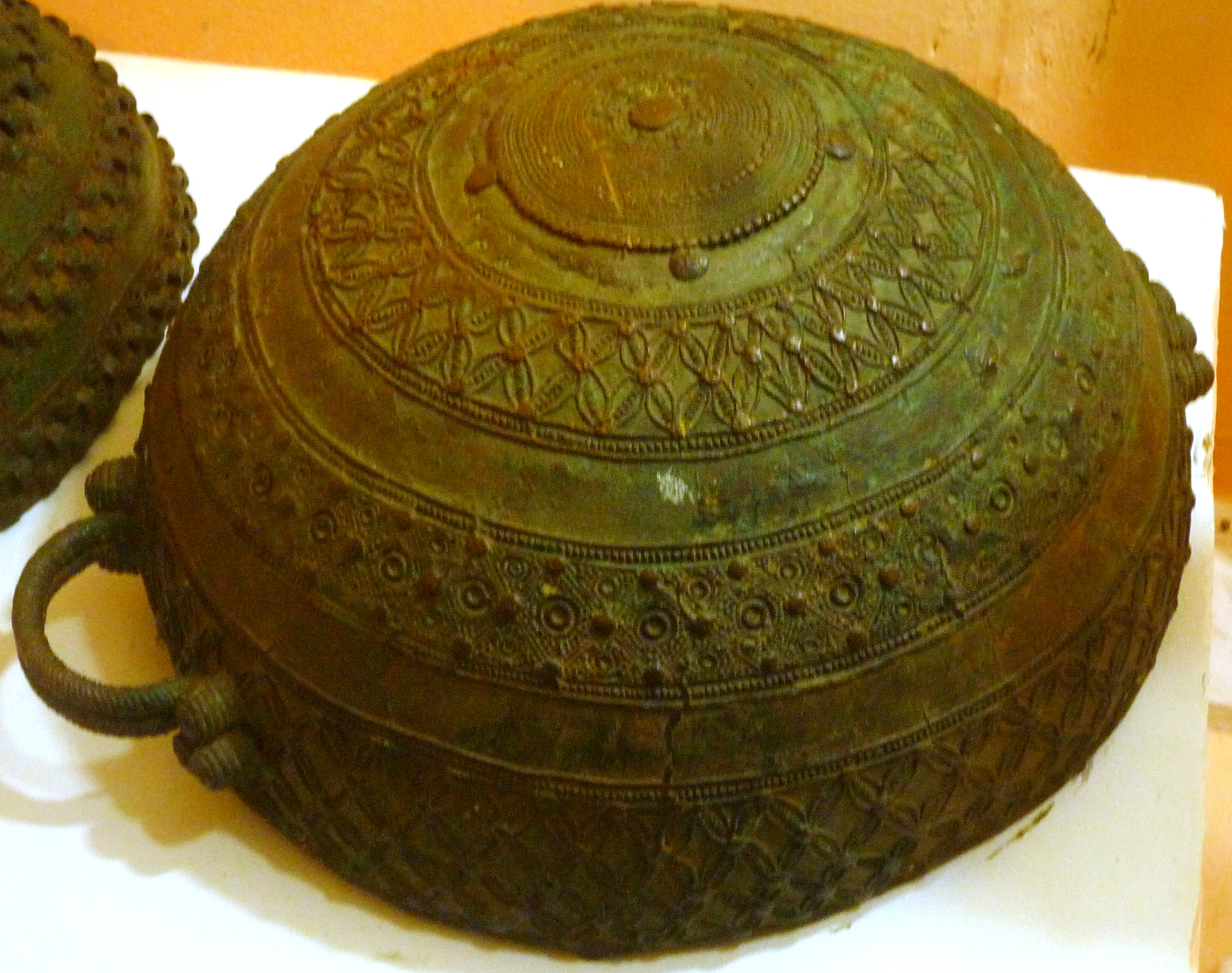
Bronze pot; 9th century; Nigerian National Museum

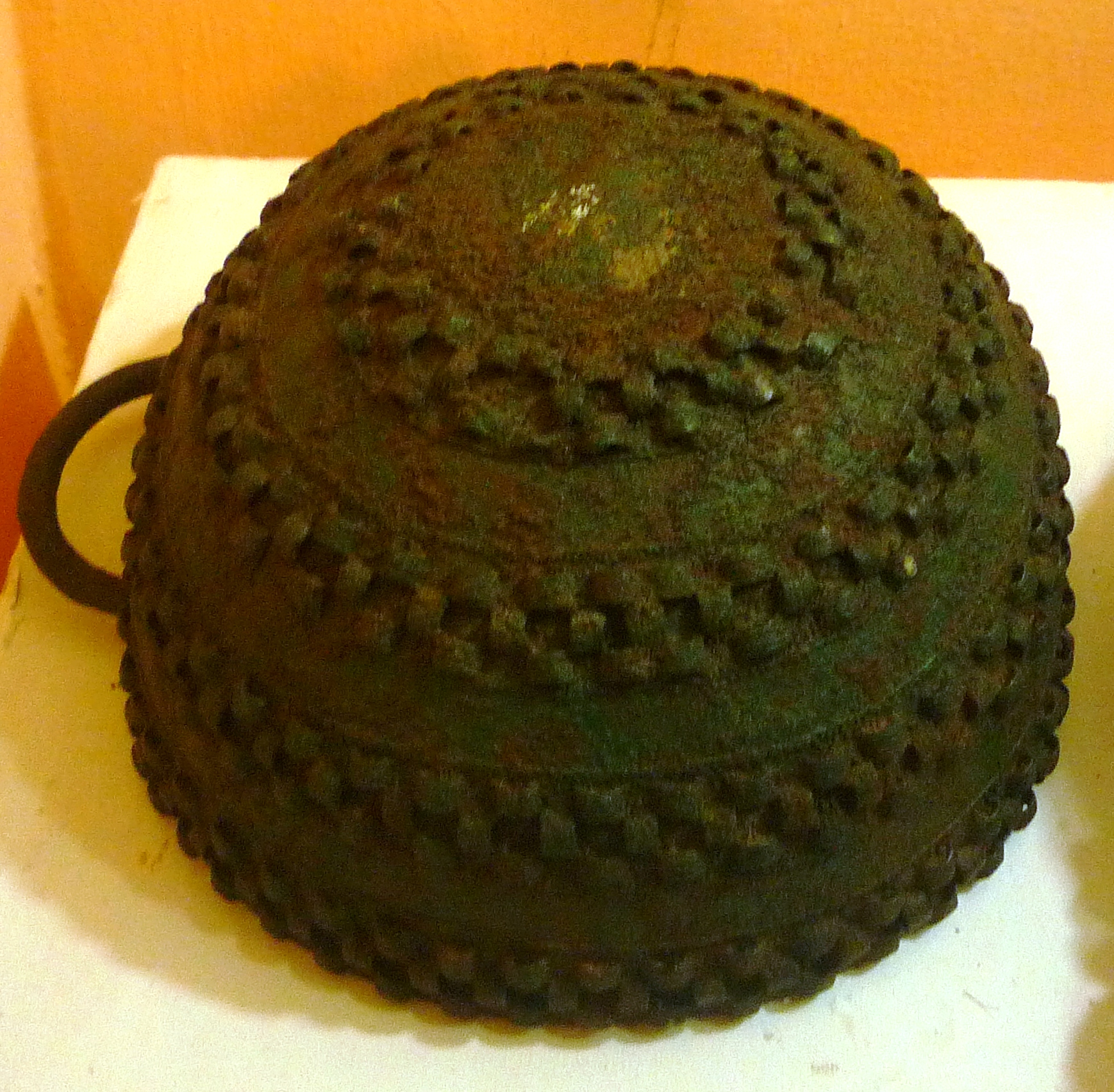
Bronze pot; 9th century; Nigerian National Museum

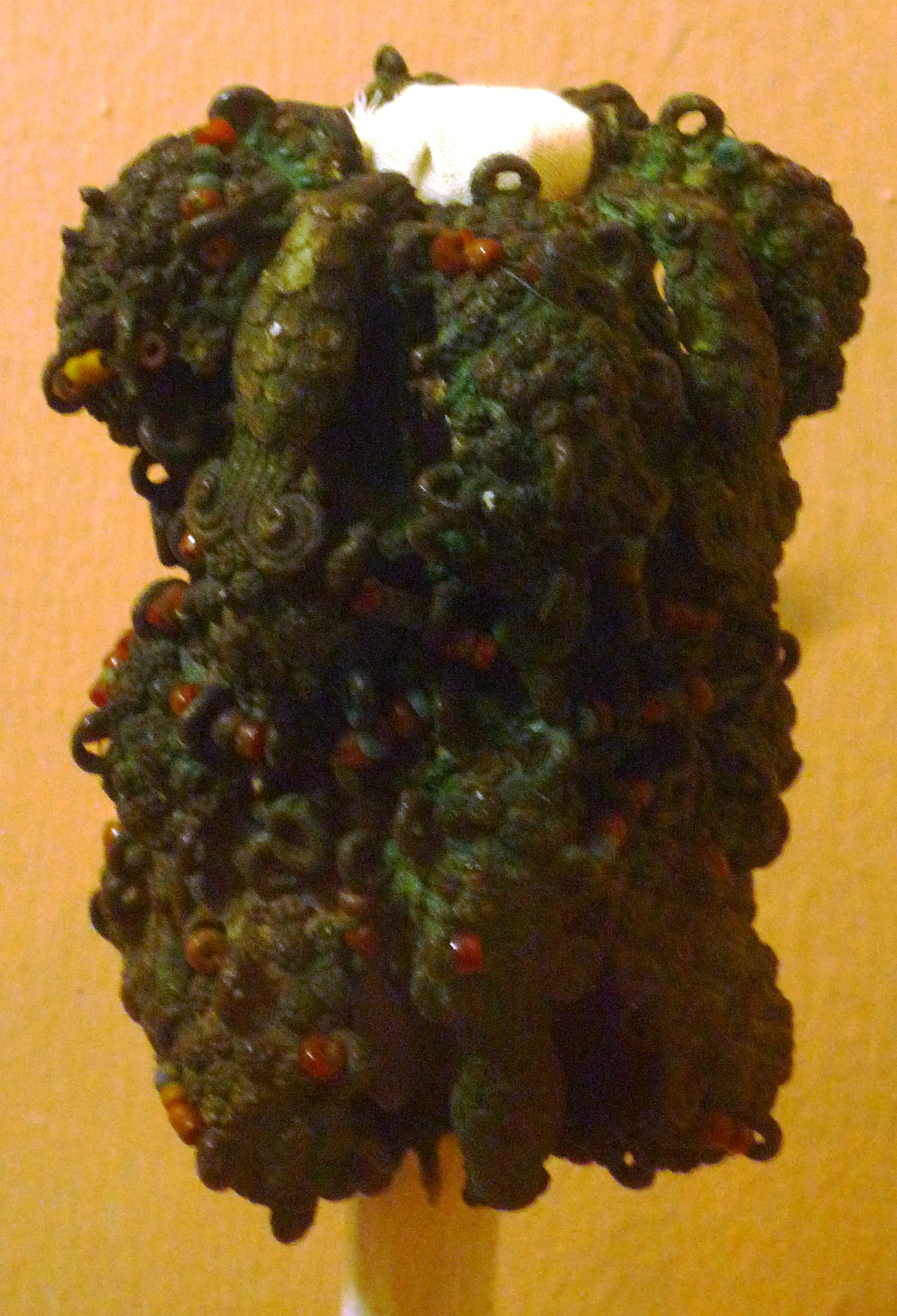
Bronze intricate ornamental staff head; 9th century; Nigerian National Museum

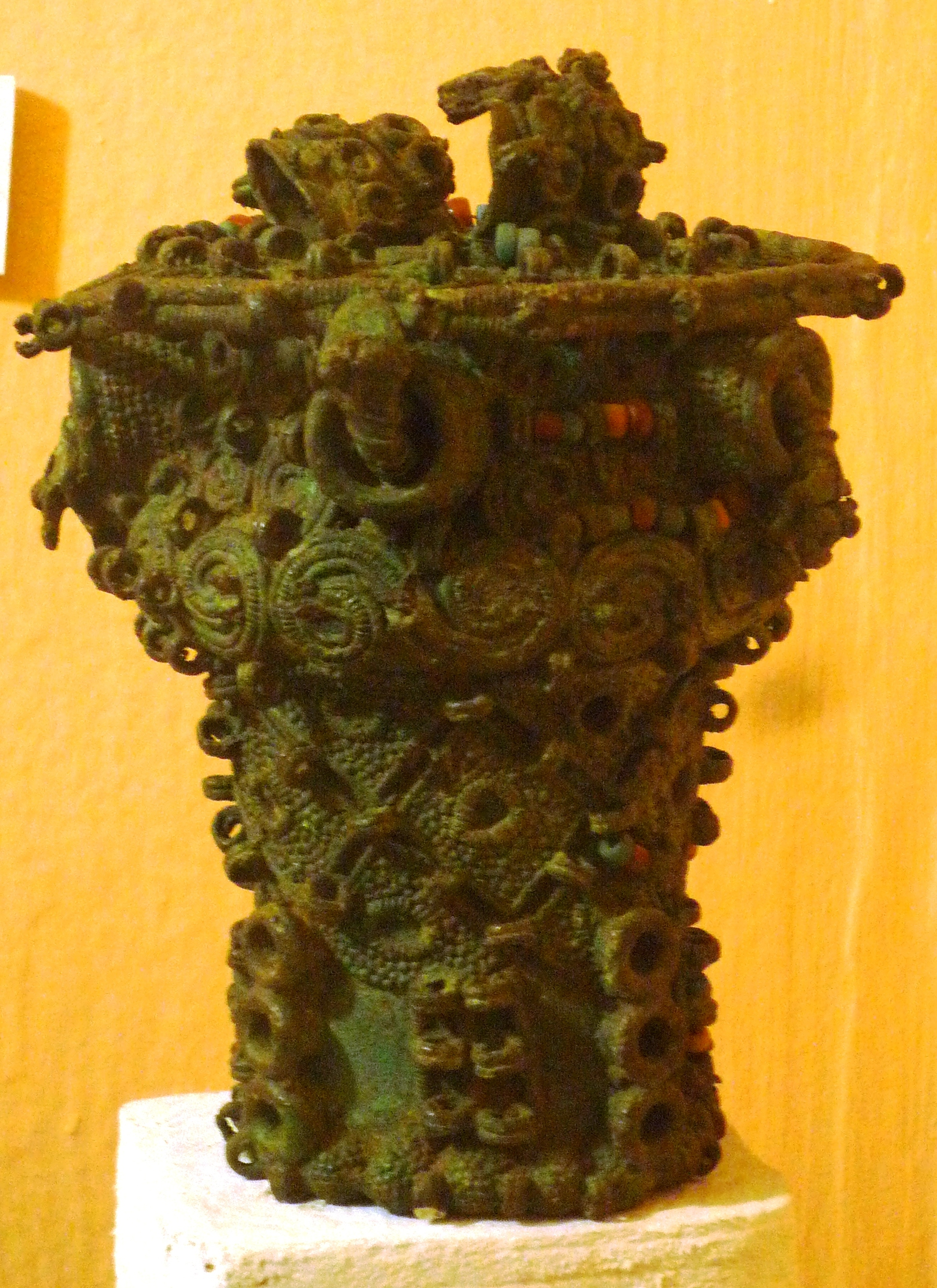
Intricate bronze ceremonial pot; 9th century; Nigerian National Museum

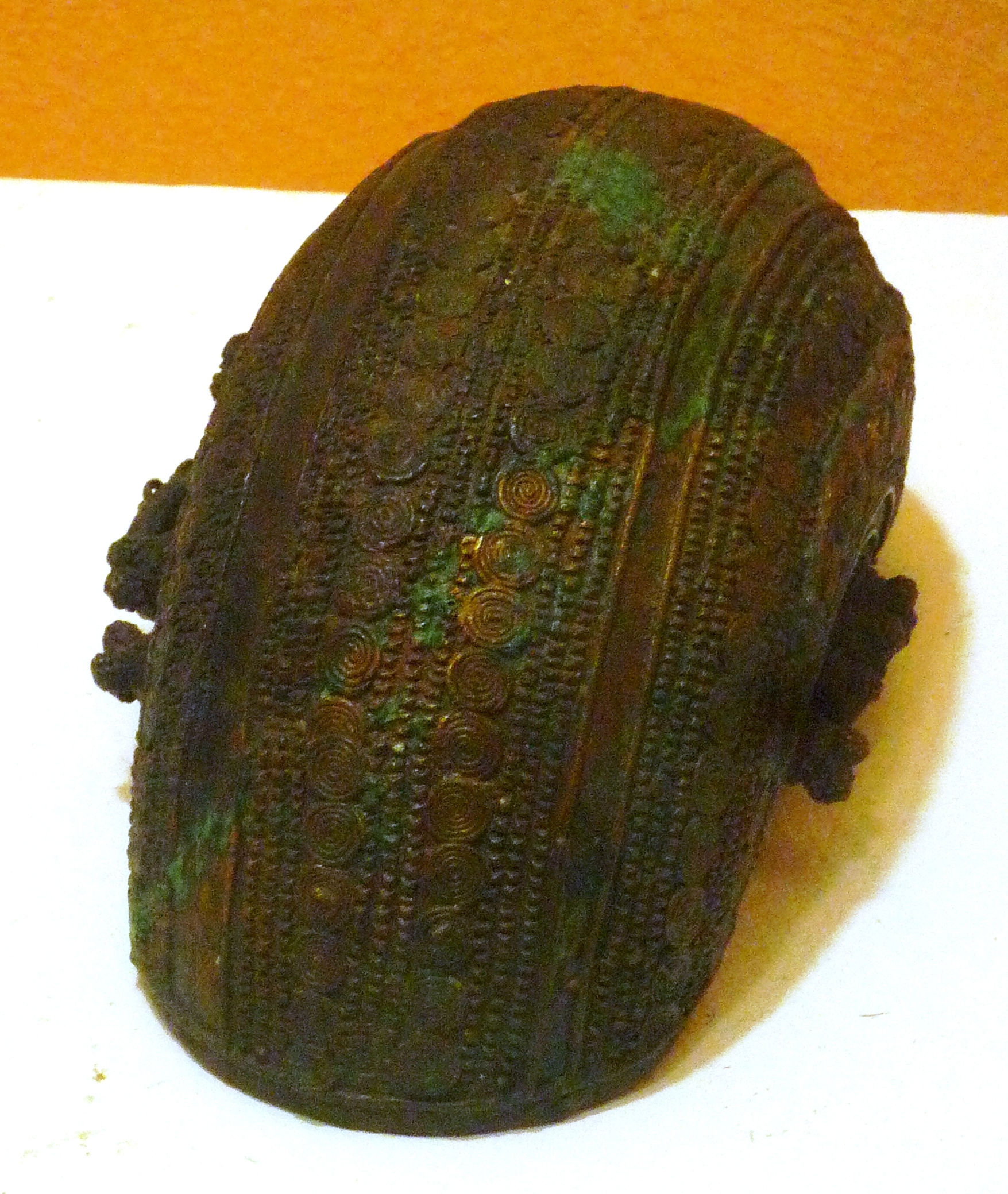
Crescentic bowl; bronze; 9th century; Nigerian National Museum

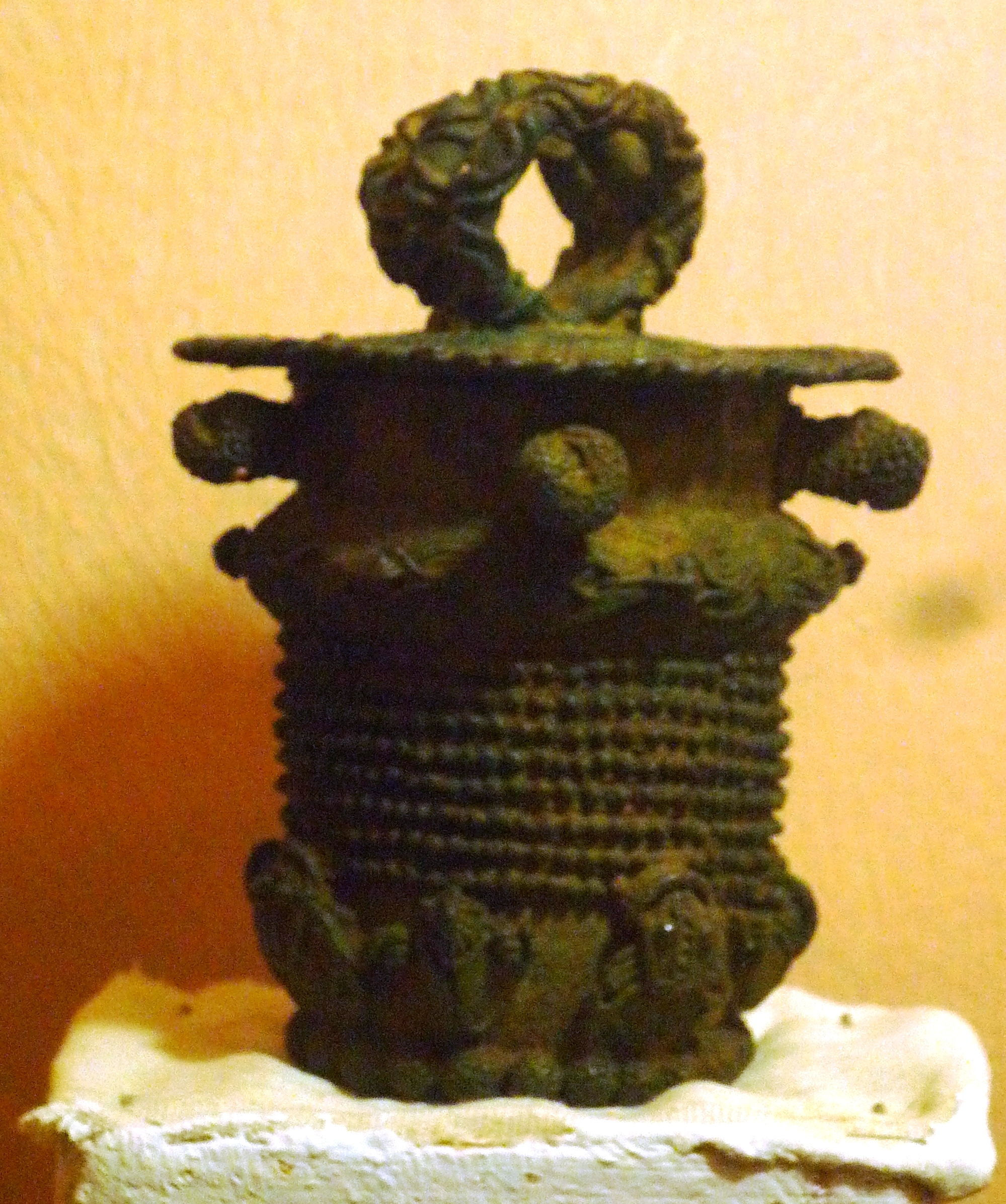
Bronze ceremonial pot; 9th century; Nigerian National Museum (Lagos)

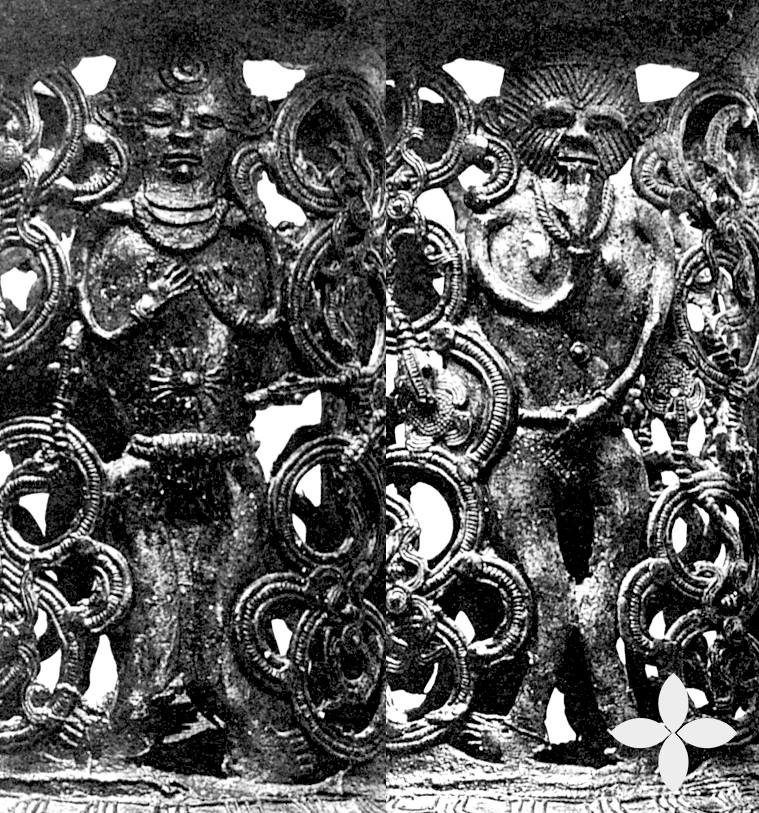
Igbo-Ukwu figurine (possibly a high priest?)

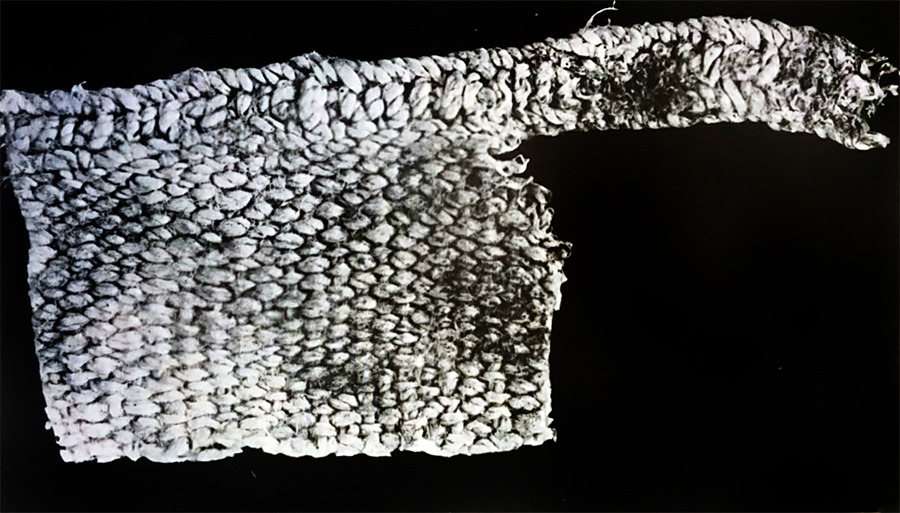
Igbo-ukwu 9th century textile associated with copper chain with weave pattern and selvedge

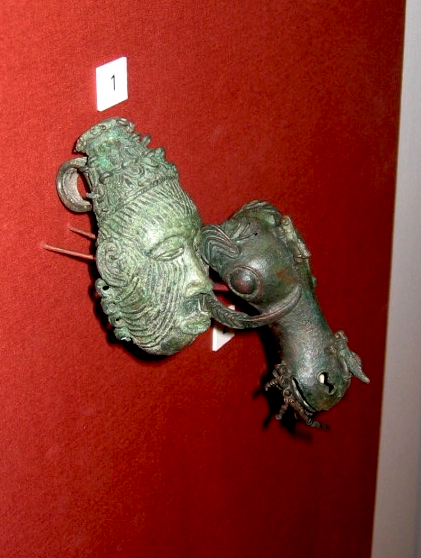
Igbo-Ukwu Bronzes

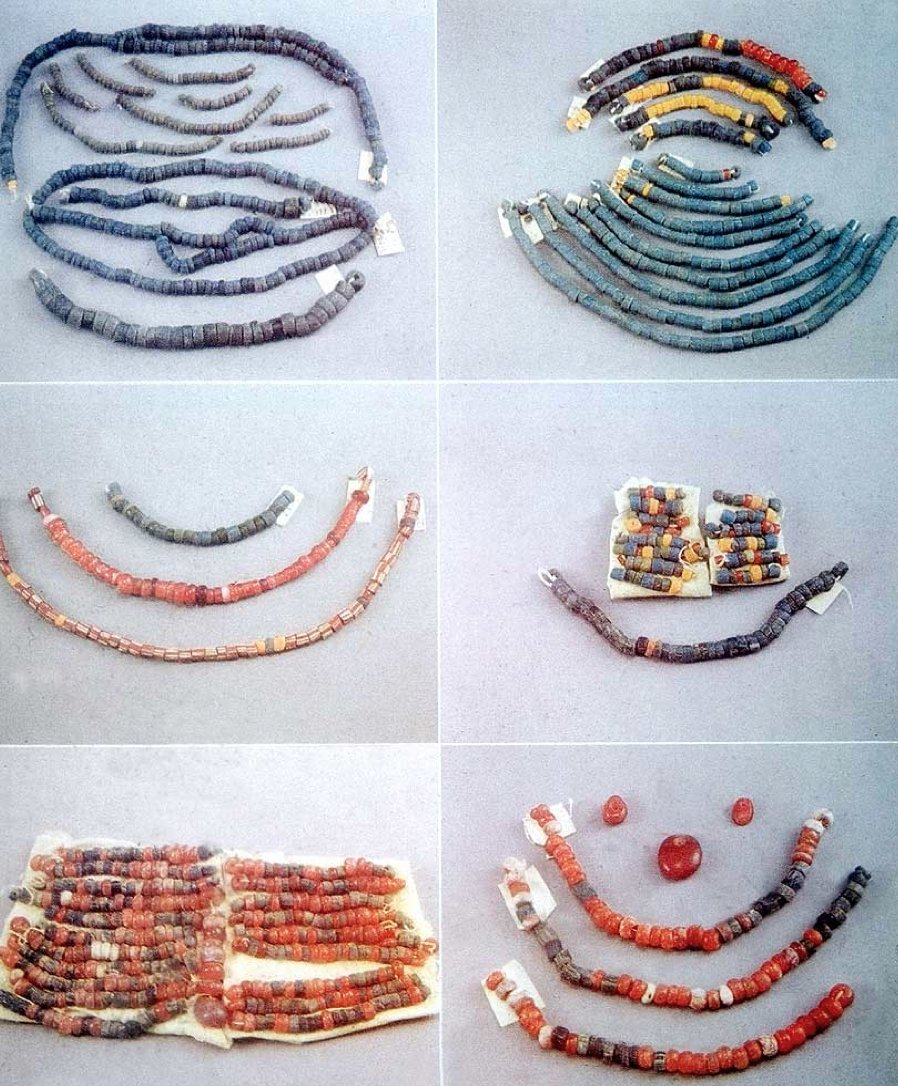
Glass beads from Igbo-Ukwu

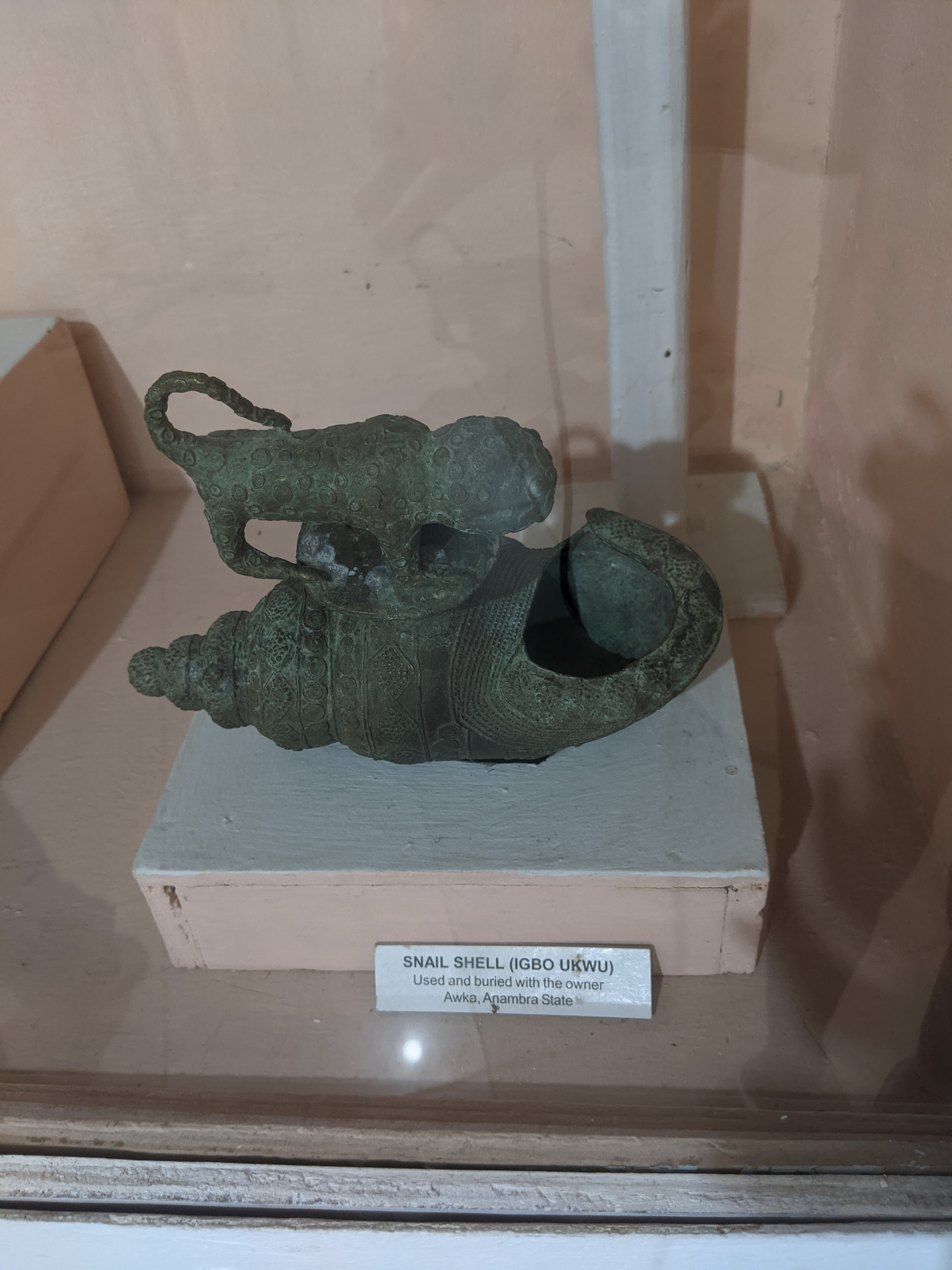
Snail shell with leopard on top

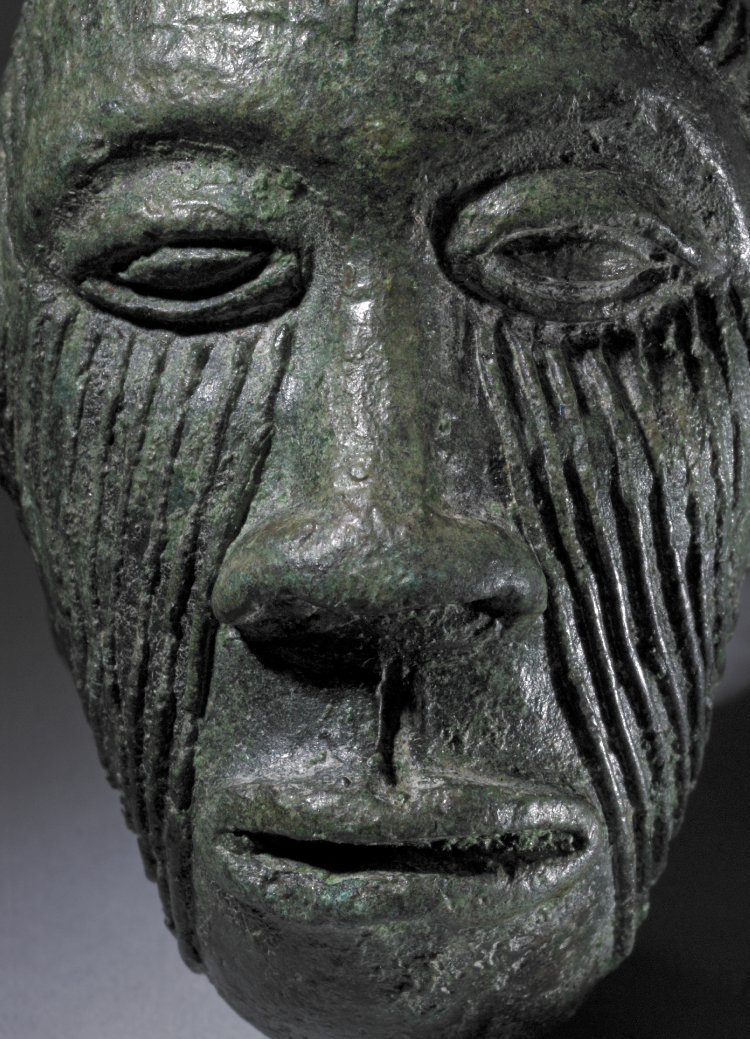
Details of 9th–10th century bronze pendant excavated at Igbo Ukwu, Anambra State

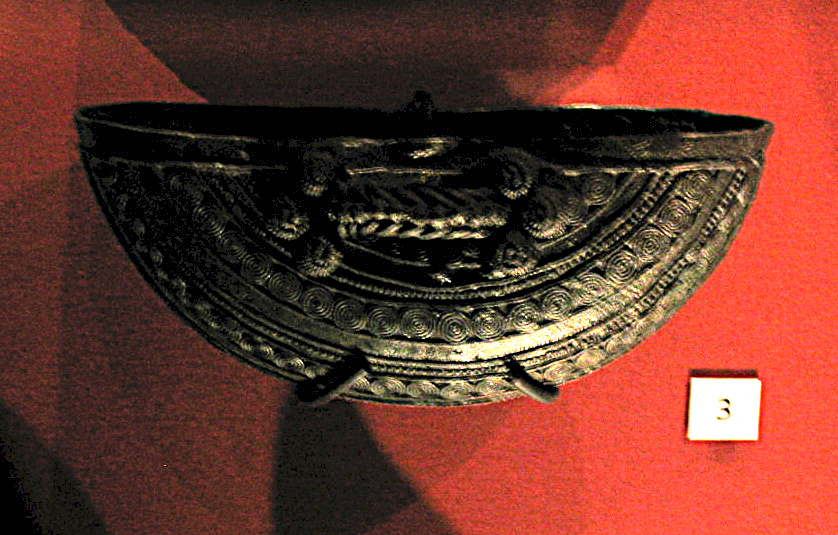
Igbo Ukwu vessel

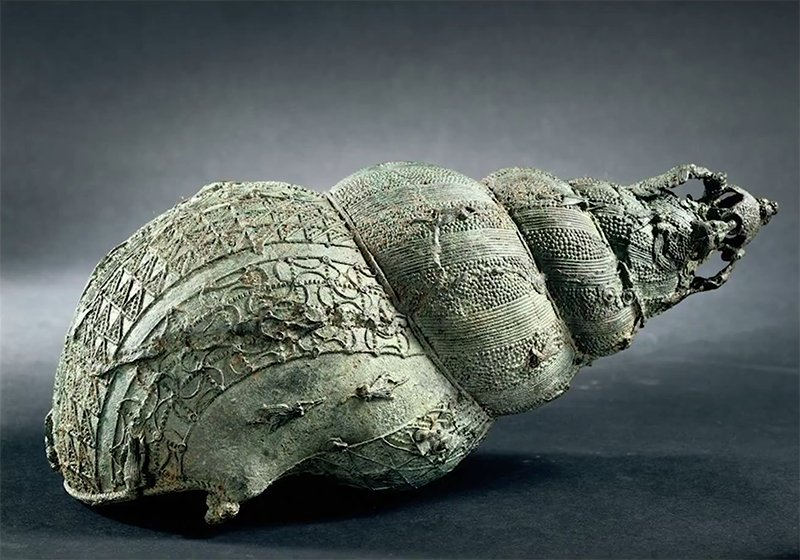
Igbo ukwu vase

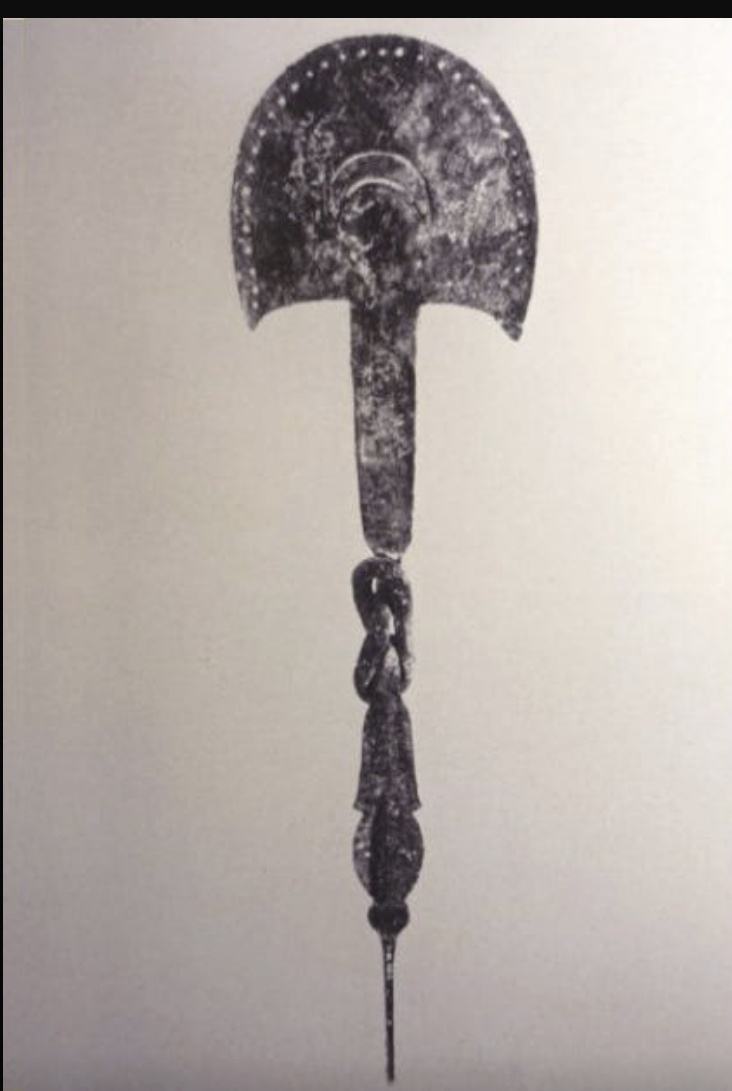
Igbo-Ukwu Copper fan

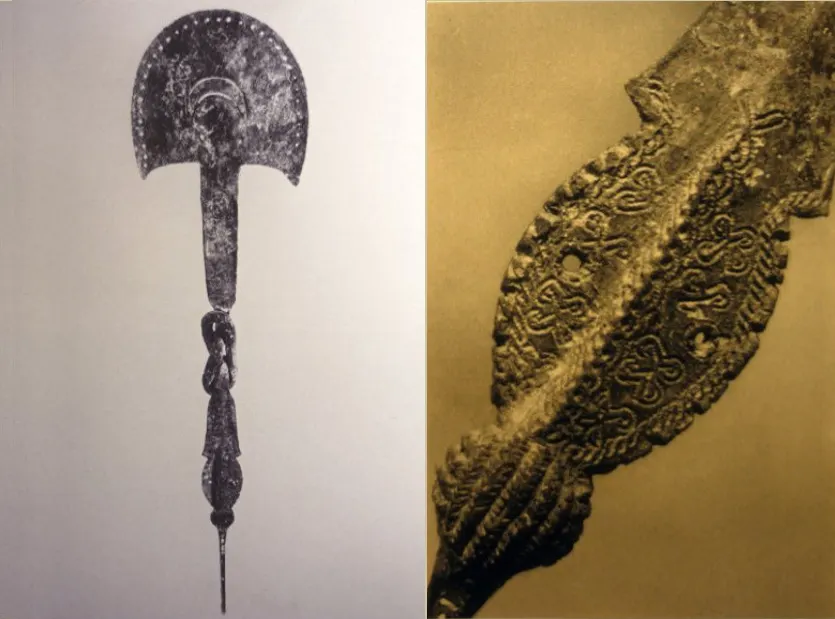
Igbo Ukwu copper fan with base

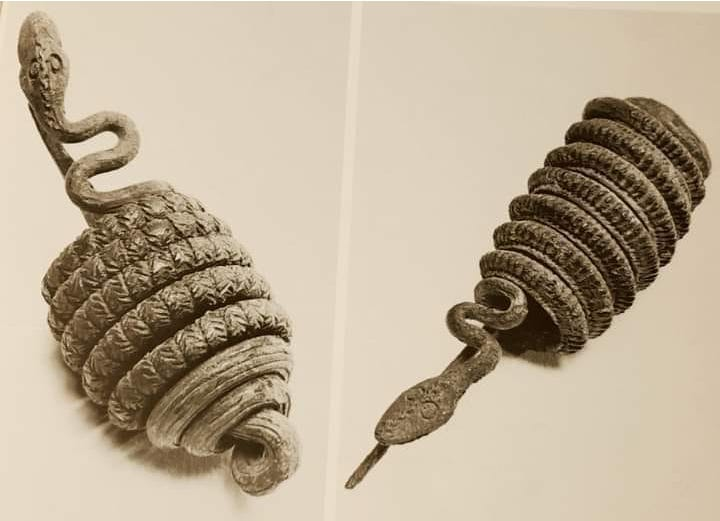
Copper spiral snake ornament, 9th century

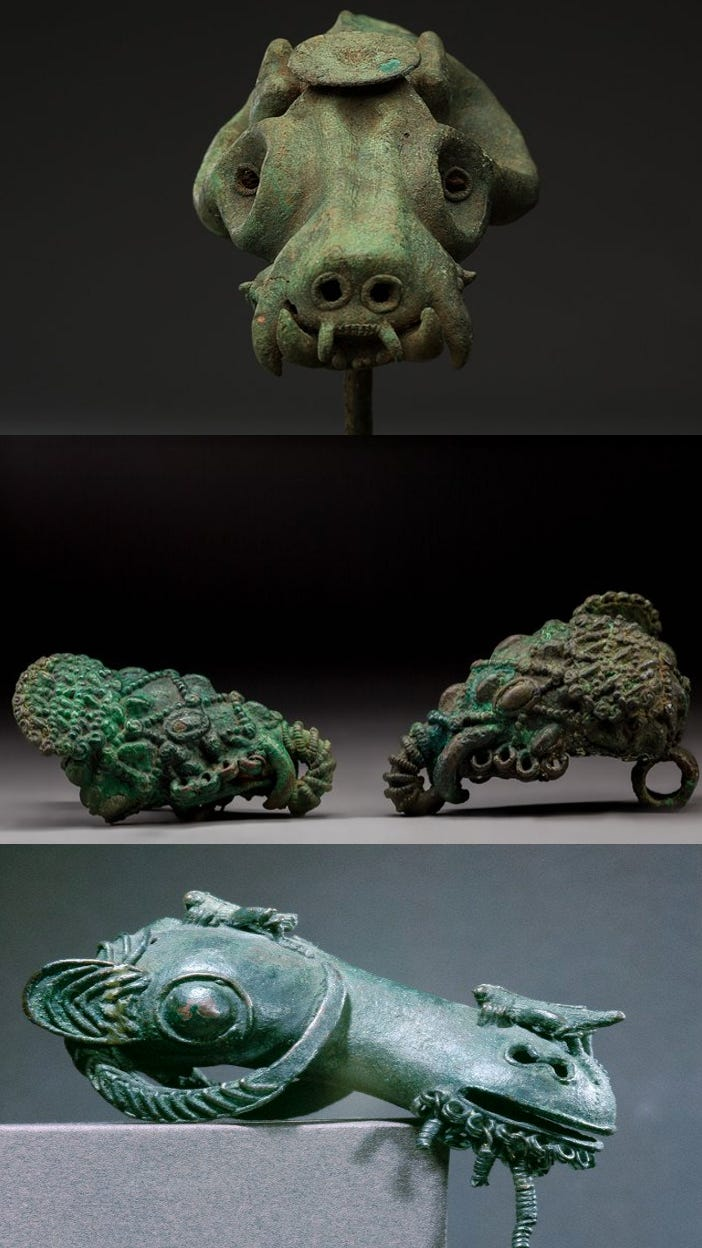
Bronze pendant in the form of a leopard’s head, bronze pendants in form of rams heads, bronze ram’s head

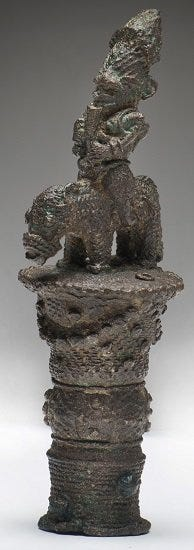
Equestrian figure on a bronze hilt

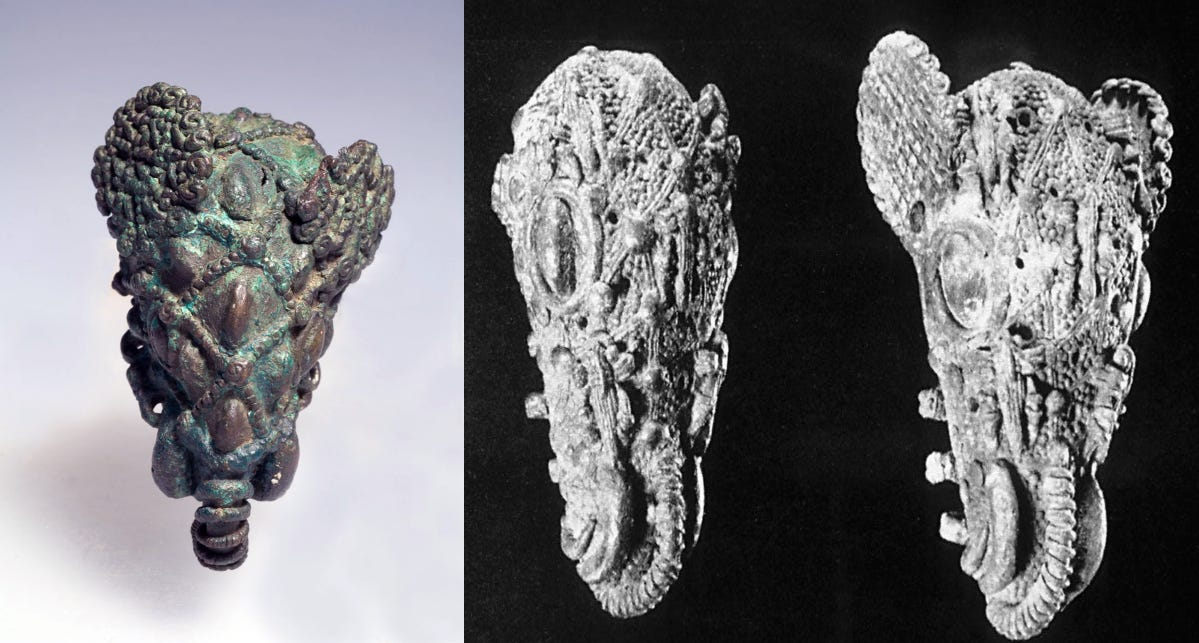
Bronze pendants in form of stylized elephant heads

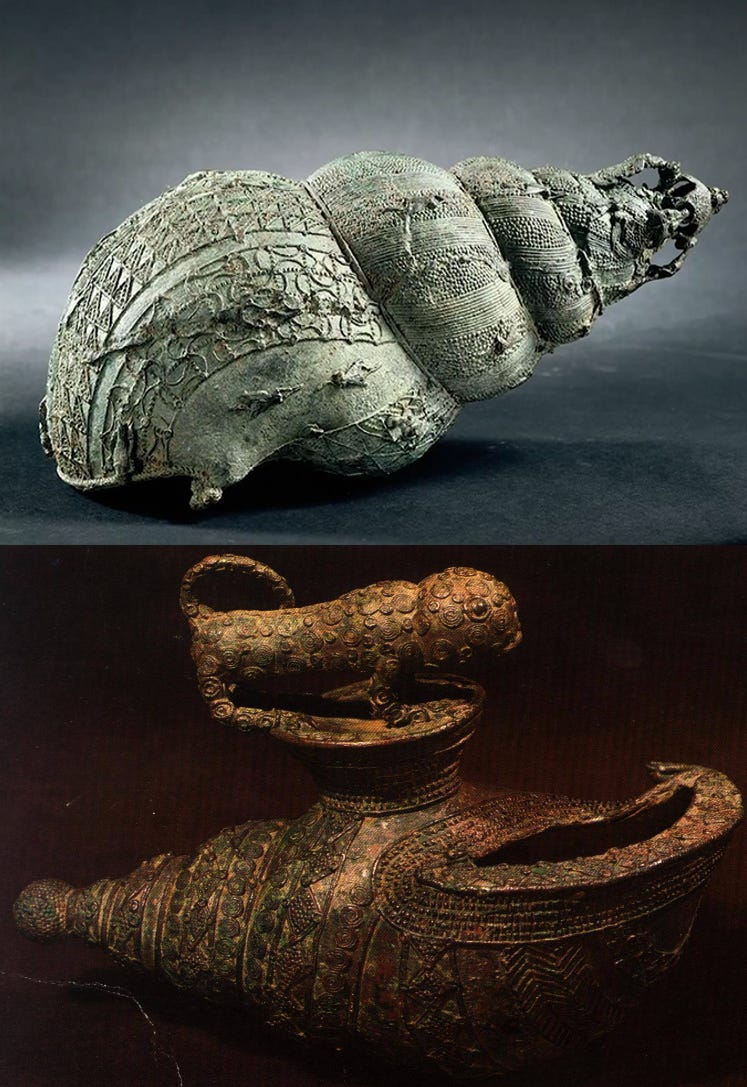
Bronze shell with four snakes swallowing frogs and a fly-covered patterned surface, Bronze shell surmounted by a leopard

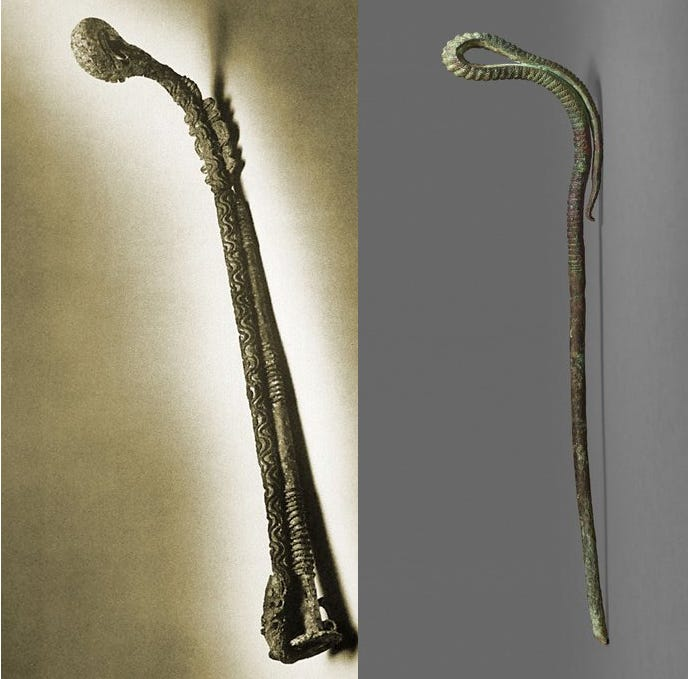
Copper rod that supported a wood and leather scabbard in which an iron blade rested

== See also ==
- Igbo-Ukwu
- Lejja
- Opi (archaeological site)
