= Pamela Jane Smith =

American–Canadian historian and social activist (born 1944)

Pamela Jane Smith (married name Smith Shaw; born 1944, New York) is an American–Canadian historian and social activist, specialising in the history of 20th century British and Canadian archaeology.

== Publications ==
- Smith, Pamela Jane (2009). A "Splendid Idiosyncrasy”: Prehistory at Cambridge, 1915–50. BAR British Series. Oxford: Archaeopress. ISBN 9781407304304.
- Callander, Jane; Smith, Pamela Jane (2007). "Pioneers in Palestine: The Women Excavators of El-Wad Cave, 1929". In Hamilton, Sue; Whitehouse, Ruth D.; Wright, Katherine I. (eds.). Archaeology and Women: Ancient and Modern Issues. London: Routledge. pp. 76–82. ISBN 978-1598742237.
