= Manot =

Manot may refer to:

- Manot, Charente, a commune in the Charente department of France
- Manot, Israel, a moshav in northern Israel
- Manot Cave, a site in Israel
  - Manot 1, the name of a skull of an anatomically modern human found in Manot Cave

== See also ==
- Manat (disambiguation)
