= Antelias Cave =

Cave in Lebanon

- Mugharet-el-Bileni
- Location in Lebanon
- 33.9°N 35.616667°E
- Periods: Paleolithic, Neolithic
- Location: 2.5 km (1.6 mi) east of Antelias
- Region: northeast of Beirut

Site notes
- Excavation dates: 1833, 1893, 1901, 1914, 1944, 1948
- Archaeologists: Gustaf Hedenborg, Godefroy Zumoffen, Raoul Describes, Auguste Bergy, J. Franklin Ewing
- Condition: destroyed

Antelias Cave was a large cave located 2.5 km (1.6 mi) east of Antelias, 10 km (6.2 mi) northeast of Beirut close to the wadi of Ksar Akil.

== Archaeological discoveries ==
The cave was discovered by Gustaf Hedenborg in 1833. Godefroy Zumoffen made an excavation in 1893, finding an Aurignacian industry amongst large quantities of bones and flints. He also found remains of a human fetus, which was only published in 1957 by Henri Victor Vallois and assigned to the Neolithic period. Henri Fleisch re-examined the material from Zumoffen's excavation and concluded that it was not solely Aurignacian but showed evidence of successive industries present as late as the Neolithic. Raoul Desribes also excavated the site and found numerous tools made of bone including two harpoons which are now in the Museum of Lebanese Prehistory.

Auguste Bergy also made a small excavation here and another sounding was made possibly in 1948 by J. Franklin Ewing who described the industry as "transitional, Upper Paleolithic-to-Mesolithic". Dirk Albert Hooijer studied the fauna from the cave and found Dama and Capra to have been predominant.

Neolithic finds included a long, denticulated, lustrous blade. Collections from the cave can be found in the Musée de l'Homme, Paris, Museum of Lebanese Prehistory and the Archaeological Museum of the American University of Beirut.

== Destruction ==
Antelias Cave was destroyed by dynamite in the spring of 1964 due to quarrying in the area. Lorraine Copeland and Peter J. Wescombe recovered some cave deposits from which they hoped to extract material for radio-carbon dating.
