= Manot 1 =

Hominin fossil

- Common name: Manot 1
- Species: Early modern human
- Age: 54,700 years
- Place discovered: Manot Cave, Galilee, Israel
- Date discovered: 2008

Manot 1 is a fossil specimen designated to a skullcap that represents an archaic modern human discovered in Manot Cave, Western Galilee, Israel. It was discovered in 2008 and the scientific description was published in 2015. Radiometric dating indicates that it is about 54,700 years old (the late Mousterian), and thought to be directly ancestral to the Upper Paleolithic populations of the Levant and Europe.

== Discovery ==
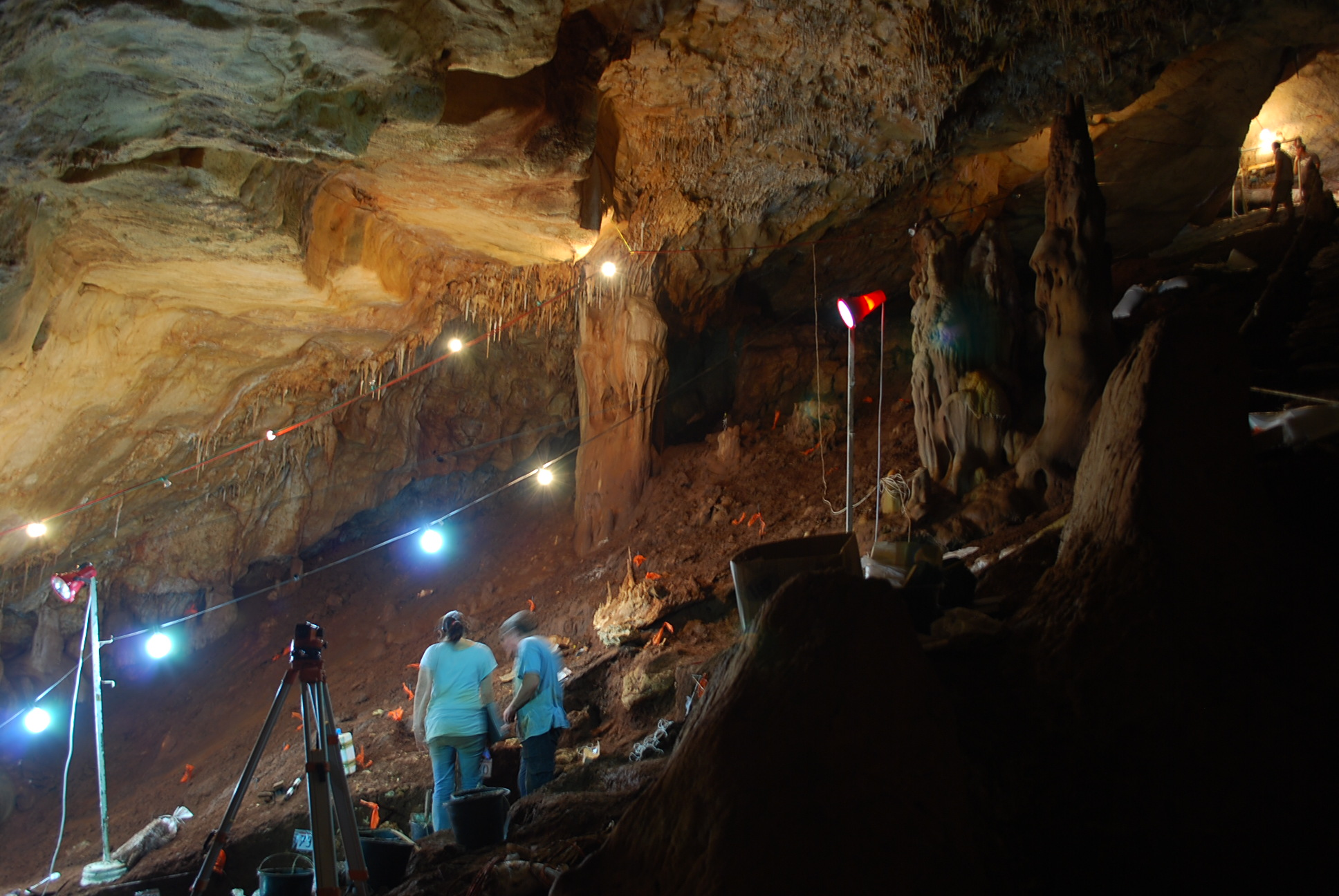
Manot Cave under excavation in 2011

Manot 1 was discovered inside the Manot Cave when the cave itself was discovered in 2008. The cave is situated in Western Galilee, about 10 km north of the HaYonim Cave and 50 km northeast of Mt. Carmel Cave. It was discovered accidentally when a bulldozer cracked open its roof during construction work. Archaeologists from the Cave Research Unit of Hebrew University of Jerusalem were immediately informed and made the initial survey. They found the skullcap alongside stone tools, charcoal pieces, and other human remains. Tools found included a Levallois point, burins, bladelets, overpassed blades, and Aurignacian tools. They also found remains of "fallow deer, red deer, mountain gazelle, horse, aurochs, hyena, and bear". They reported it to the Israel Antiquities Authority (IAA), which granted another brief survey of the cave. The IAA granted a full-scale excavation in 2010. The excavation was conducted by a collaboration of archaeologists from Hebrew University of Jerusalem, Tel Aviv University, Geological Survey of Israel, Zinman Institute of Archaeology of University of Haifa, Kimmel Center for Archaeological Sciences of Weizmann Institute of Science, and the Department of Archaeology of Boston University.

== Description ==
Manot 1 is an adult individual represented by an almost complete skullcap (calvaria) very similar to those of modern humans. But it has a relatively small brain size, which is estimated at 1,100 mL, compared to modern human brain which is about 1,400 mL. Its unique features are the bun-shaped occipital, the moderate arch of the parietals, flat sagittal area, presence of a suprainiac fossa, and the pronounced superior nuchal line. These combined features indicate that it shares a number of features between the most recent African humans and those of European from the Upper Paleolithic period. But it has notable differences from those of other archaic humans found in the neighbouring Levant. It may also possibly be a human-Neanderthal hybrid. The discoverers concluded that:

The overall shape and discrete morphological features of the Manot 1 calvaria demonstrate that this partial skull is unequivocally modern.

== Significance ==
Older remains of early modern humans in the region include fossils from Misliya Cave (c. 200,000 BP) and the Skhul and Qafzeh hominins (c. 100,000 BP).

Manot 1, at 55,000 years old, is the oldest fossil found in West Asia which post-dates the presumed recent out-of-Africa expansion, after about 70,000 years ago. It is thought to be ancestral to the modern Western Eurasian lineages that began to develop during the Upper Paleolithic.

The age of the fossil is consistent with the period of interbreeding between Neanderthals and modern humans. While extraction and sequencing of DNA from the remains could potentially confirm that interbreeding was occurring at that time, the odds of doing so successfully are reduced by the region's warm climate, which speeds up DNA degradation.

== See also ==
- Archaeology of Israel
- Prehistory of the Levant
- Skhul and Qafzeh hominins
