= Bohunician =

Paleolithic archeological industry in South-Central and Eastern Europe

Bohunician culture
- Map showing the approximate location of the Bohunician culture
- Geographical range: Europe
- Period: Upper Paleolithic
- Dates: c. 48,000–40,000 BP
- Preceded by: Emiran
- Followed by: Ahmarian, Levantine Aurignacian, Châtelperronian, Szeletian

The Bohunician industry was a Paleolithic archeological industry in South-Central and Eastern Europe. The artifacts assigned to this culture are dated between roughly 48,000 and 40,000 years ago. They were found at the type site of Brno-Bohunice, Stránská skála (Moravia), Bacho Kiro and Temnata Cave (Bulgaria), Dzierzyslaw (Poland), and others.

The Bohunician is "transitional" between the Mousterian and the Aurignacian, and thus a candidate for representing the first wave of anatomically modern humans in Europe. Its technology resembles the Mousterian Levallois technique, as do the contemporary assemblages of the Szeletian (centered on the Bükk Mountains of Hungary but also present in southern Poland) and the Uluzzian (Italy).

Bohunician assemblages are considered similar to Emiran and Ahmarian ones and Bohunician culture may be linked to them. For this reason, it is thought likely that the Bohunician indicates the presence of anatomically modern humans, but this has not been corrobated by the discovery of any associated human remains.

Bohunician cores were created using a modified version of the Levallois technique and prominent tools from this industry include blade-end scrapers, burins, and Mousterian side scrapers and points.

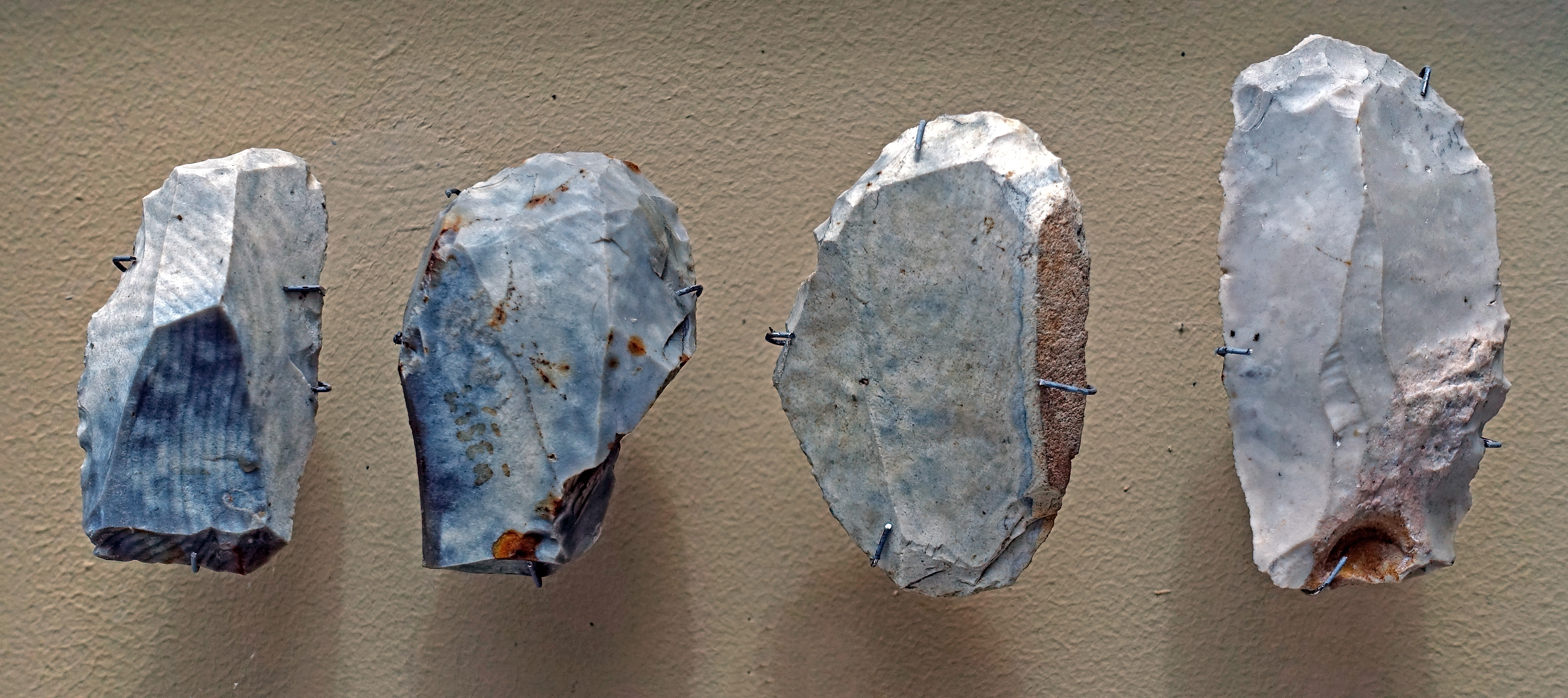
Bohunician scrapers in the Moravian Museum, Czech Republic
