= Manot Cave =

Archaeological site in Israel

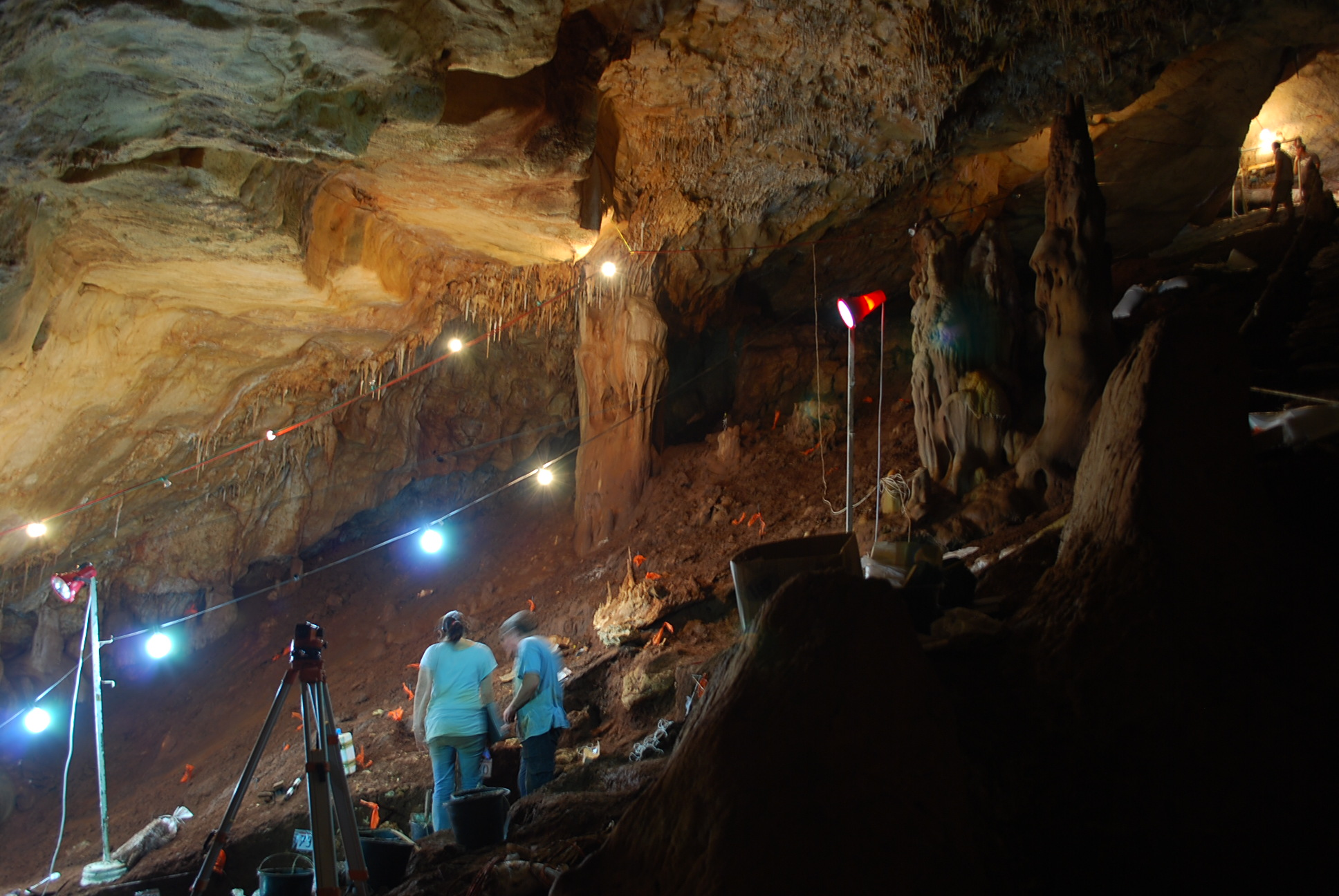
- Manot Cave under excavation in 2011

- Location in Israel
- 33°02′06″N 35°11′36″E
- Type: karstic cave
- Periods: Paleolithic
- Cultures: Mousterian; Ahmarian; Levantine Aurignacian
- Location: Western Galilee, Israel

Site notes
- Elevation: 220 m (720 ft)
- Length: 80 m (262 ft)
- Excavation dates: 2010–2017

Manot Cave (Hebrew: מערת מנות Me'arat Manot) is a cave in Western Galilee, Israel, discovered in 2008. It is notable for the discovery of a skull that belongs to a modern human, called Manot 1, which is estimated to be 54,700 years old (U–Th dating of the calcitic crust on the Manot 1 calvaria and of speleothems in the cave). The partial skull was discovered at the beginning of the cave's exploration in 2008. Its significance was realised after detailed scientific analysis, and was first published in an online edition of Nature on 28 January 2015. This age implies that the specimen is the oldest known human outside Africa, and is evidence that modern humans lived side-by-side with Neanderthals. The cave is also noted for its "impressive archaeological record of flint and bone artefacts". Geologically, it is an "active stalactite cave".

== Discovery ==
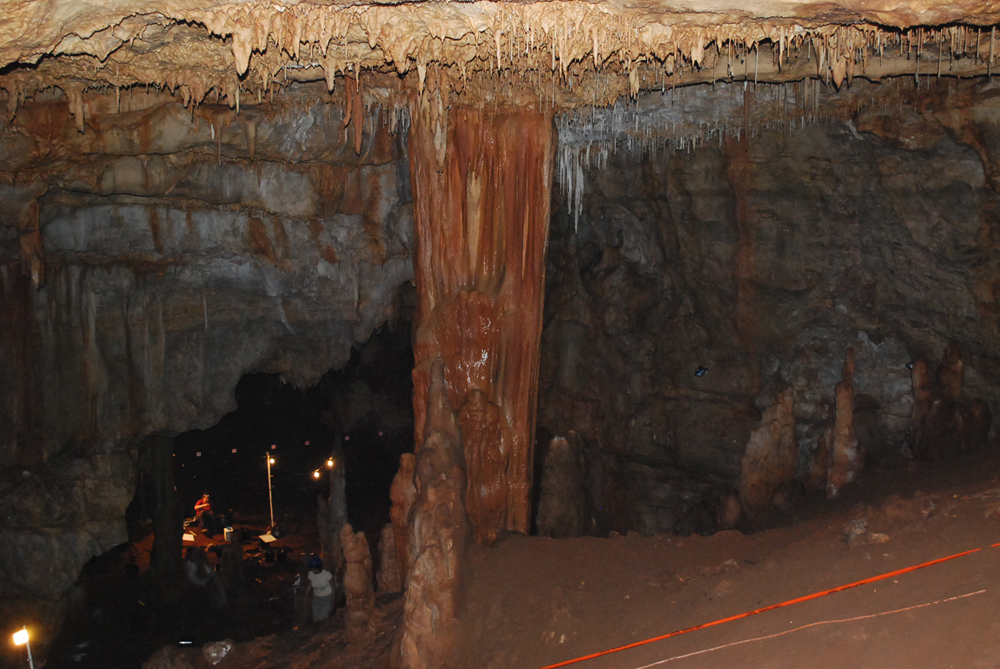
Manot Cave: Stalactites and stalagmites form a column

Manot Cave is situated in Western Galilee, about 10 km north of HaYonim Cave and 50 km northeast of Mt. Carmel. It was discovered accidentally during construction work in 2008 when a bulldozer struck open its roof. Experts from the Cave Research Unit of Hebrew University of Jerusalem immediately made the initial survey. Important finds were stone tools, charcoal pieces, and human remains. The tools consisted of a Levallois point, burins, bladelets, overpassed blades, and Aurignacian tools such as nosed and carinated endscrapers. There were also remains of "fallow deer, red deer, mountain gazelle, horse, aurochs, hyena, and bear". The major find was an almost complete human skull. The finds were reported to the Israel Antiquities Authority (IAA), which granted another survey. Ofer Marder and H. Khalaily made the survey and found that it was a rich archaeological site. Recognising its importance, the IAA granted a full-scale excavation in 2010. For three weeks the site was excavated by a collaboration of archaeologists from Hebrew University of Jerusalem, Tel Aviv University, Geological Survey of Israel, Zinman Institute of Archaeology of University of Haifa, Kimmel Center for Archaeological Sciences of Weizmann Institute of Science, and the Department of Archaeology of Boston University.

== Description ==
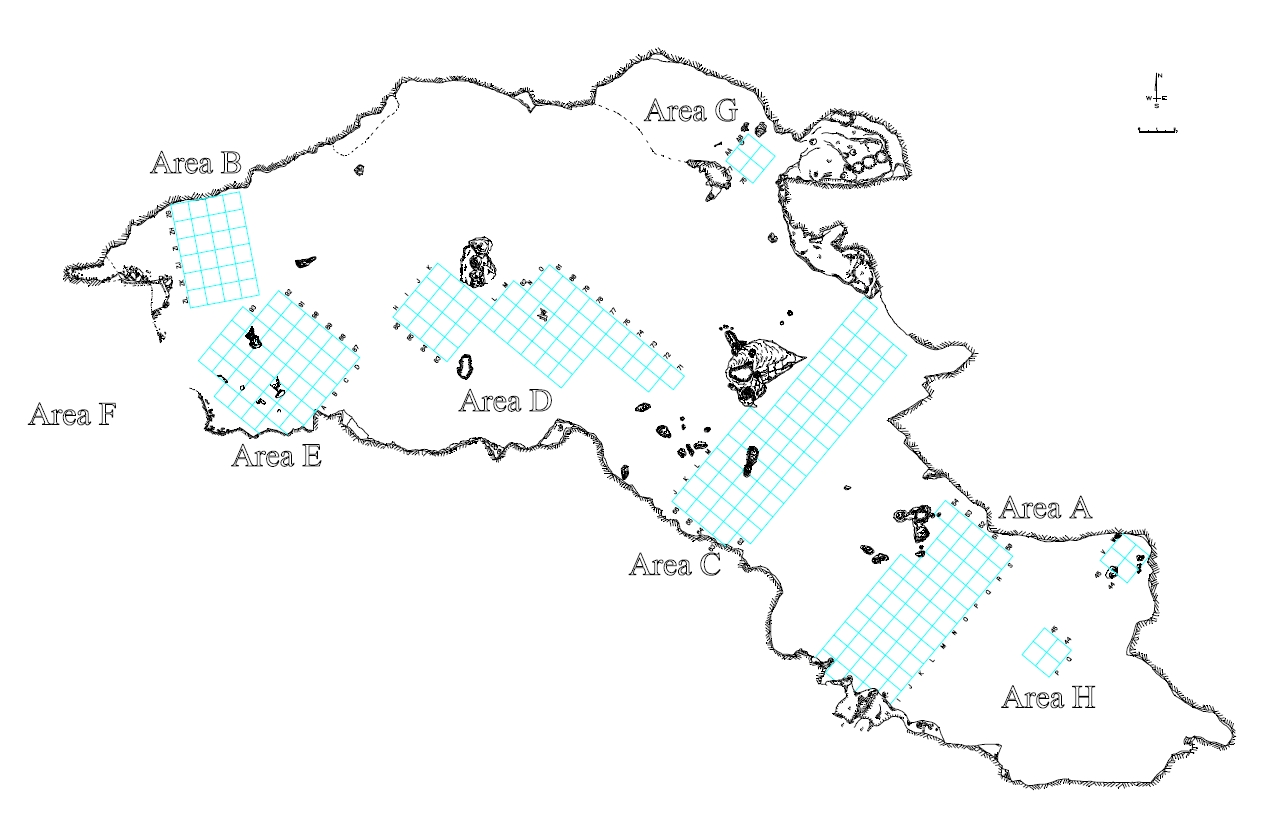
Map of Manot Cave with the areas of excavation

The Manot Cave consists of a lengthy hall, 80 m long and between 10m and 25m wide. Two lower chambers are connected to it from north and south. It is possible that the main entrances were at both the eastern and western ends. The cave has active stalagmite formations. Archaeological remains indicate that the most recent artifacts belong to the Early Palaeolithic period. This further indicates that the cave had been completely sealed for at least 15,000 years. The blockage was probably due to rock falls and active stalagmites at the main entrances.

== Chronology ==
Archaeologists have offered the following chronology for the cave, based on radiocarbon dating: an Early Ahmarian phase (46,000–42,000 BP), a Levantine Aurignacian phase (38,000–34,000 BP), and a post-Levantine Aurignacian phase (34,000–33,000 BP).

== Significance in human evolution ==
The most important find in the cave is a partial skullcap of a modern human, referred to by archaeologists as Manot 1. The specimen is estimated (using uranium–thorium dating) to be 54,700 years old. It shows that modern humans lived together with another human species, the Neanderthals, in the Levant. This could support the notion that these two species had interbred, as evidenced by genome sequencing.

== See also ==
- Kebara Cave
- Ksar Akil
