= Ahmarian =

Paleolithic archeological industry in the Levant

Ahmarian culture
- Approximate location of the Ahmarian culture
- Geographical range: Levant
- Period: Upper Paleolithic
- Dates: c. 46,000 – c. 42,000 BP
- Major sites: Ksar Akil, Manot Cave
- Preceded by: Aterian, Emiran, Bohunician
- Followed by: Levantine Aurignacian; Châtelperronian; Aurignacian (Europe)

The Ahmarian culture was a Paleolithic archeological industry in the Levant dated at 46,000–42,000 years before present (BP) and thought to be related to Levantine Emiran and younger European Aurignacian cultures.

The word "Ahmarian" was adopted from the archaeological site of Erq el-Ahmar (also written Erk el Ahmar), West Bank, Palestine, a rockshelter in the Judean Desert in the northern Dead Sea Rift. It was explored and excavated by French Prehistorian René Neuville in 1951. The "Ahmarian" category had only been recognized since the 1980s, and was previously designated as "Phase II Upper Paleolithic" or "Ksar Akil Phase B".

== History ==
The Ahmarian period together with the Emiran period, both from the Levant, are among the first periods of the Upper Paleolithic, corresponding to the first stages of the expansion of Homo sapiens out of Africa. From this stage, another wave of modern humans migrated to Europe from Africa to form the beginning of the European Upper Paleolithic, including the Aurignacian culture, where they become known as the Cro-Magnons.

The European Bohunician culture may slightly predate the Ahmarian at 48,000 BP. There is also a claim that it is roughly contemporary with the Aurignacian and the Gravettian cultures of Europe, all emerging prior to the Atlitian, which was also contemporary with the Solutrean and Magdalenian cultures of Western Europe.

Ahmarian technology, which included the complex of blade/bladelet-knapping techniques is also linked to the tools used by the hunter-gatherers of southwestern Asia.

Late Ahmarian is called Masraqan.

=== Technology ===
Ahmarian blades are usually elongated with some curves. The Levallois technique is still in use, but only sparsely, thereby making Ahmarian the first fully Upper Paleolithic period.

Ahmarian assemblages can be found throughout the Levant, including Syria, Lebanon, Israel, Palestine, and Jordan. The Lagaman industry in the Sinai can be considered as derivative to the Ahmarian culture.

"Levantine Aurignacian", from the Levant, is a type of blade technology very similar to the European Aurignacian, immediately following chronologically the Emiran and Early Ahmarian in the same area of the Near East, and closely related to them.

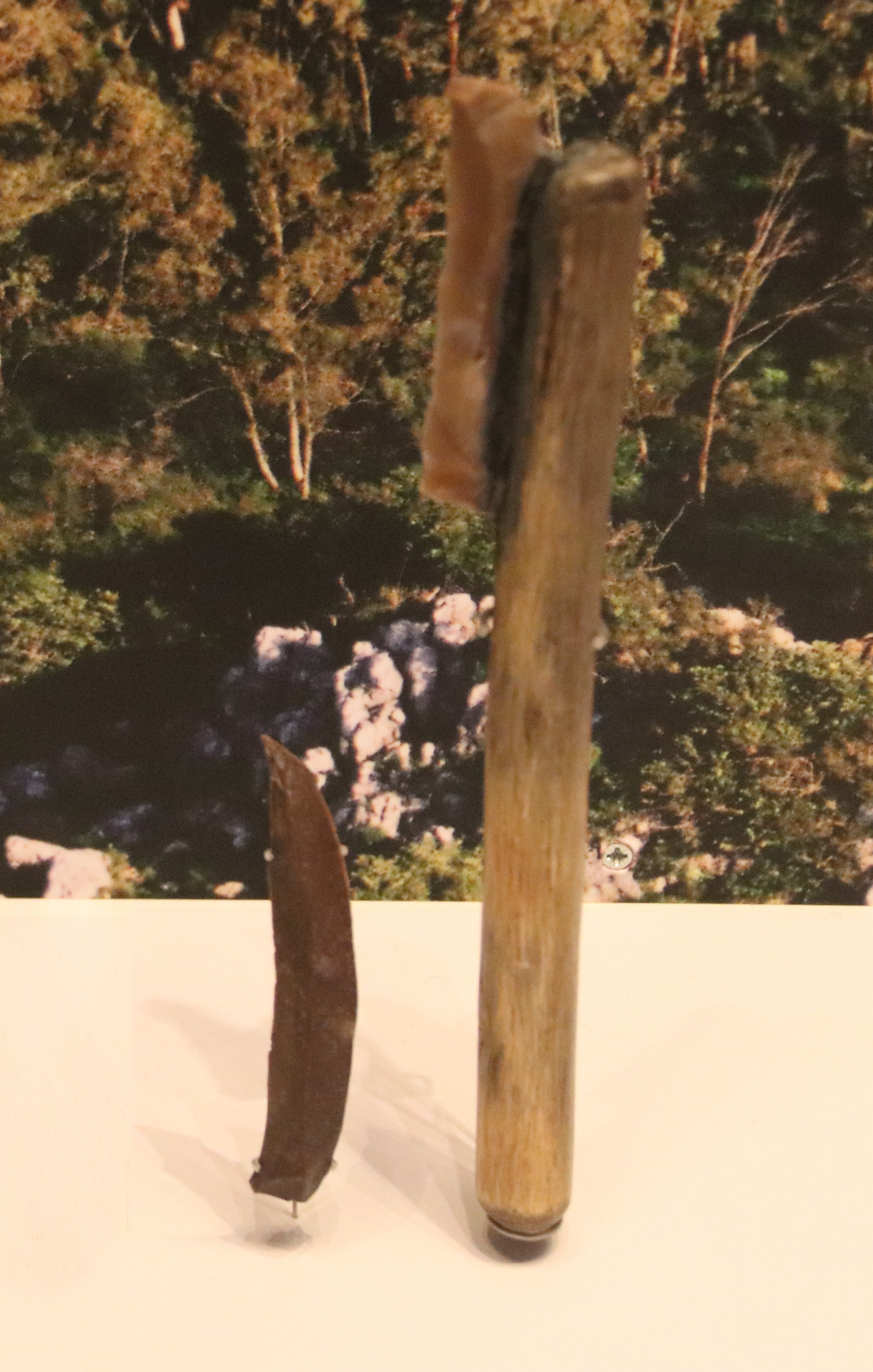
Flint Knives, Ahmarian Culture, Nahal Boqer, 47,000-40,000 BP. Israel Museum.

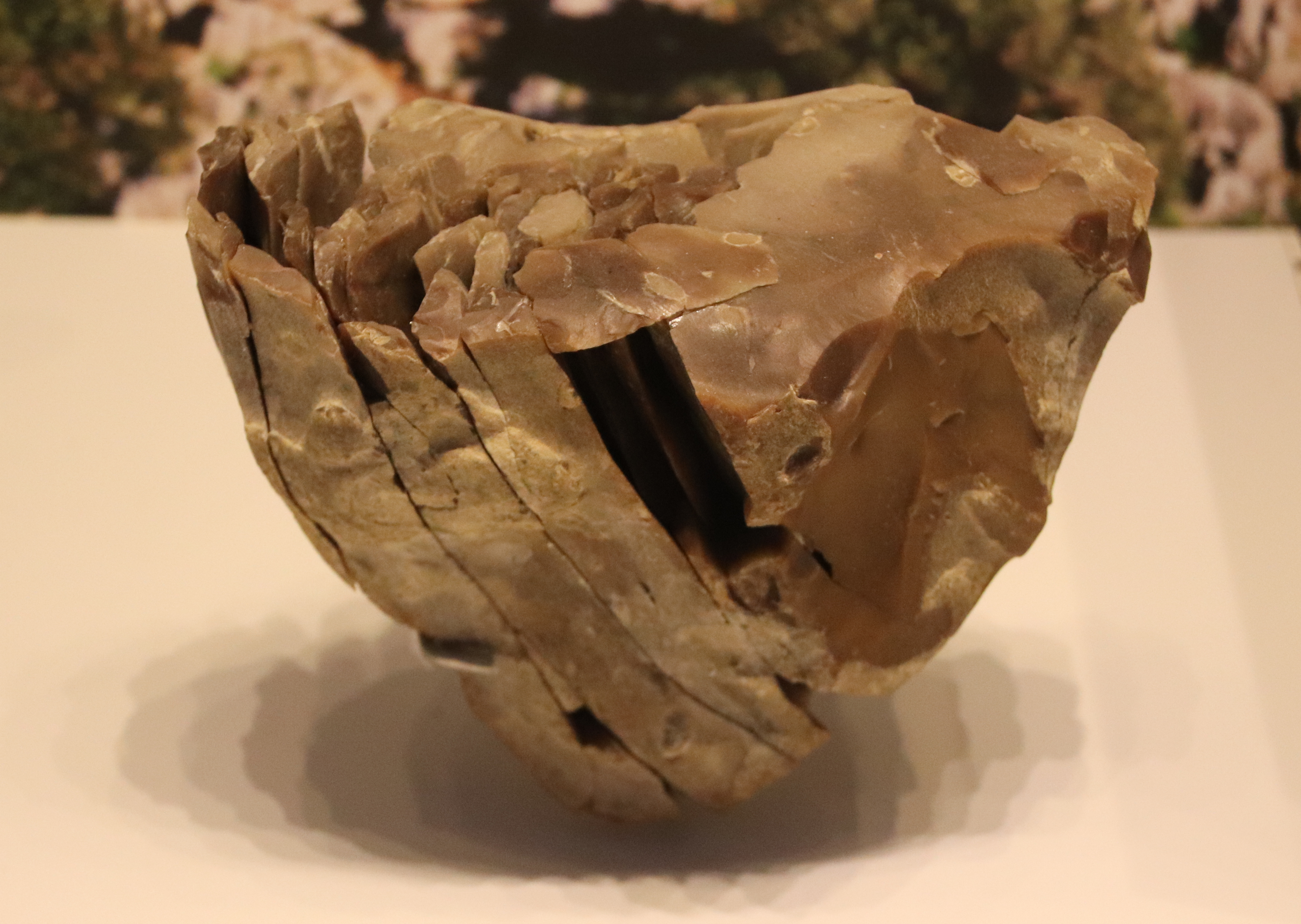
Stone core for making fine blades, Boqer Tachtit, Negev, Israel, circa 40,000 BP.

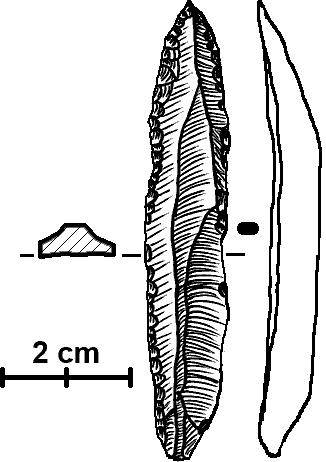
El-Wad points are typical of the Ahmarian culture.

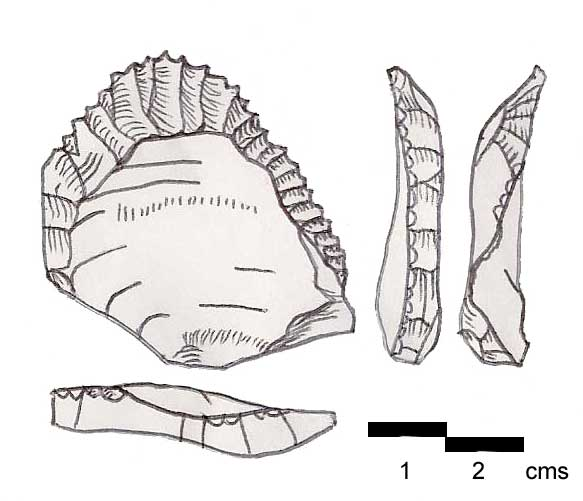
Ksar Akil flake made by Levallois technique. Found on the surface at Ksar Akil, Lebanon. Another point type typical of the Ahmarian culture (Northern Facies).

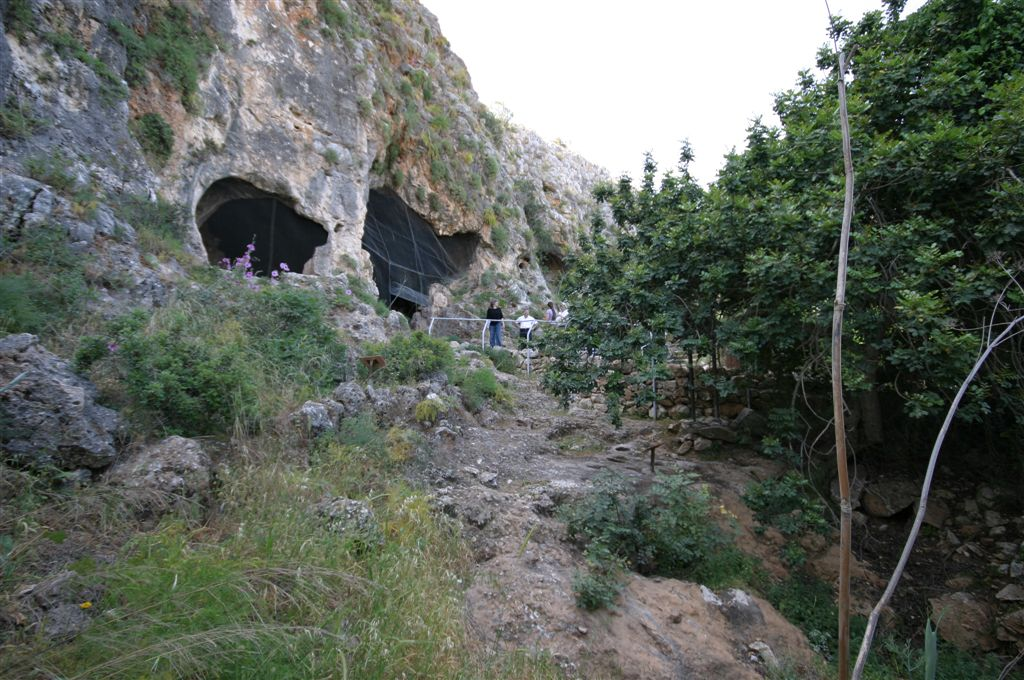
Entrance to el-Wad Cave, an important Ahmarian site

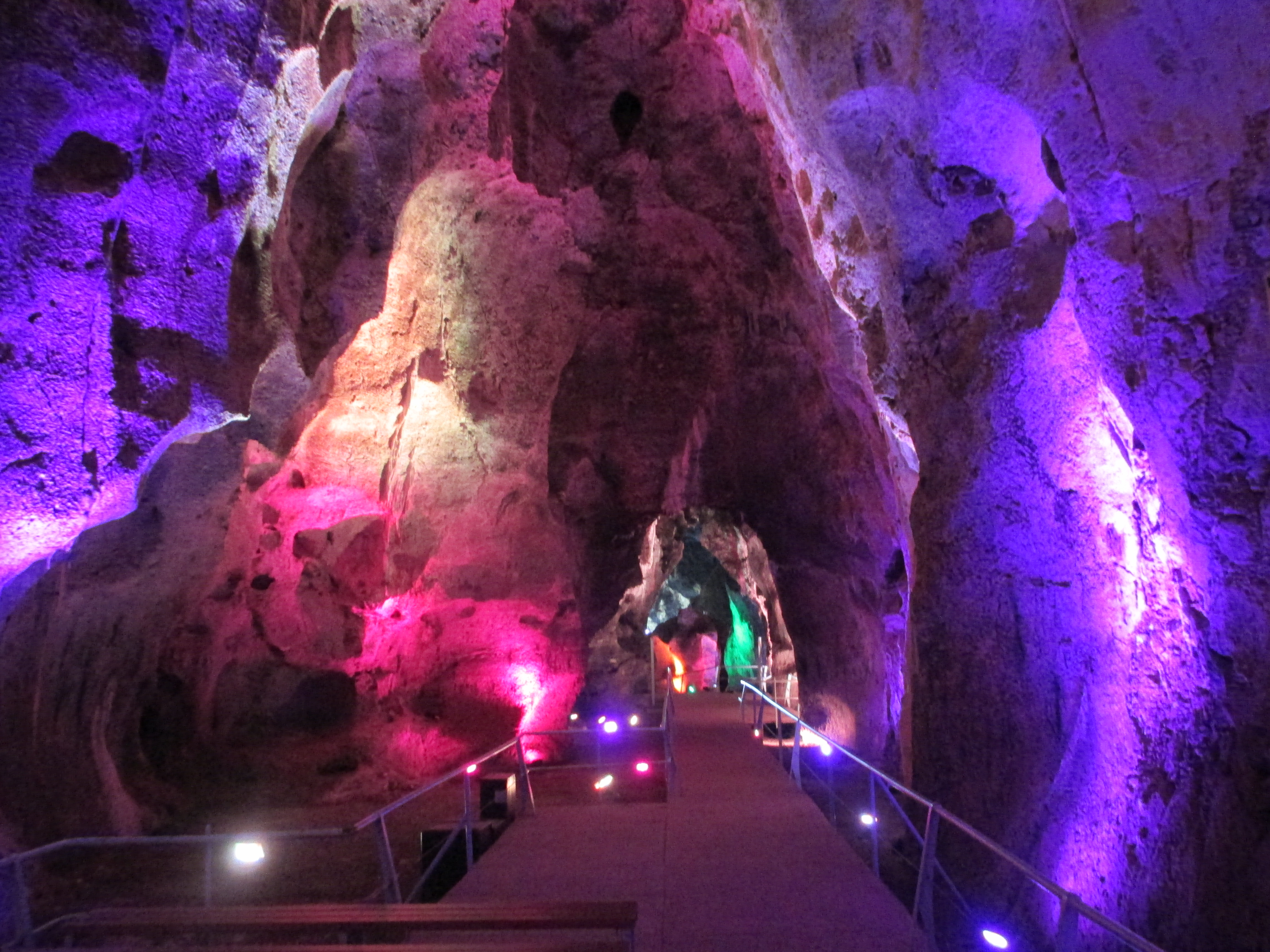
Inside of el-Wad Cave.

== Sites ==
- Erq el-Ahmar (type site)
- Manot Cave
- Boker Tachtit
- Nahal Boqer
- El-Wad (Mount Carmel, Israel)
- Ksar Akil (Ahmarian Northern Facies, Lebanon)
