= Manat =

Manat may refer to:

- Azerbaijani manat, the currency of Azerbaijan
- Turkmen manat, the currency of Turkmenistan
- Manat (goddess), the goddess of fate and destiny in pre-Islamic Arabia
- Manat language of Papua New Guinea
- 5601 Squadron (Israel), or Manat, a unit of the Israeli Air Force
- Manat Wongwat (born 1960), Royal Thai Air Force officer

== See also ==
- Manot (disambiguation)
