= Ksar Akil =

Upper Paleolithic site in Lebanon

- Ksar 'Aqil
- location in Lebanon
- 33.91185°N 35.60325°E
- Type: Rock shelter
- Periods: Middle Palaeolithic, Upper Palaeolithic, Epipaleolithic (Levant)
- Cultures: Transitional/Initial Upper Palaeolithic, Ahmarian Northern Facies, Levantine Aurignacian
- Location: 10 km (6.2 mi) northeast of Beirut

Site notes
- Excavation dates: 1937–1938, 1947–1948, 1969–1975
- Archaeologists: J.G. Doherty: Boston College, J.F. Ewing: Fordham University, Jacques Tixier: CNRS
- Public access: Yes

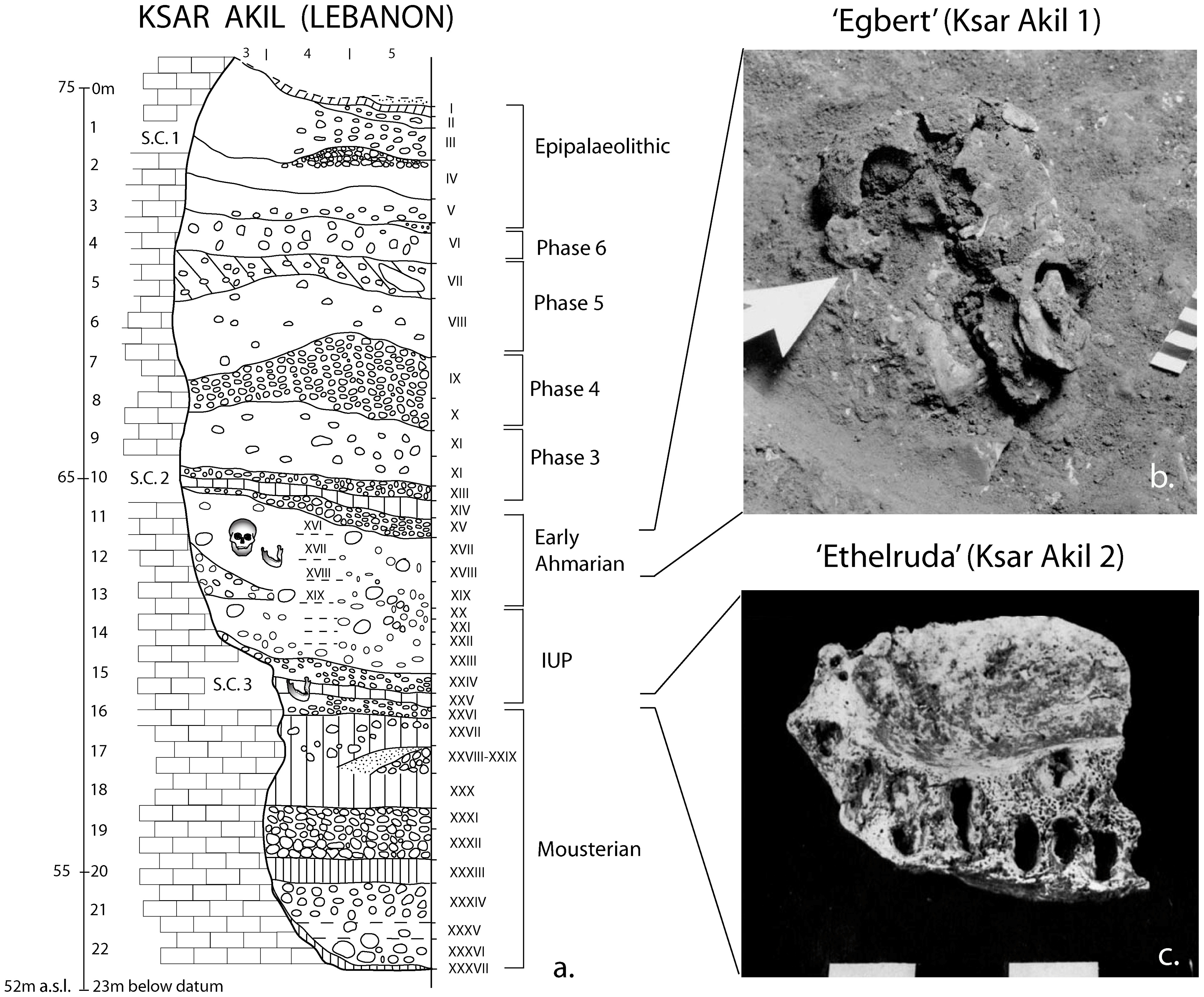
Layer sequence at Ksar Akil, and discovery of two fossils of Homo sapiens, dated to 40,800 to 39,200 years BP for "Egbert", and 42,400–41,700 BP for "Ethelruda".

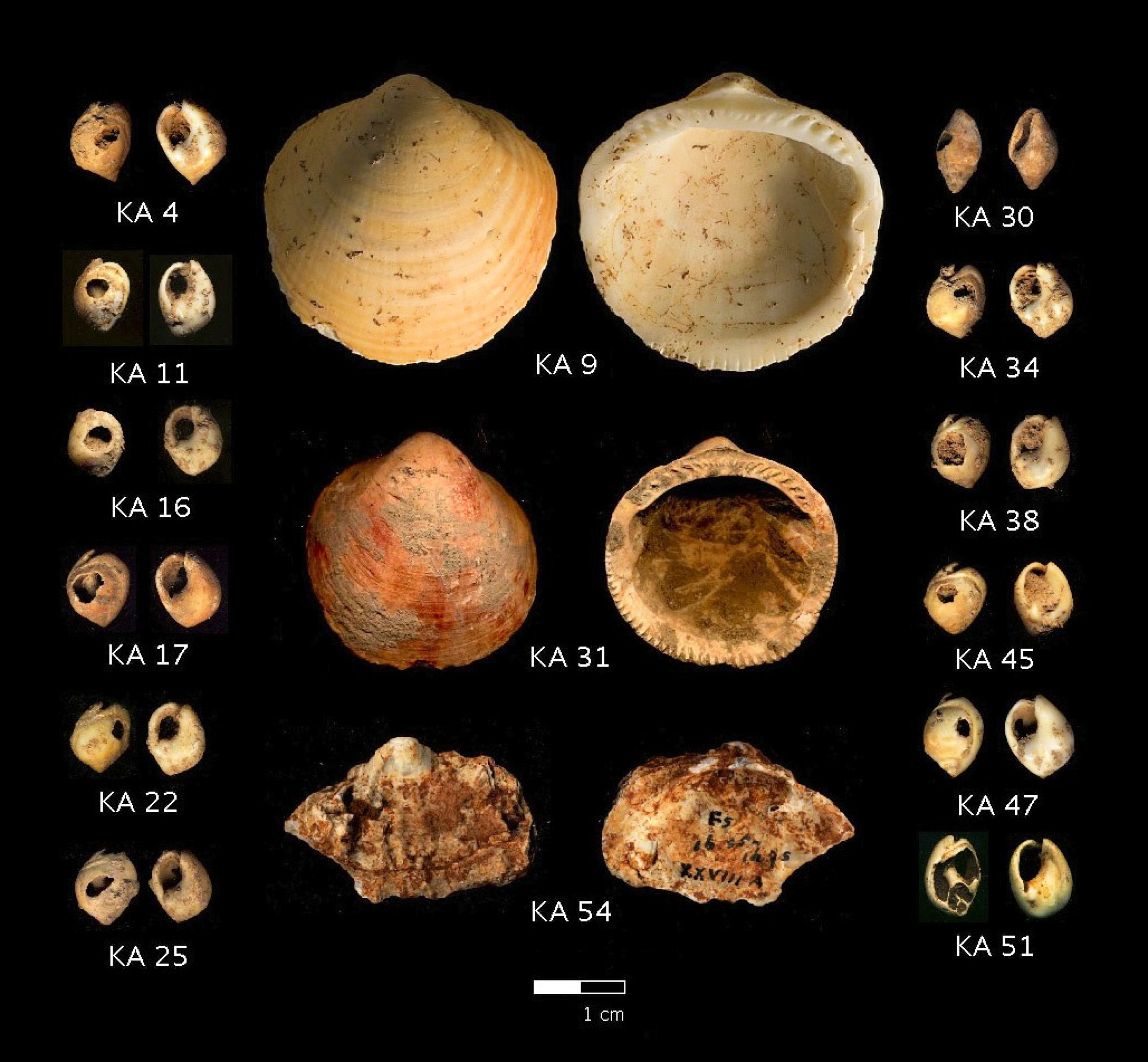
Snail and Mollusca shells found in Ksar Akil

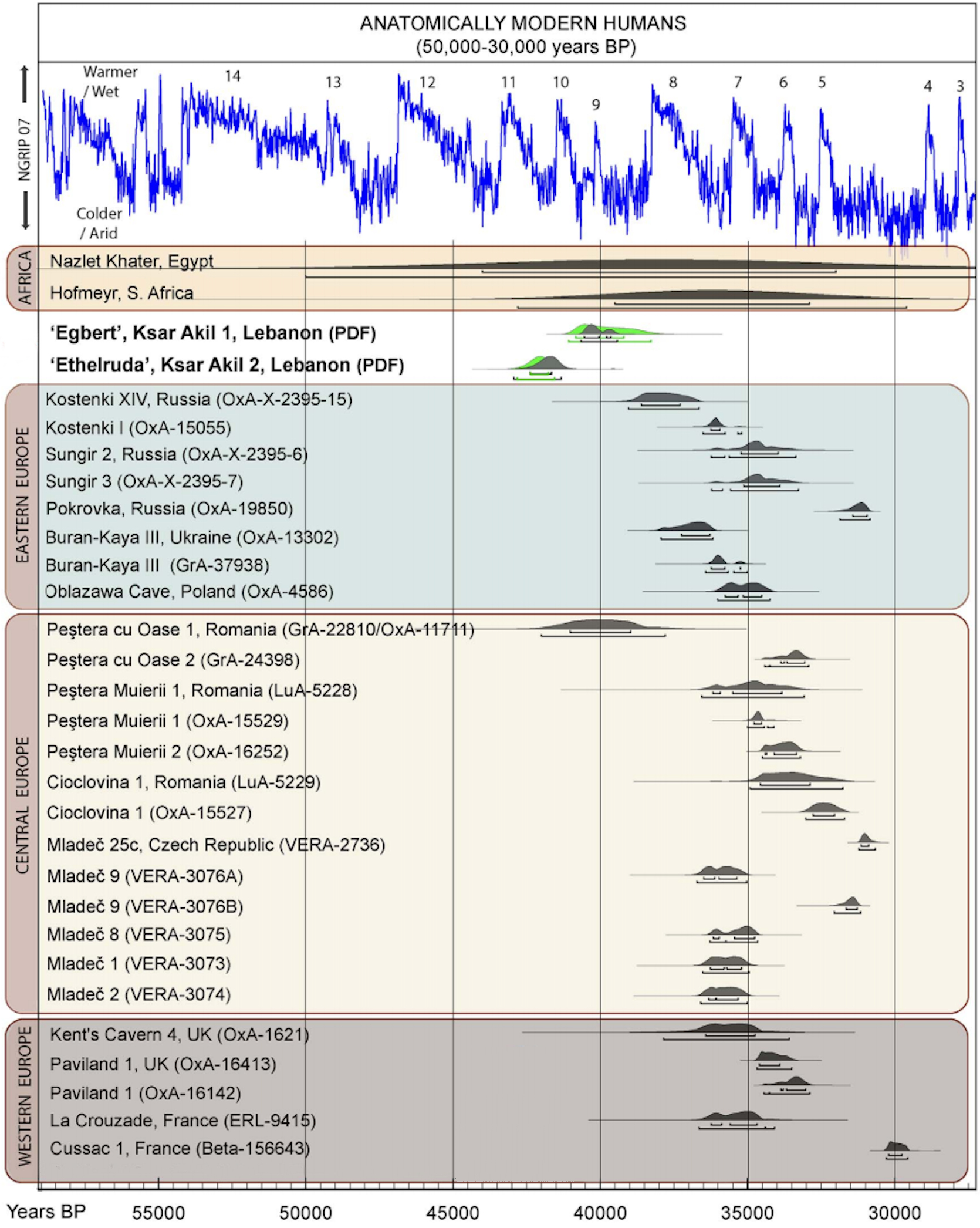
Anatomically Modern Humans known archaeological remains in Europe and Africa, directly dated, calibrated carbon dates as of 2013.

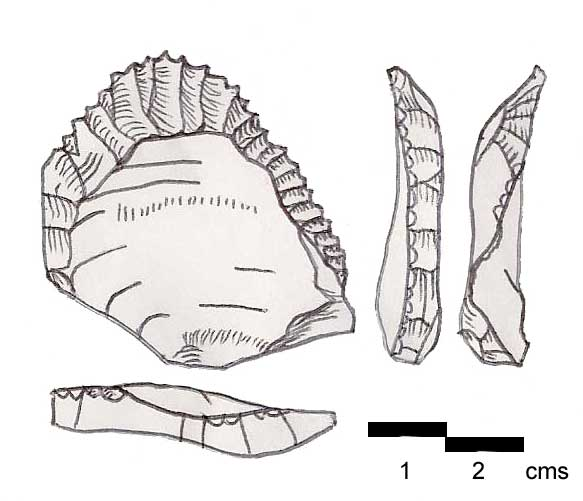
Ksar Akil Flake made by Levallois technique. Found on the surface at Ksar Akil, Lebanon. Blue-grey jurassic flint that patinates to white.

Ksar Akil (also Ksar 'Akil or Ksar Aqil) is an archaeological site 10 km (6.2 mi) northeast of Beirut in Lebanon. It is located about 800 m (2,600 ft) west of Antelias spring on the north bank of the northern tributary of the Wadi Antelias. It is a large rock shelter below a steep limestone cliff.

It was first noticed by Godefroy Zumoffen in 1900 and first studied by A. E. Day in 1926 then first systematically excavated by J.G. Doherty, S.J., and J.F. Ewing, S.J., in 1937–1938 and again in 1947–1948, then later by Jacques Tixier in 1969–1975 before research was interrupted by the Lebanese Civil War.

Excavations showed occupational deposits reaching down to a depth of 23.6 m (77 ft) with one of the longest sequences of Paleolithic flint industries ever found in the Middle East. The first level of 8 m (26 ft) contained Upper Levallois-Mousterian remains with long and triangular Lithic flakes. The level above this showed industries accounting for all six stages of the Upper Paleolithic. An Emireh point was found at the first stage of this level (XXIV), at around 15.2 m (50 ft) below datum, in association with the hominin mandible Ksar Akil 2. Studies by Hooijer showed Capra and Dama were dominant in the fauna along with Stephanorhinus in later Levalloiso-Mousterian levels.

It is assumed to be one of the earliest known sites containing Upper Paleolithic technologies including Ahmarian cultural objects. Artifacts recovered from the site include Ksar Akil flakes, the main type of tool found at the site, along with pierced shells and chipped edge modifications that suggest these have been used as pendants or beads. This indicates that the inhabitants were among the first in Western Eurasia to use personal ornaments. Results from radiocarbon dating indicate that the early humans may have lived at the site approximately 45,000 years ago or earlier. The presence of personal ornaments at Ksar Akil is suggestive of modern human behavior. The findings of ornaments at the site are contemporaneous with ornaments found at Late Stone Age sites such as Enkapune Ya Muto.

The site was rescued from burial under the sludge of gravel-making machines in 1964 by the Department of Antiquities, although is mostly unrecognizable due to quarrying operations with its talus buried under tons of soil.

Aside from 10 teeth from Üçağızlı Cave in southern Turkey, Ksar Akil is the only site with hominin remains from the Early Upper Paleolithic and Initial Upper Paleolithic in the Levant discovered so far.

== Hominin remains ==
=== Ksar Akil 1: "Egbert" ===
A complete skeleton of a juvenile Homo sapiens, referred to as Ksar Akil 1, or more commonly known as Egbert, was discovered in level XVII at 11.6 m (38 ft) cemented into breccia. At the time of death, Egbert is estimated to have been 7 to 9 years old, and due to its small size, may have been female. Egbert was covered by a pile of cobbles, which may indicate deliberate burial. A second maxilla and some rib fragments were discovered nearby the burial, which indicates a second individual may also have been buried in the same place.

Egbert is known only from descriptions, photographs, and reconstructed casts of the skull, now in the National Museum of Beirut, after being studied in America. Ewing gave Egbert's skull to the National Museum of Beirut, and it's unknown what he did with the rest of the skeleton, but both parts became subsequently lost.

Radiocarbon dating and Bayesian modelling supports an age range of 40,800 to 39,200 years BP for Egbert.

=== Ksar Akil 2: "Ethelruda" ===
In 1947 a fragment of a maxilla, designated Ksar Akil 2, and referred to as Ethelruda, was discovered in material from level XXVI or XXV, at around 15 m (49 ft), which is stratigraphically deeper than Egbert. The layer that Ksar Akil 2 was found in is the start of the Initial Upper Paleolithic in the Levant. An Emireh point was also found in this level.

Ethelruda was thought to be lost for many years, but was relocated in storage at the National Museum of Beirut.

The maxilla was originally described as a "Neanderthaloid" adult female on the basis of its similarity to fossils from Tabun I, Skhul IV and V, Gibraltar and La Chapelle-aux-Saints 1. Some have since questioned these similarities. For instance, due to its small size and tooth sockets, Ksar Akil 2 has been described as similar to the maxilla Skhul V, which was originally thought to be a Neanderthal, but is now considered to be an archaic Homo sapiens. On the other hand, the nasal floor is depressed, and the specimen lacks a canine fossa, both of which are features of Neanderthals. The original illustrations of this material have proved insufficient to prove for certain whether Ethelruda is Homo sapiens or Neanderthal or a hybrid.

Radiocarbon dating and Bayesian modelling supports an age range of 42.4–41.7 ka BP for Ethelruda.

== Monographs ==
- Bergman, C. A. 1987. Ksar Akil, Lebanon: A Technological and Typological Analysis of the Later Palaeolithic Levels. Volume II. BAR International Series 329.
- Bergman, C. A. and L. Copeland (eds.) 1986. I. Azoury Ksar Akil, Lebanon: A Technological and Typological Analysis of the Transitional and Early Upper Palaeolithic Levels of Ksar Akil and Abu Halka. Volume I. BAR International Series 289 (i and ii).
- Leder, D. 2014. Technological and Typological change at the Middle to Upper Plaeolithic boundary in Lebanon. Universitätsforschungen zur Prähistorischen Archäologie. Habelt Verlag.

== Articles ==
- Bergman, C. A. 2004. "Twisted Debitage and the Levantine Aurignacian Problem". in A. Belfer-Cohen and A.N. Goring-Morris (eds.) More than Meets the Eye: Studies on Upper Palaeolithic Diversity in the Near East. Oxbow Press, Oxford: 185–195.
- Ohnuma, K. and C. A. Bergman 1990. "A technological study of the Upper Palaeolithic levels XXV-VI from Ksar Akil, Lebanon". in P. Mellars and C. Stringer (eds.) The Origins and Dispersal of Modern Man. Cambridge University Press: 91–138.
- Bergman, C. A. and C. B. Stringer 1989. "Fifty years after: Egbert, an Upper Palaeolithic Juvenile from Ksar Akil, Lebanon". Paléorient 15/2: 99–111.
- Bergman, C. A. 1988. "Ksar Akil and the Upper Palaeolithic of the Levant". Préhistoire du Levant 2 Paléorient 14/2: 201–210.
- Bergman, C. A. and N. Goring-Morris 1987. "Conference: The Levantine Aurignacian with special reference to Ksar Akil, Lebanon". Paléorient 13/1: 142–145.
- Bergman, C. A. 1987. "Hafting and use of bone and antler points from Ksar Akil, Lebanon". in D. Stordeur (ed.) La Main et l'Outil. Travaux de la Maison de l'Orient Méditerranéen, Lyon 15: 117–126.
- Bergman, C. A. and K. Ohnuma 1987. "The Upper Palaeolithic Sequence of Ksar Akil, Lebanon". Berytus XXV: 13–40.
- Leder, D. 2016. "Core reduction strategies at the Initial Upper Palaeolithic sites Ksar Akil and Abou Halka in Lebanon". Lithics: the Journal of the Lithic Studies Society 37: 33–53.
