= Kebaran culture =

Archaeological culture in the Eastern Mediterranean

Kebaran
- Geographical range: Levant
- Period: Upper Paleolithic
- Dates: c. 23,000 – c. 15,000 BP
- Type site: Kebara Cave
- Major sites: Ohalo II, HaYonim Cave
- Preceded by: Levantine Aurignacian
- Followed by: Mushabian culture Natufian culture

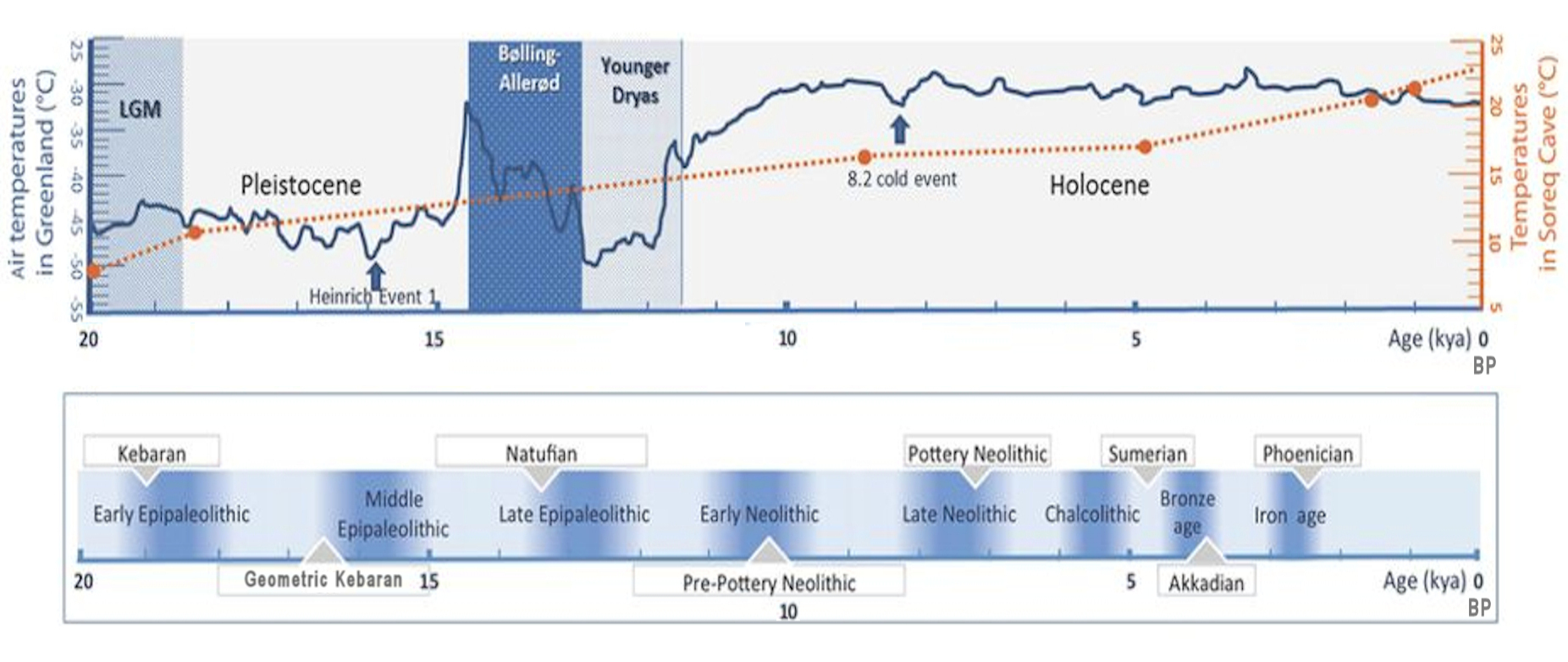
The Kebaran corresponds to the period of progressive warming at the end of the Pleistocene, which followed the Last Glacial Maximum (LGM). Climate and Post-Glacial expansion in the Near East, based on the analysis of Greenland ice cores.

The Kebaran culture, also known as the 'Early Near East Epipalaeolithic', is an archaeological culture of the Eastern Mediterranean dating from c. 23,000 to 15,000 Before Present (BP). Its type site is Kebara Cave, south of Haifa. The Kebaran was produced by a highly mobile nomadic population, composed of hunters and gatherers in the Levant and Sinai areas who used microlithic tools.

== Overview ==
The Kebaran is the first phase of the Epipalaeolithic in the Levant. Kebaran stone tool assemblages are characterized by small, geometric microliths, and are thought to have lacked the specialized grinders and pounders found in later Near Eastern cultures. Small stone tools called microliths and retouched bladelets can be found for the first time. The microliths of this culture period differ greatly from the Aurignacian artifacts.

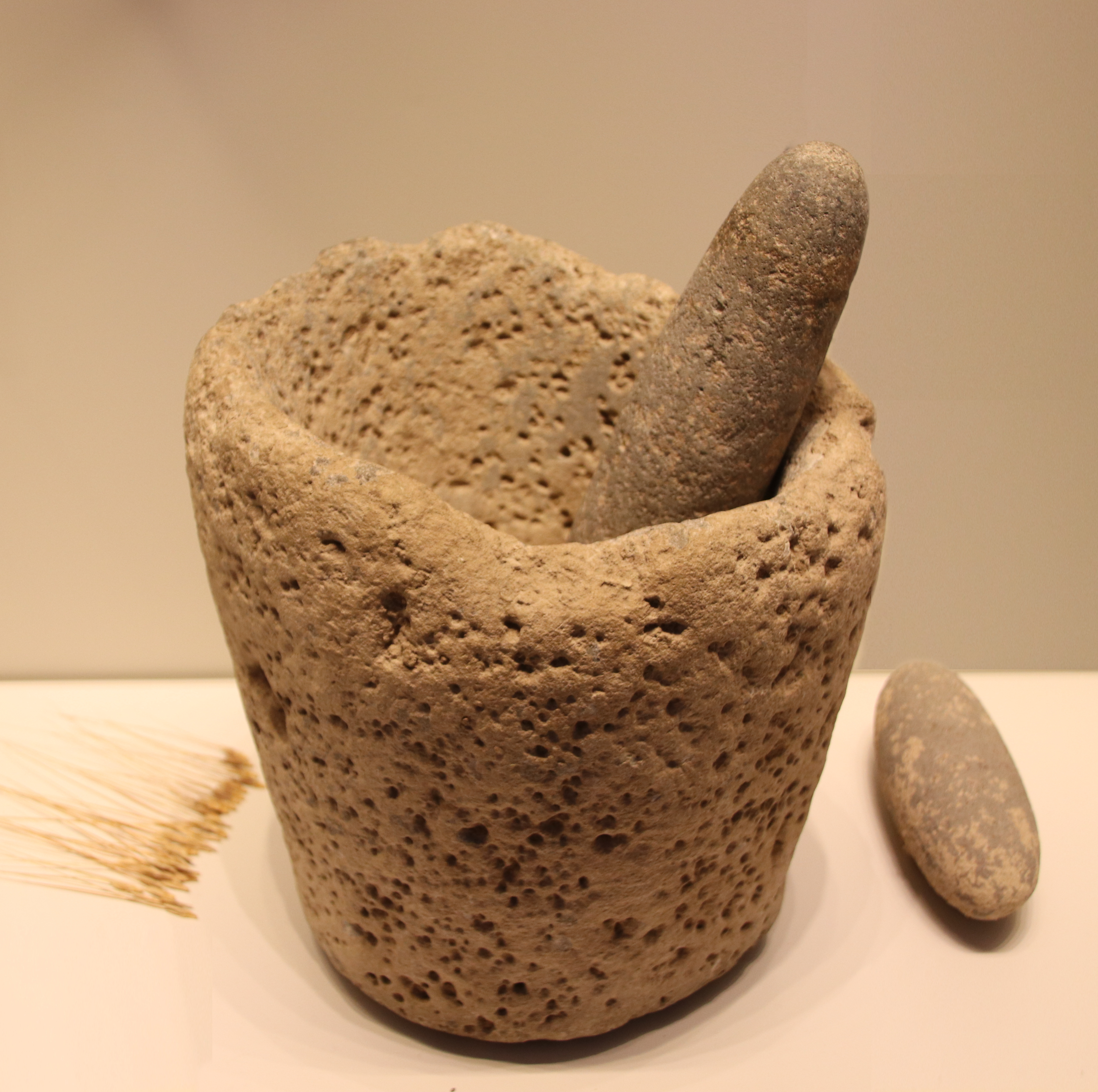
Stone Age stone mortar and pestle, Kebaran culture, 22,000-18,000 BP

The Kebaran is preceded by the final phase of the Upper Paleolithic Levantine Aurignacian (also known as the Athlitian or Antelian) and followed by the proto-agrarian Natufian culture of the Epipalaeolithic. The appearance of the Kebaran culture, of microlithic type implies a significant rupture in the cultural continuity of Levantine Upper Paleolithic. The Kebaran culture, with its use of microliths, is associated with the use of the bow and arrow and the domestication of the dog. The Kebaran is also characterised by the earliest collecting of wild cereals, known due to the uncovering of grain grinding tools. It was the first step towards the Neolithic Revolution. The Kebaran people are believed to have practiced dispersal to upland environments in the summer, and aggregation in caves and rock shelters near lowland lakes in the winter. This diversity of environments may be the reason for the variety of tools found in their kits.

Situated in the Terminal Pleistocene, the Kebaran is classified as an Epipalaeolithic society. They are generally thought to have been ancestral to the later Natufian culture that occupied much of the same range, who advanced the use of wild grains, building on the Kebaran traits to acquire some symptoms of permanent settlements, agriculture, and hints of civilization.

In the prehistoric site of Ein Gev, the skeleton of a 30-40 year old woman associated with the Kebaran was discovered. The morphological characteristics assigned the individual to a Proto-Mediterranean population, being very similar to the Natufians.

=== Artistic expression ===
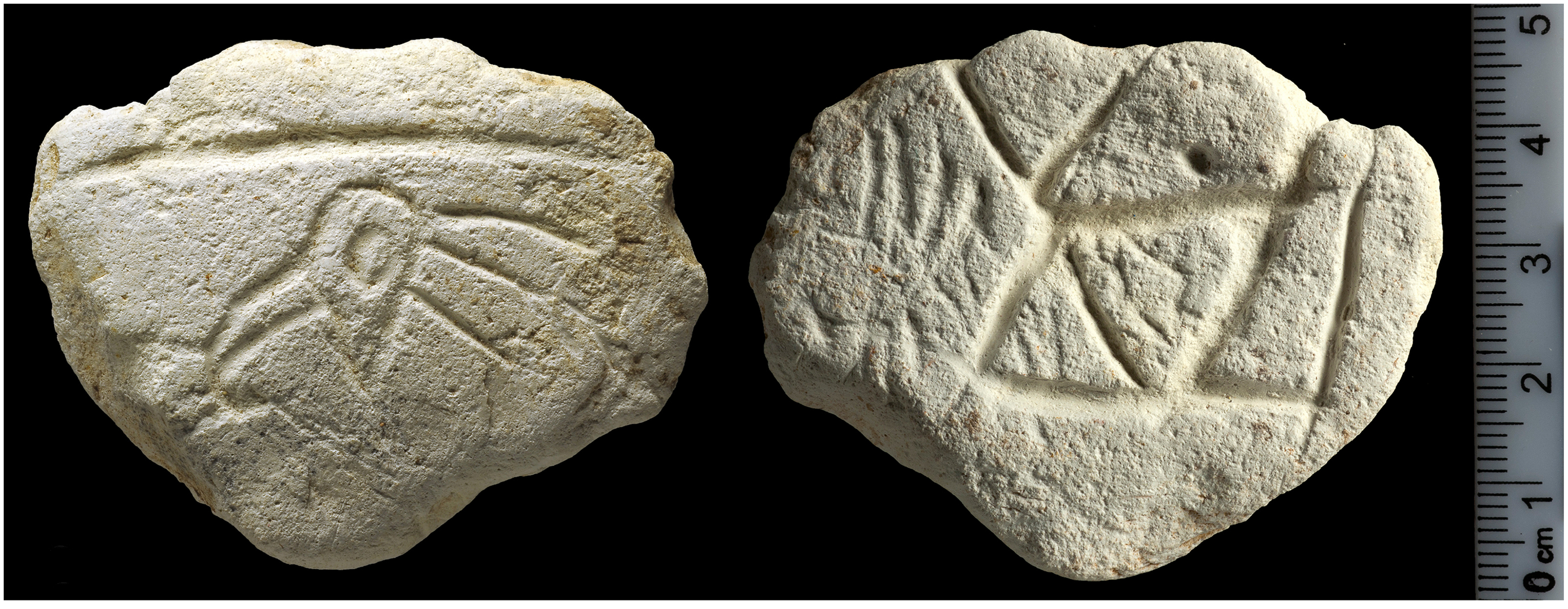
Engraved plaquette with bird image from Ein Qashish South, Jezreel Valley, Israel, Kebaran and Geometric Kebaran ca. 23,000-16,500 BP)

Evidence for symbolic behavior of Late Pleistocene foragers in the Levant has been found in engraved limestone plaquettes from the Epipaleolithic open-air site Ein Qashish South in the Jezreel Valley, Israel. The engravings were uncovered in Kebaran and Geometric Kebaran deposits (ca. 23,000 and ca. 16,500 BP), and include the image of a bird, the first figurative representation known so far from a pre-Natufian Epipaleolithic site in the region, together with geometric motifs such as chevrons, cross-hatchings and ladders. Some of the engravings closely resemble roughly contemporary European finds, and may be interpreted as "systems of notations" or "artificial memory systems" related to the timing of seasonal resources and related important events for nomadic groups.

Similar looking signs and patterns are well known from the context of the local Natufia, a final Epipaleolithic period when sedentary or semi-sedentary foragers started practicing agriculture.

The engravings found in Ein Qashish South involve symbolic conceptualization. They suggest that the figurative and non-figurative images comprise a coherent assemblage of symbols that might have been applied in order to store, share and transmit information related to the social activities and the subsistence of mobile bands. They also suggest a level of social complexity in pre-Natufian foragers in the Levant. The apparent similarity in graphics throughout the Late Pleistocene world and the mode of their application support the possibility that symbolic behavior has a common and much earlier origin.

=== Artifacts ===
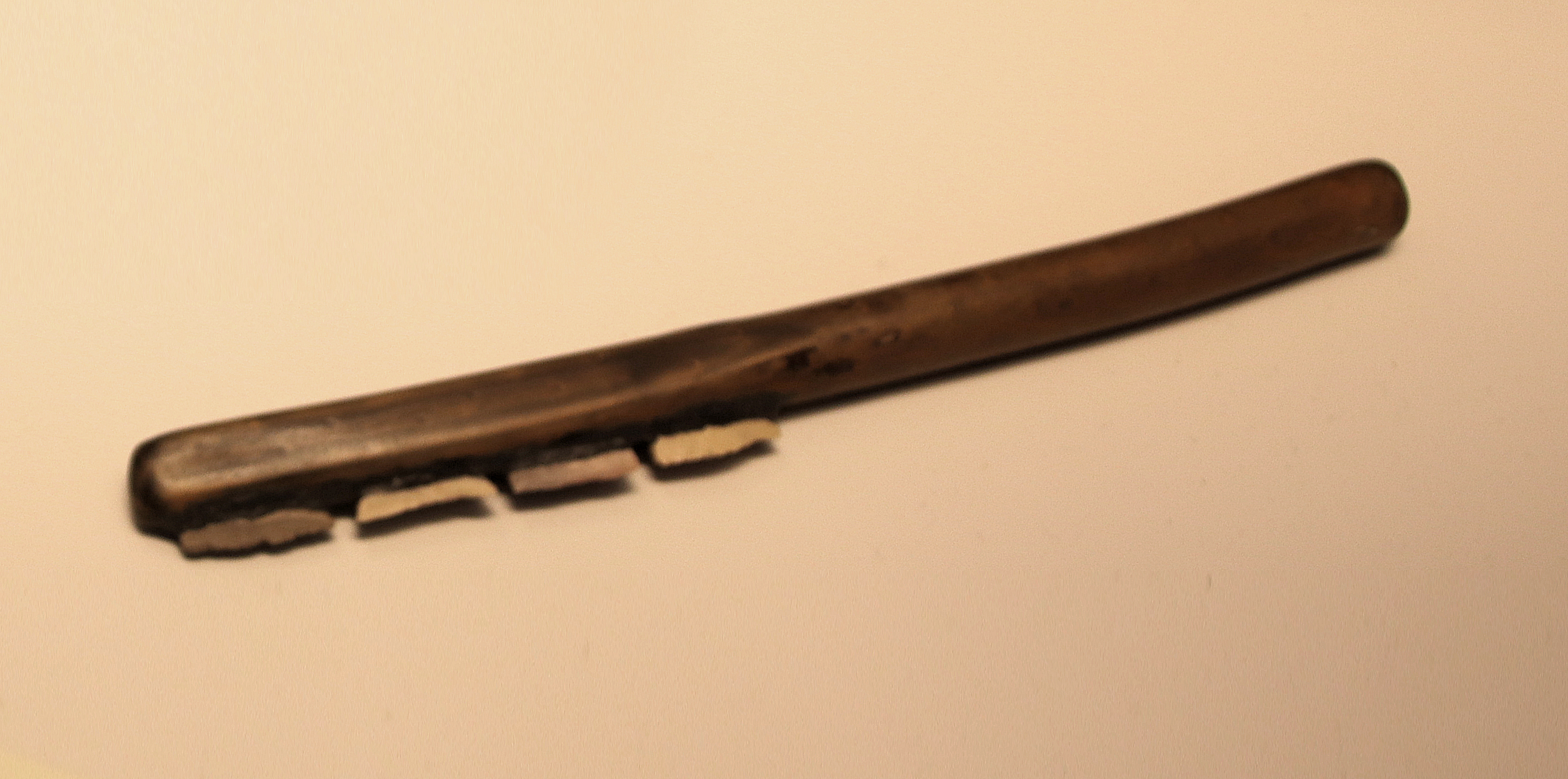
Flint knife, Kebaran culture, 22,000-18,000 BP

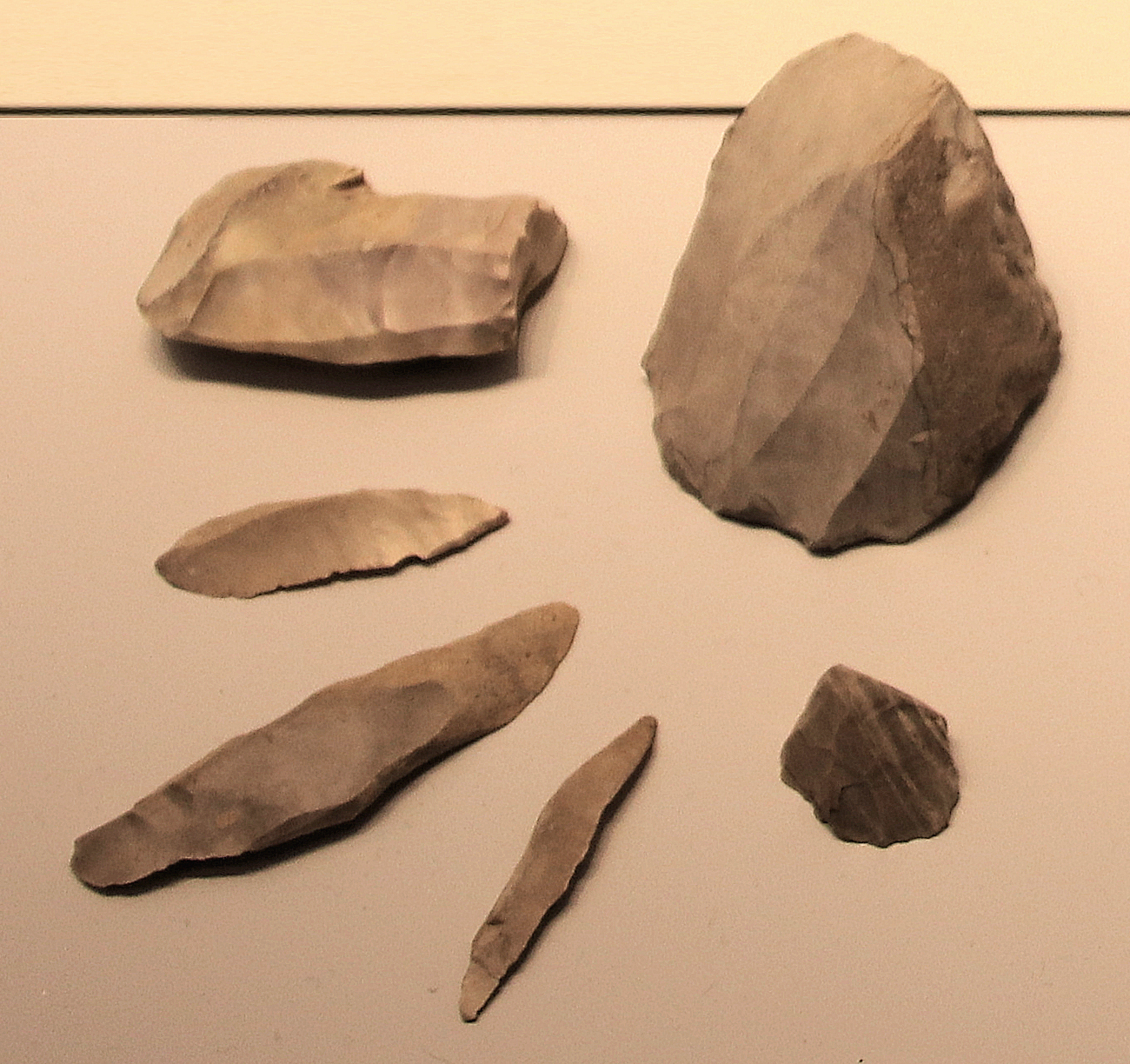
Kebaran culture microliths, 22,000-18,000 BP

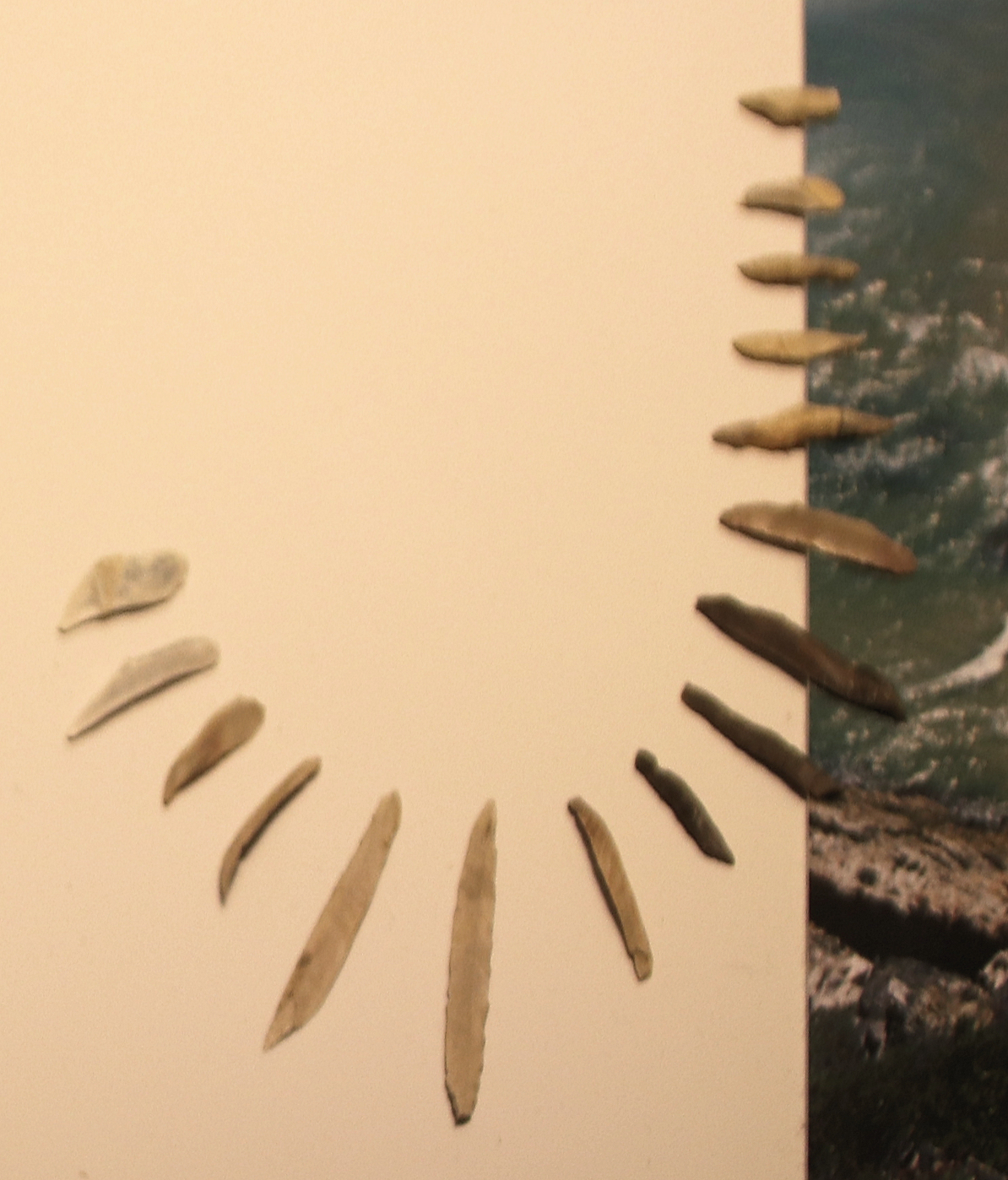
Microlith productions, Kebaran culture, 22,000-18,000 BP

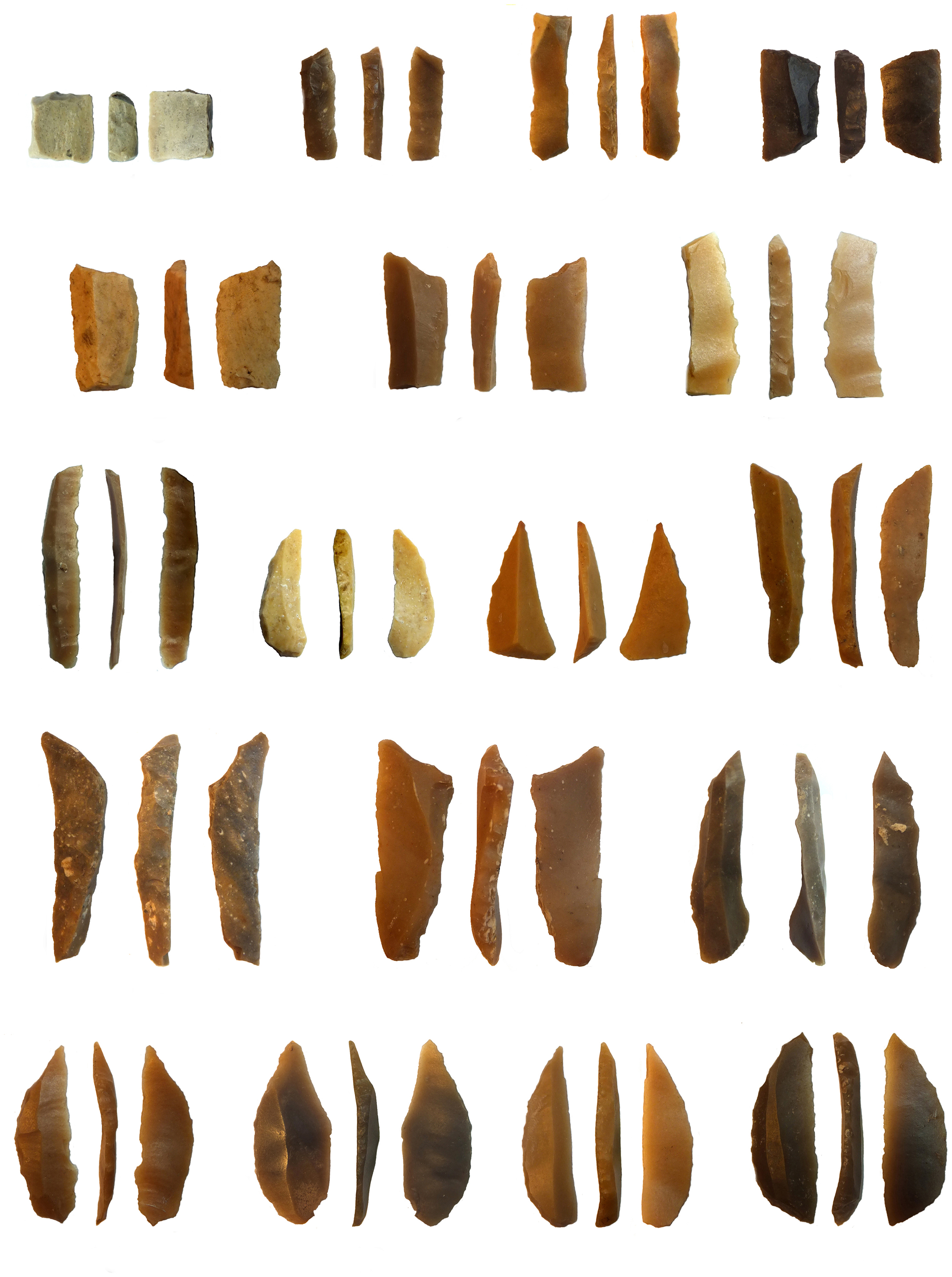
Microlith tools from Ein Qashish South, Jezreel Valley, Israel, Kebaran and Geometric Kebaran deposits (ca. 23ka and ca. 16.5ka BP)

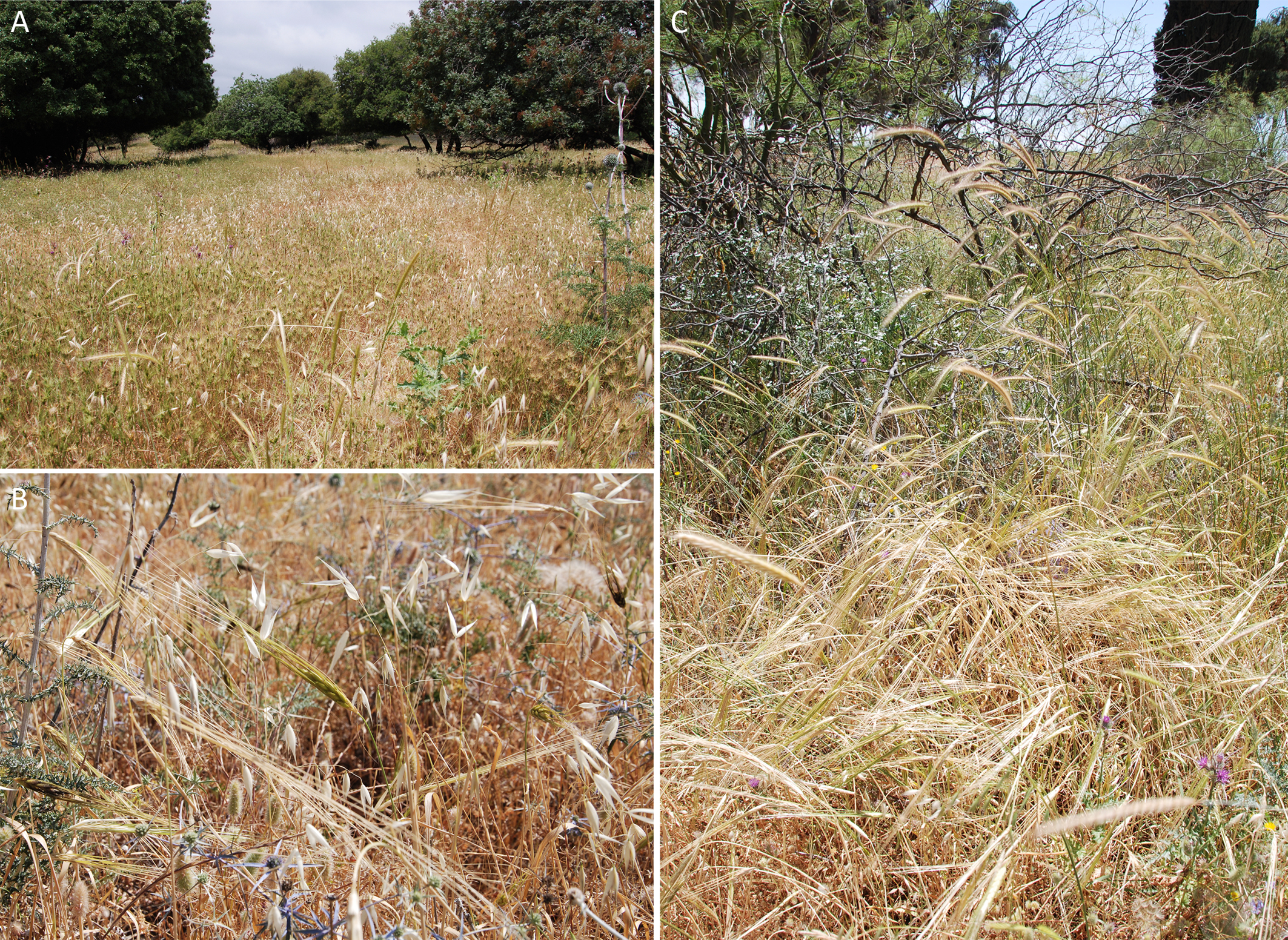
Associations of wild cereals and other wild grasses in northern Israel
