= J. Franklin Ewing =

American Catholic priest

J. Franklin Ewing (October 14, 1905 - May 21, 1968) was an American Catholic priest and anthropologist and director of research services at Fordham University.

Ewing accepted the science of evolution but argued that God had a direct and primary role in the process. Ewing was co-director of an archeological excavation at Ksar Akil in 1948 that unearthed a cranium from a 20,000 year old child that he named "Egbert".

Ewing became a faculty member at Fordham in 1949 as assistant professor of anthropology.
