= Godefroy Zumoffen =

Swiss Jesuit scientist (1848–1928)

Godefroy Zumoffen, SJ (1848 in Salgesch, Switzerland – 1928) was a Swiss Jesuit archaeologist and geologist notable for his work on prehistory in Lebanon.

He is known particularly for pioneering Lebanese archaeology, and for discovering several sites including the Antelias Cave. He produced the first geological map of Lebanon and authored a book about its prehistory, La Phénicie avant les phéniciens: l'âge de la pierre. (Note: transl. Phoenicia Before the Phoenicians: The Stone Age)
