= Levantine Aurignacian =

Upper Paleolithic culture of the Near-Eastern Levant

Levantine Aurignacian culture
- Levantine Aurignacian and contemporary cultures c. 40,000-30,000 BP
- Geographical range: Levant
- Period: Upper Paleolithic
- Dates: c. 35,000 – c. 29,000 BP (calibrated)
- Major sites: HaYonim; Ksar Akil; Manot
- Preceded by: Emiran, Ahmarian
- Followed by: Kebaran (Epipaleolithic)

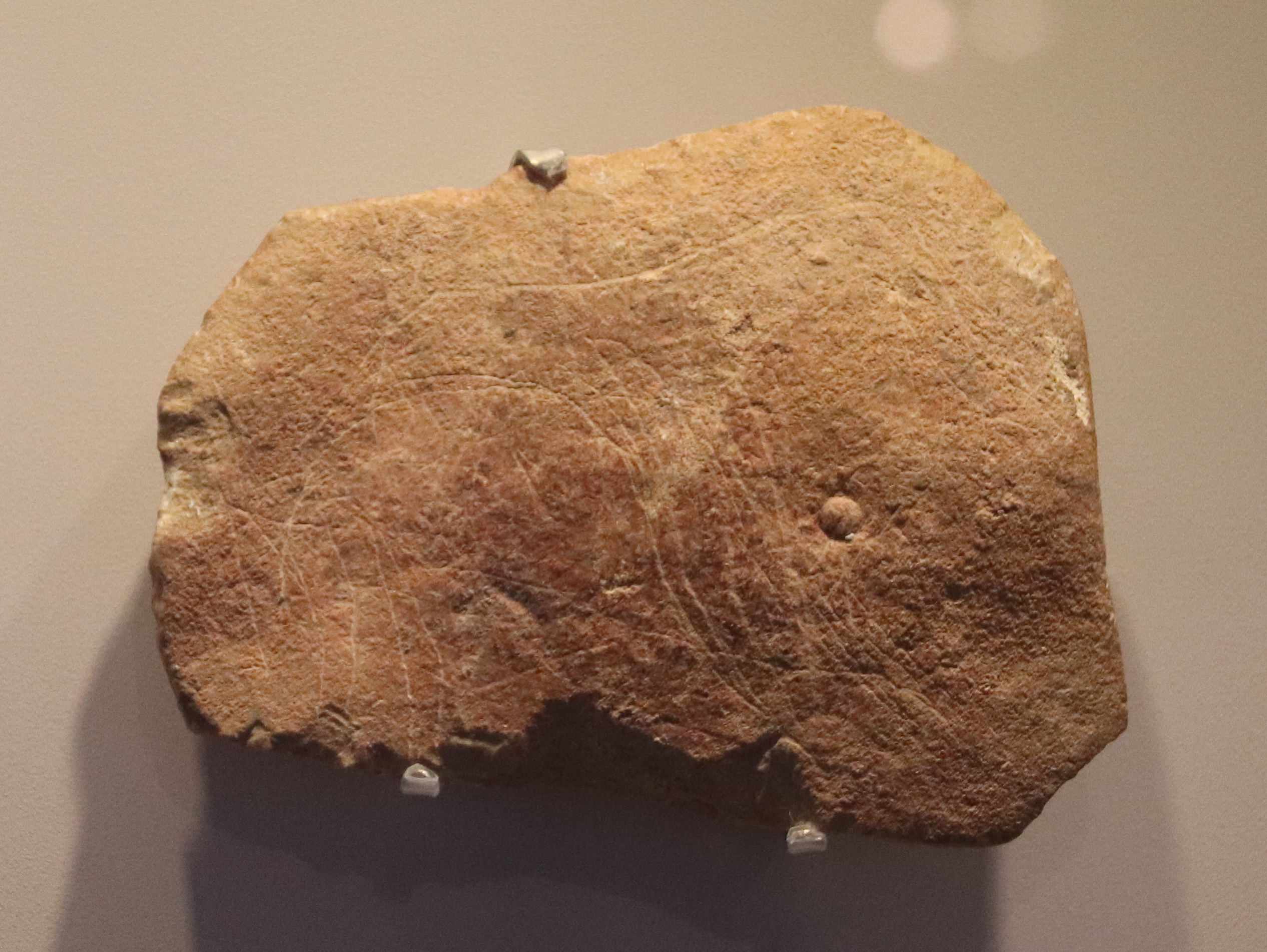
Carving of a horse with traces of ocher painting; 40,000-18,500 BP; from the Hayonim Cave, Aurignacian. Israel Museum (Jerusalem) This may be one of the earliest known manifestations of human art, together with the ocher pieces of Blombos Cave, before the outpouring of parietal art in Europe.

The Levantine Aurignacian (35,000-29,000 BP, calibrated, 32,000-26,000 BP, non-calibrated) is an Upper Paleolithic culture of the Near-Eastern Levant that evolved from the Emiran culture. It was named so because of the similarity of stone tools with the Aurignacian culture in Europe. The Levantine Aurignacian used to be called Lower and Upper Antelian in old sources, from the site of Wadi Antelias in Lebanon. The most important innovation in this period is the incorporation of some typical elements of Aurignacian, like some types of burins and narrow blade points that resemble the European type of Font-Yves.

== Dating ==
Similarities with Aurignacian are found in the manufacture of blades and in the processing of bone tools.

The Levantine Aurignacian follows chronologically the Emiran and Early Ahmarian in the same area of the Near East, and closely related to them.

The carving of a horse with traces of a layer of ocher painting from HaYonim Cave, now in the Israel Museum, is generally categorized as Aurignacian and variously dated to 40,000-18,500 BP. This may be one of the earliest known manifestations of human art, together with the ocher pieces of the Blombos Cave, before the outpouring of parietal art in Europe.

The Levantine Aurignacian is part of the technological shift from the Middle Paleolithic to the Upper Paleolithic, but the arrival of modern humans Homo sapiens in the Levant still predates the Levantine Aurignacian by tens of thousands of years. The earliest Upper Paleolithic entity is the local Ahmarian, with the first full-fledged blade/bladelet technology, to which the Levantine Aurignacian succeeds, possibly after a few thousand years of co-existence. The Emiran period and the Ahmarian period form the very first periods of the Upper Paleolithic, corresponding to the first stages of the expansion of Homo sapiens out of Africa. From this stage, the first modern humans probably migrated to Europe to form the beginning of the European Upper Paleolithic, including the Aurignacian culture. There is a possibility that the Levantine Aurignacian was the result of reverse influence from the European Aurignacian, but this remains unsettled.

== Phases ==
- Upper Paleolithic III (lower Antelian).
- Upper Paleolithic IV (upper Antelian): proliferation of burin types and decrease in the number of Font-Yves points. First and almost only use of bone for tools in the region, very rare in any case.
- Upper Paleolithic V (Athlitian): specialization of Antelian with a comeback of the Chatelperronian knives of the Emiran.

== Succession ==
By the end of the Levantine Aurignacian, gradual changes took place in stone industries. The first phase of the Epipalaeolithic Near East, also known as Kebaran, lasts from 20,000 to 12,150 BP. Small stone tools called microliths and retouched bladelets can be found for the first time. The microliths of this culture period differ greatly from the Aurignacian artifacts.

== Sites ==
- Central Negev sites D14, D18, D22, D27 A, B
- El-Quseir
- HaYonim Cave D
- Kebara Cave D
- Ksar Akil, shelter VII
- Raqefet Cave, level III-IV
- Umm el Tlel

== Artifacts ==
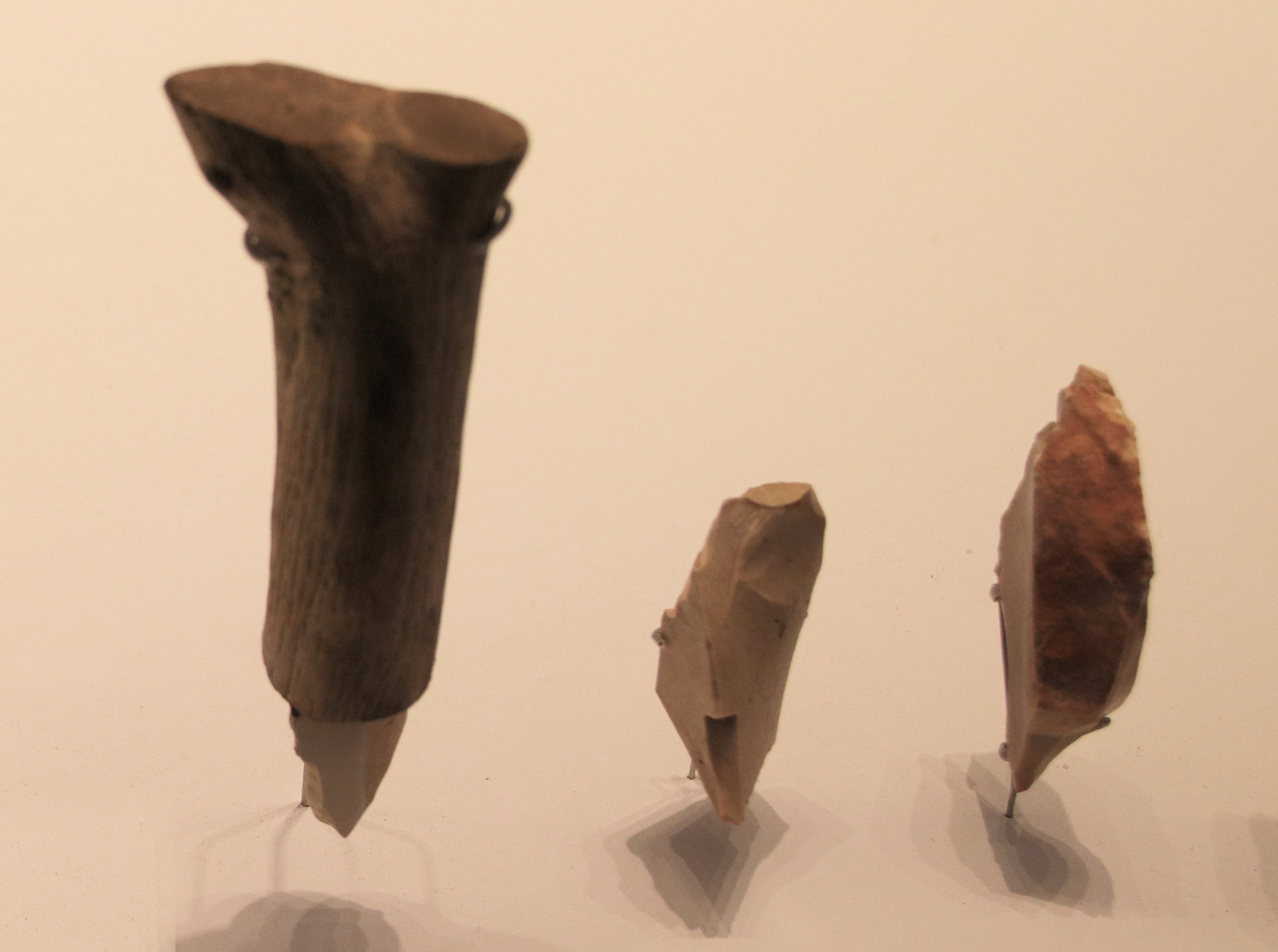
Mousterian & Aurignacian Cultures, stone burins used for incising stone and wood, Qafzeh, Hayonim, el-Wad Cave, 250,000-22,000 BP Israel

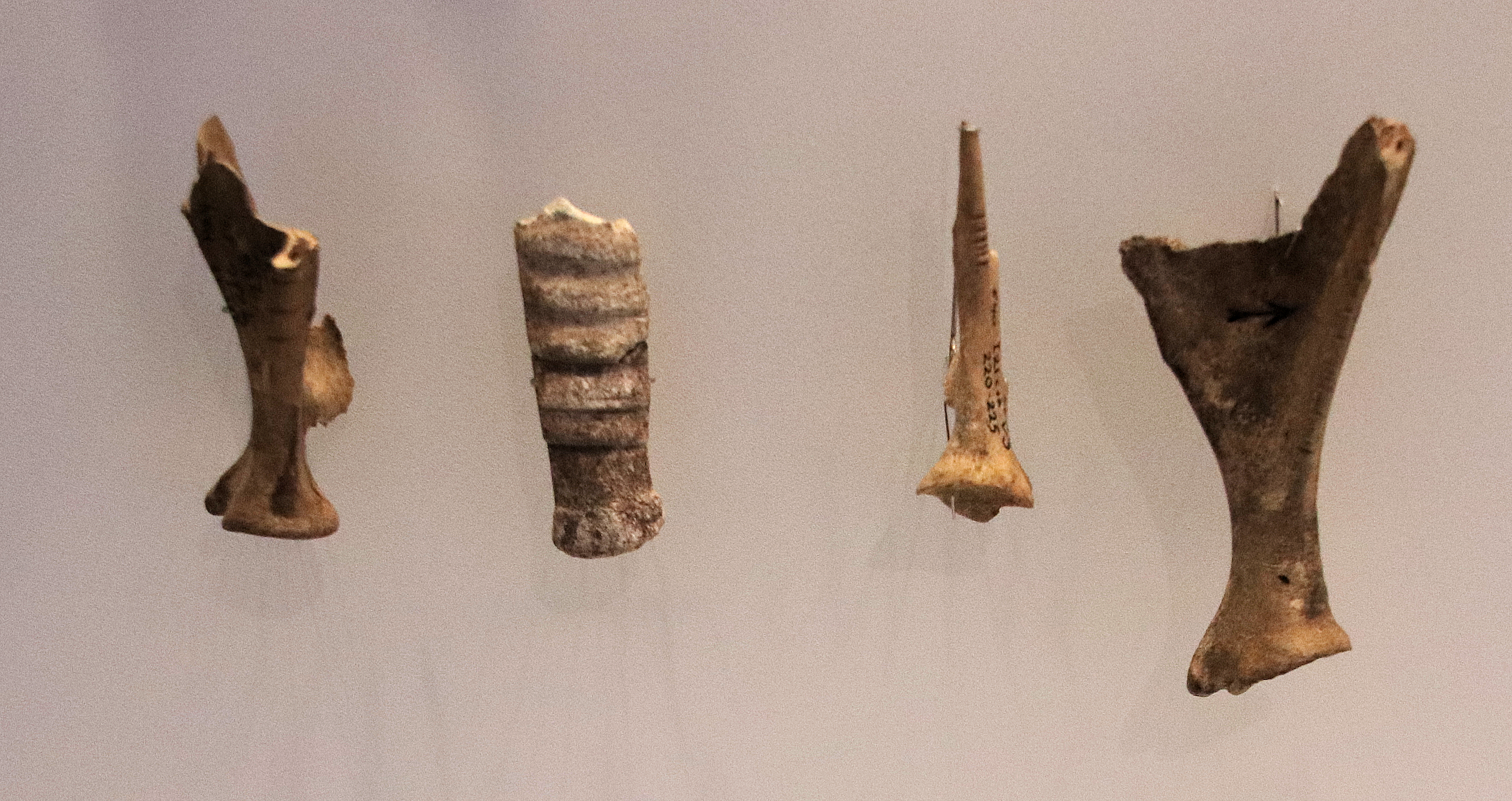
Aurignacian Culture incised animal bones, Hayonim Cave, 28,000 BP.

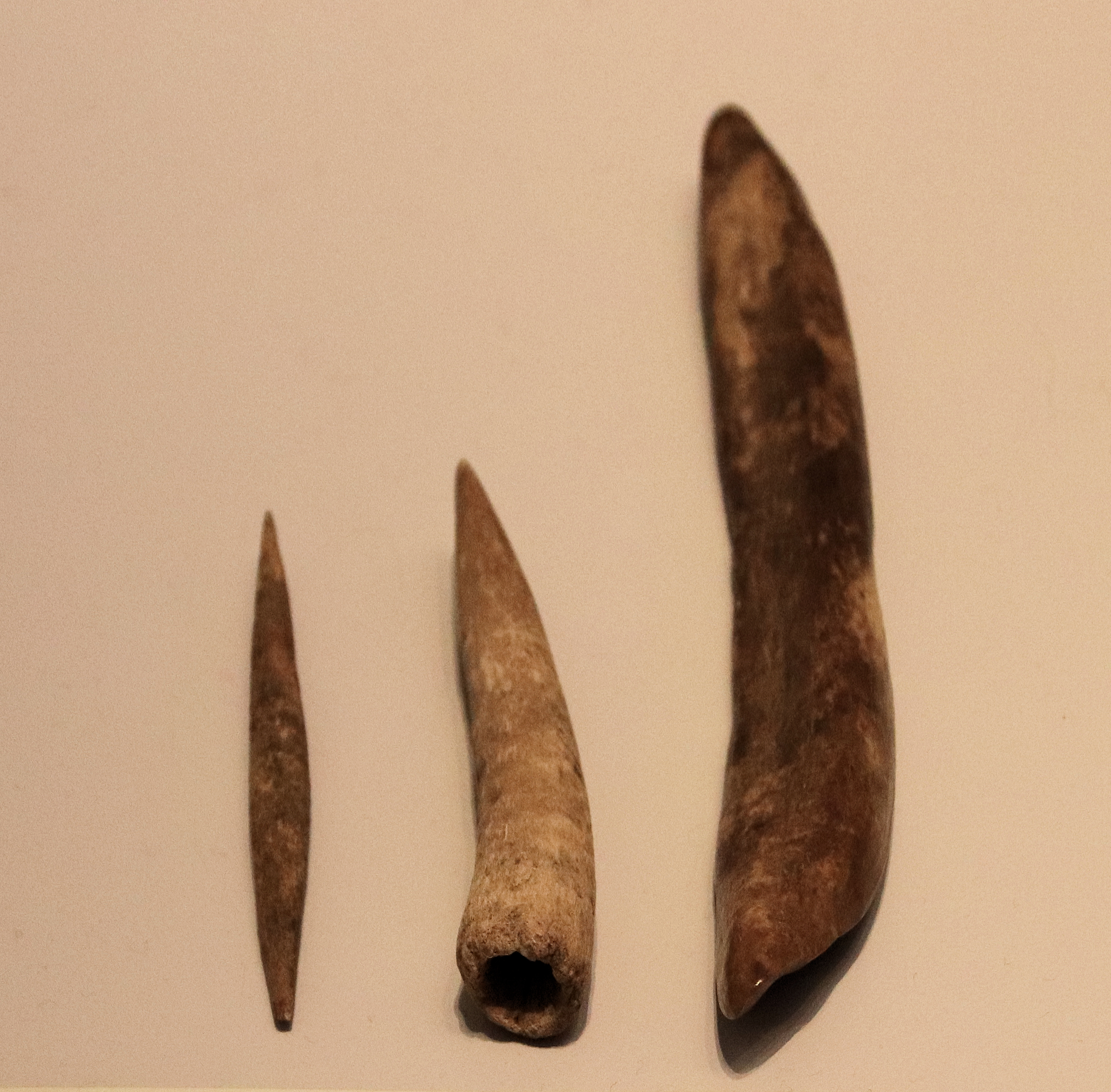
Aurignacian Culture bone tools (needle, points and tools for punching holes), Hayonim Cave, 30,000 BP.

== See also ==
- Prehistory of the Levant

== Bibliography ==
- Simmons, Alan H., The Neolithic Revolution in the Near East: Transforming the Human Landscape, 2007, University of Arizona Press, ISBN 978-0816529667, google books
- M. H. Alimen and M. J. Steve, Historia Universal siglo XXI. Prehistoria. Siglo XXI Editores, 1970 (reviewed and corrected in 1994) (original German edition, 1966, titled Vorgeschichte). ISBN 84-323-0034-9
