= HaYonim Cave =

Cave in Israel

- מערת היונים (Hebrew)
- Location within Northwest Israel
- 32°55′12.32″N 35°13′5.75″E
- Periods: Lower Paleolithic, Middle Paleolithic, Upper Paleolithic, Epi-Paleolithic
- Cultures: Acheulo-Yabrudian, Mousterian, Levantine Aurignacian, Geometric Kebaran, Natufian
- Location: Misgav Regional Council, Israel
- Region: Galilee

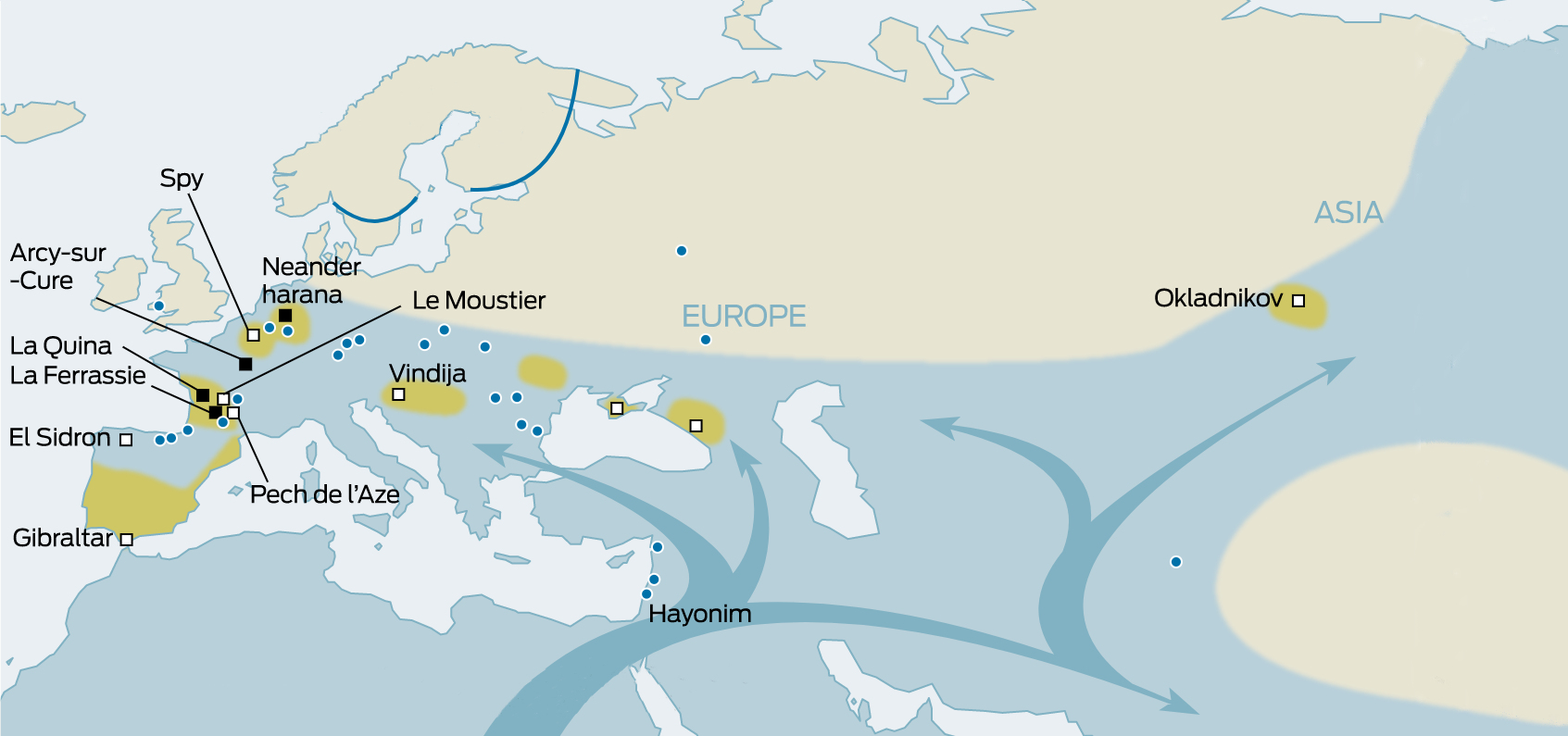
Expansion of early modern humans from Africa, through Hayonim.

HaYonim Cave (Hebrew: מערת היונים, romanized: Me'arat HaYonim, lit. 'Cave of the Pigeons') is a cave located in a limestone bluff about 250 meters above modern sea level, in the Upper Galilee, Israel.

== History ==
The site had substantial occupation during the Middle Paleolithic Mousterian period, from 250,000 years ago to 100,000 years ago, and later, during the Epipalaeolithic period and the Natufian culture around 12,000 years ago.

The Mousterian occupation of the cave included Levallois debitage and early Middle Paleolithic blade technology, as well as a series of hearths.

In Hayonim were also found wall carvings depicting symbolic shapes and animals, such a running horse dated to between 40,000-18,500 BP, possibly to the Levantine Aurignacian circa 28,000 BP, and now visible in the Israel Museum. This is considered as the first art object found within the context of the Levantine Upper Paleolithic.

The Natufian occupation of the cave featured circular rooms with prepared floors, with a thick midden of lithics, groundstone objects, and worked bone. There were several hearths, and single graves located in abandoned rooms or outside inhabited rooms.

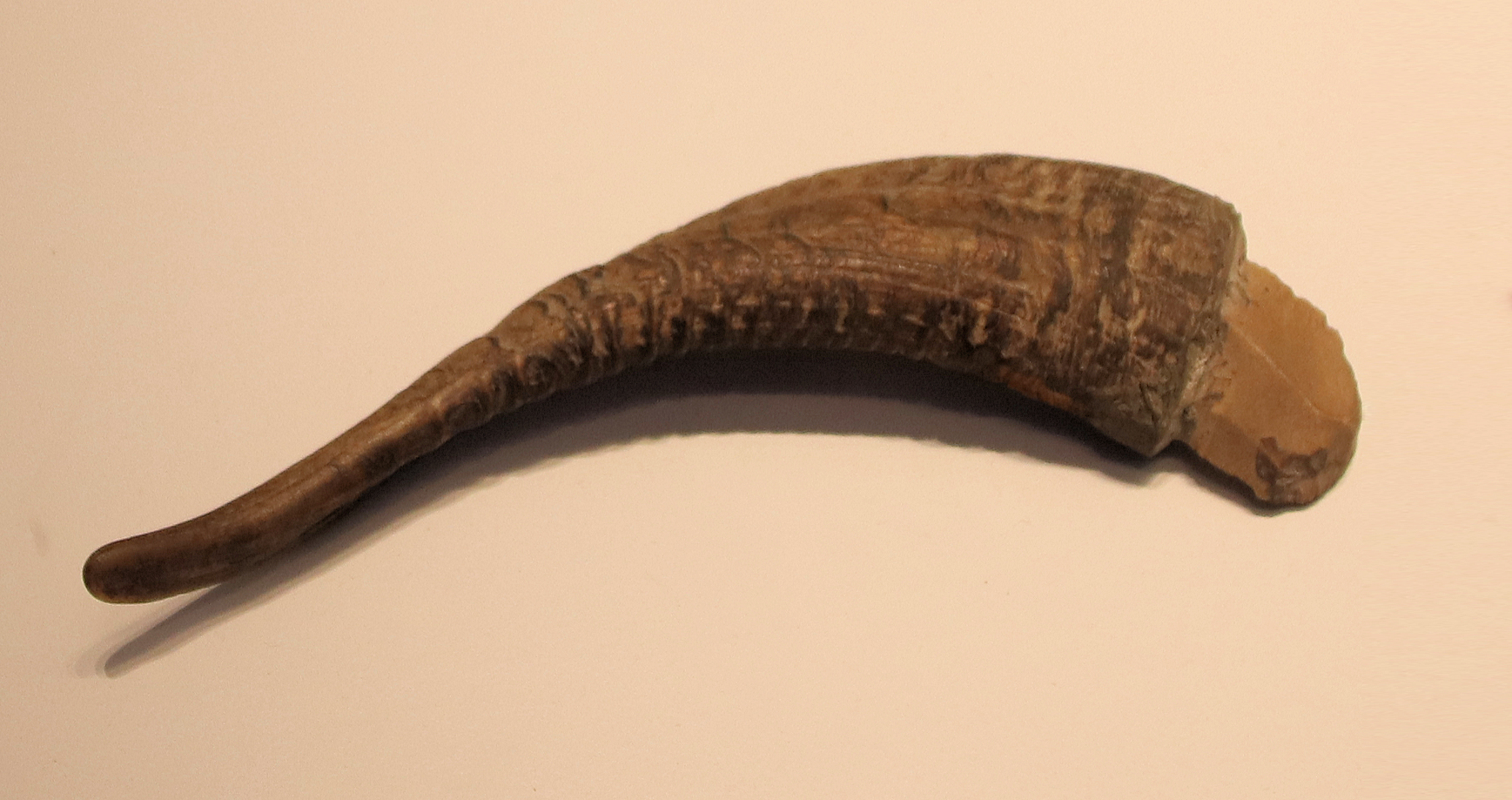
Flint end scraper with horn handle for working wood or leather, Late Stone Age, Hayonim Cave, 50000-22000 BP

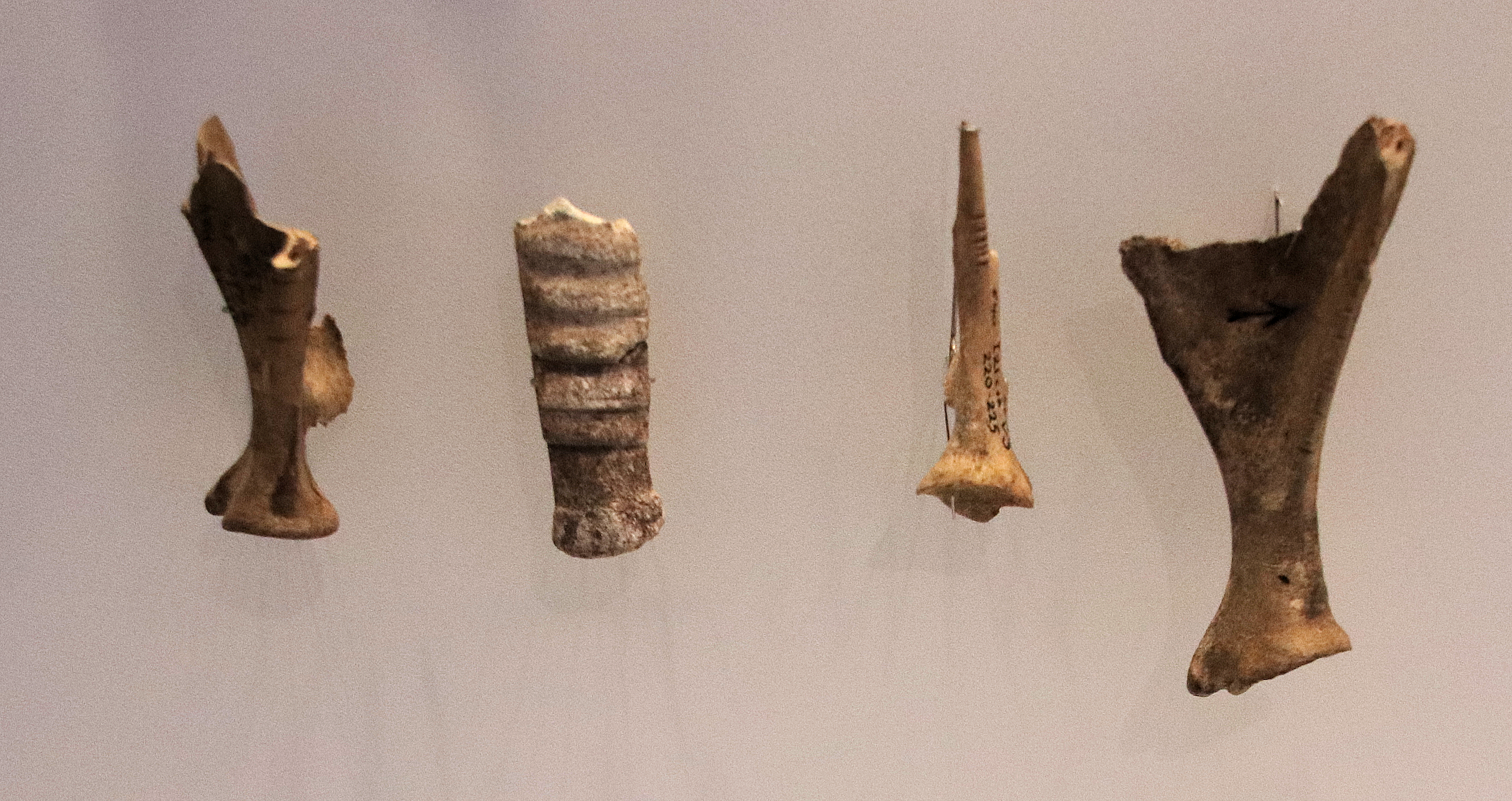
Aurignacian Culture incised animal bones, Hayonim Cave, 28000 BP.

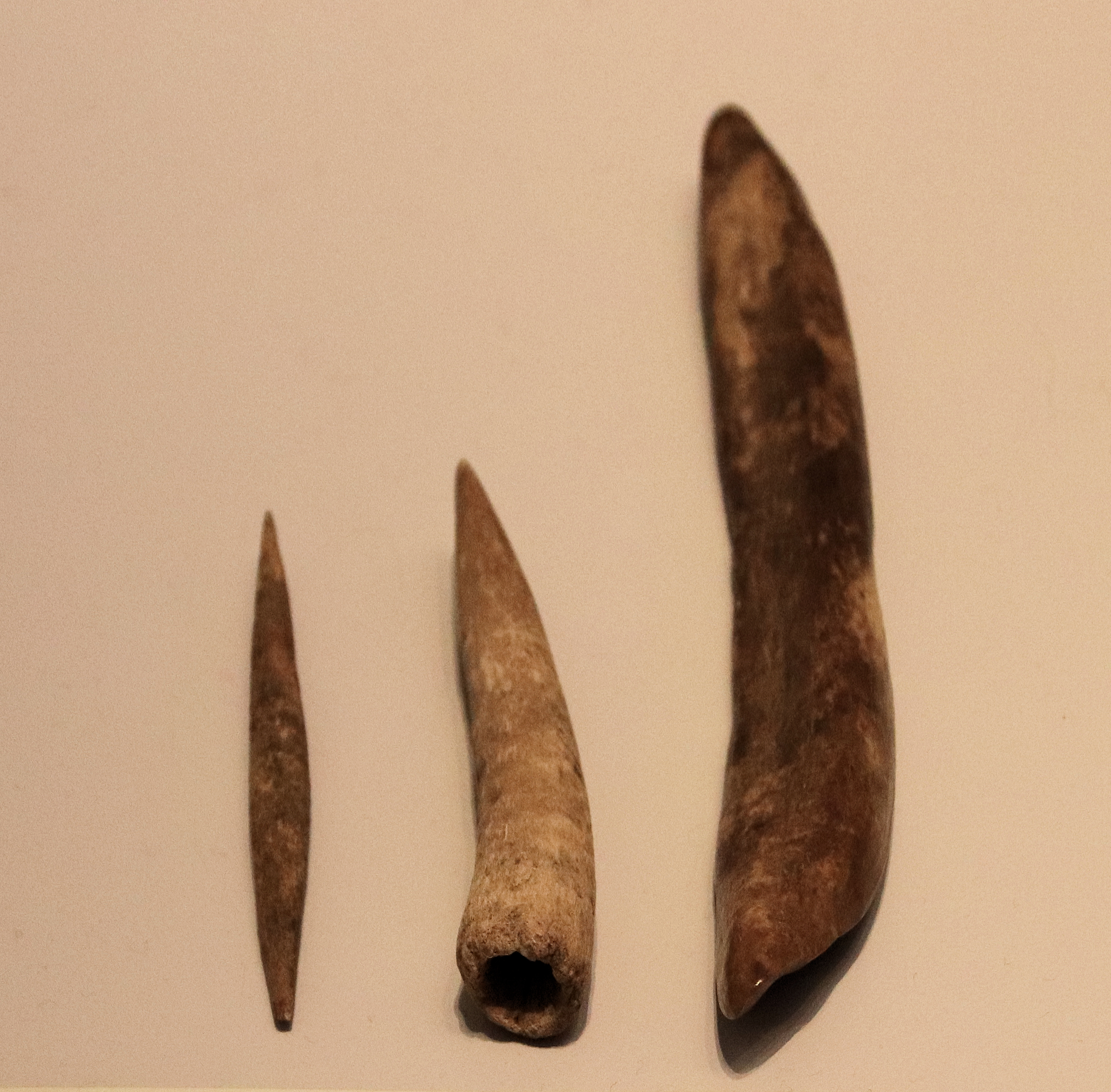
Aurignacian Culture bone tools (needle, points and tools for punching holes), Hayonim Cave, 30000 BP.

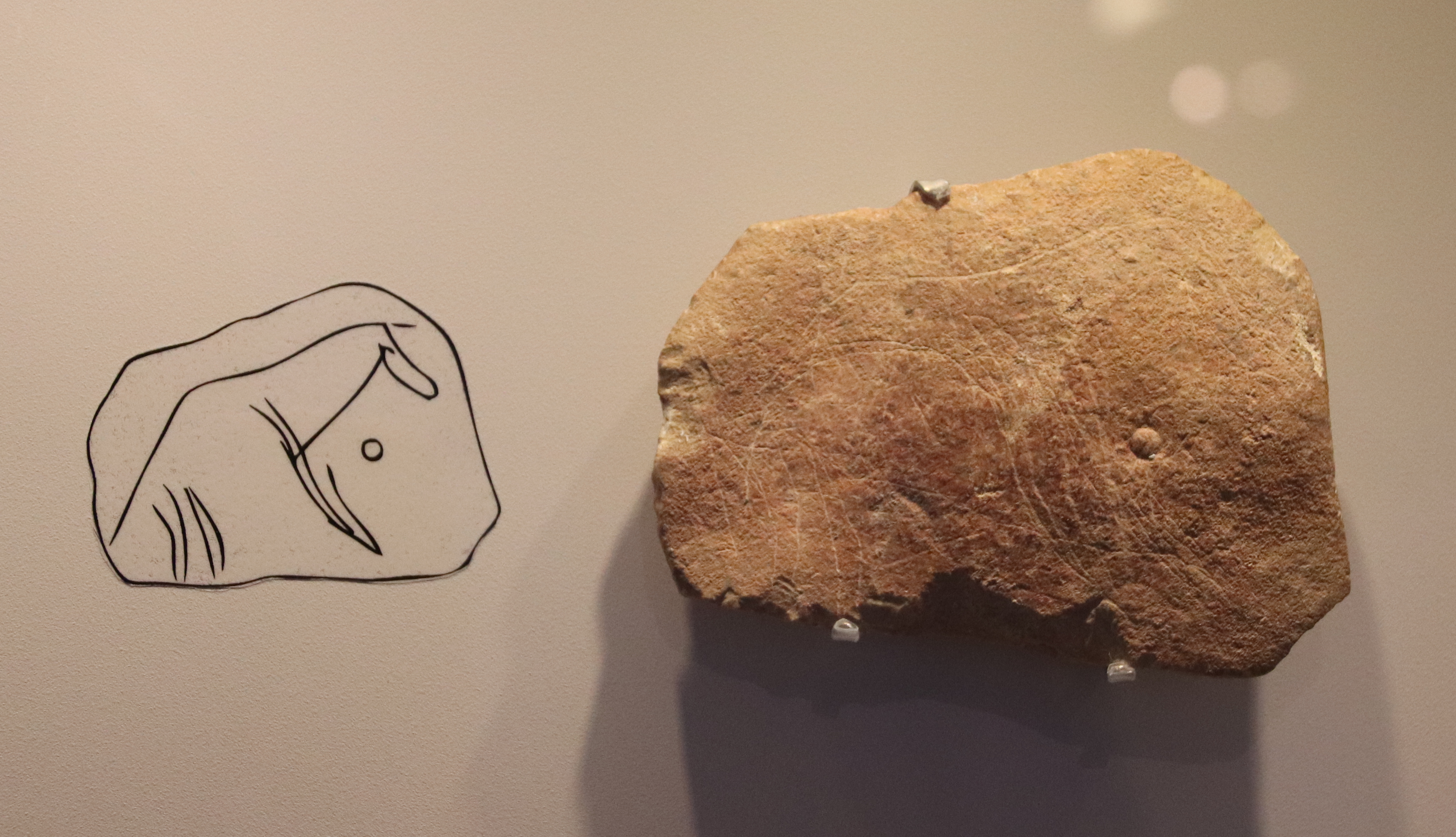
Carving of a horse, Hayonim Cave, 40,000-18,500 BP. Israel Museum.

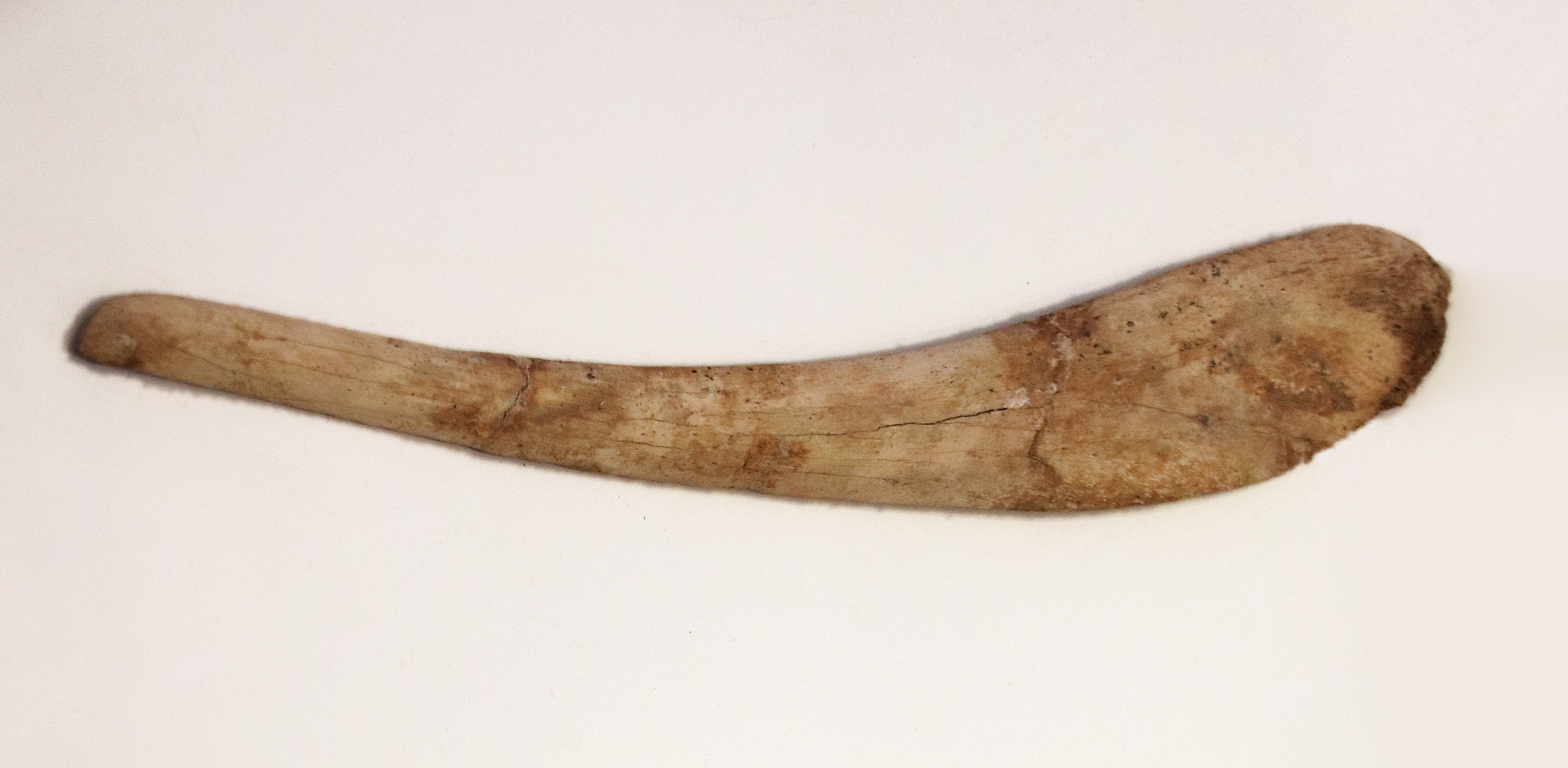
Bovine-rib dagger, Hayonim Cave, Natufian Culture, 12500-9500 BC.

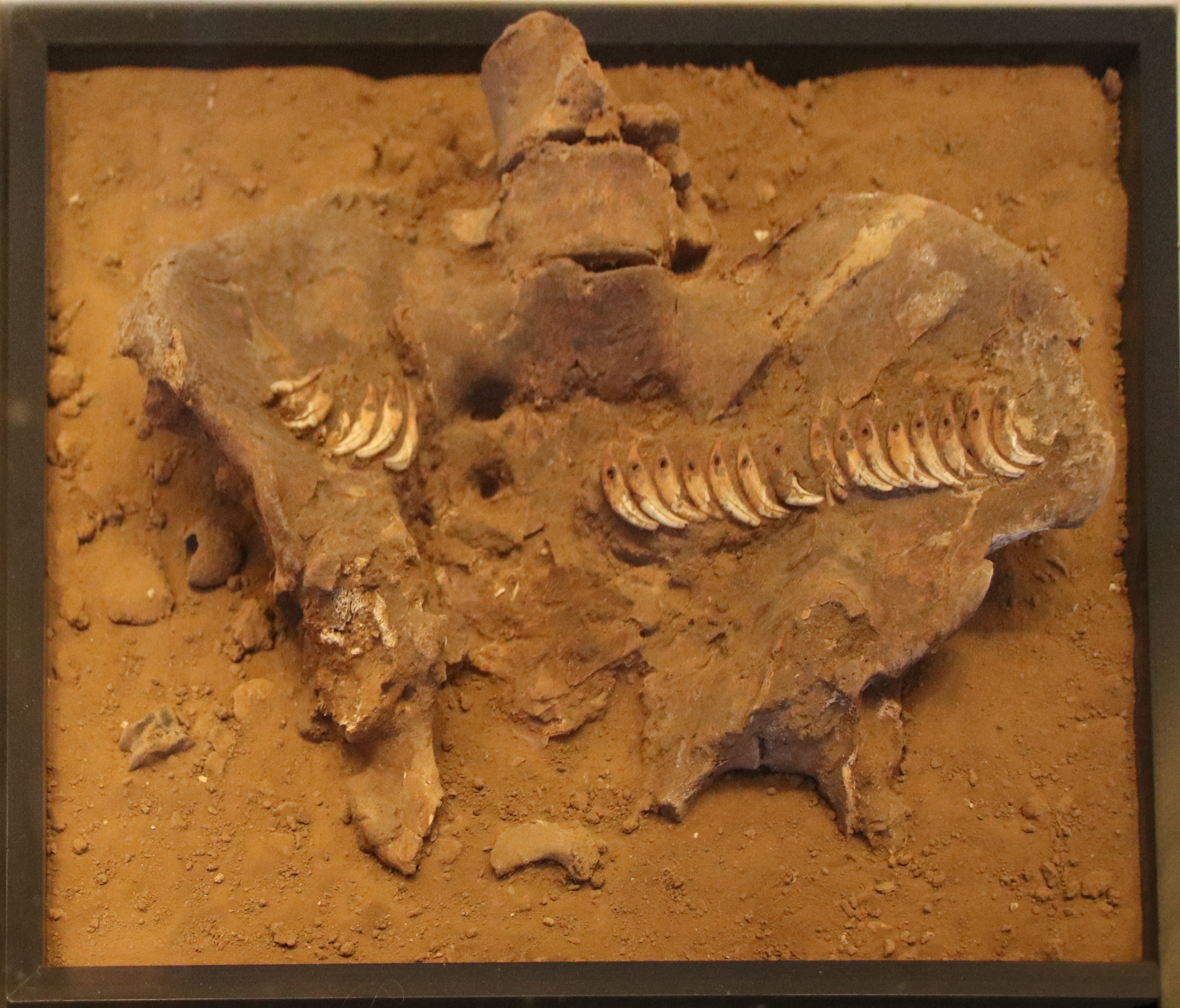
Woman's pelvis decorated with fox teeth, Hayonim Cave, Natufian Culture, 12500-9500 BC.

== See also ==
- List of caves in Israel
- Archaeology of Israel
