= Emiran =

Culture that existed in the Levant and Arabia between the last two Paleolithic periods

Emiran culture
- Emiran and contemporary cultures c. 50,000-40,000 BP
- Geographical range: Levant, Arabia
- Period: Upper Paleolithic
- Dates: about 60,000–40,000 cal B.P.
- Major sites: El Wad
- Preceded by: Mousterian, Aterian
- Followed by: Bohunician, Ahmarian, Levantine Aurignacian

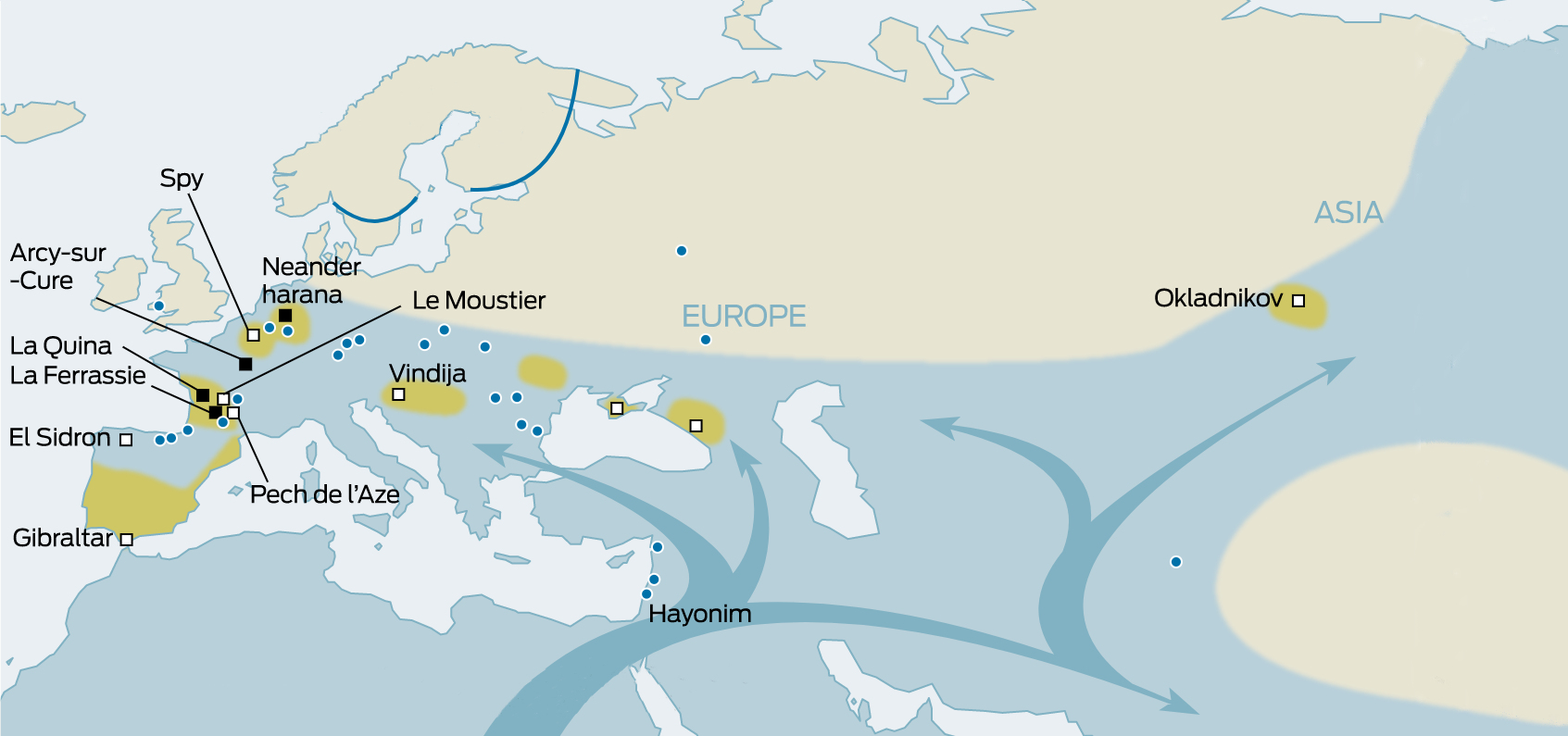
Expansion of early modern humans from Africa through the Levant.

Emiran culture was a culture that existed in the Levant (Lebanon, Palestine, Syria, Israel, Jordan, Egypt and Arabia) between the Middle Paleolithic and the Upper Paleolithic periods. It is the oldest known of the Upper Paleolithic cultures and remains an enigma as it transitionally has no clear African progenitor. This has led some scholars to conclude that the Emiran is indigenous to the Levant. However, some argue that it reflects broader technological trends observed earlier in North Africa, at older sites like Taramsa 1 in Egypt, "which contains modern human remains dated to 75,000 years ago".

== Emiran period ==
Emiran culture may have developed from the local Mousterian without rupture, keeping numerous elements of the Levalloise-Mousterian, together with the locally typical Emireh point. The Emireh point is the type tool of stage one of the Upper Paleolithic, first identified in the Emiran culture. Numerous stone blade tools were used, including curved knives similar to those found in the Châtelperronian culture of Western Europe.

The Emiran eventually evolved into the Ahmarian, and later the Levantine Aurignacian culture (formerly called Antelian), still of Levalloise tradition but with some Aurignacian influences.

According to Dorothy Garrod, the Emireh point, known from several sites in Palestine, is the hallmark of this culture.

== Relationships ==
"Levantine Aurignacian", from the Levant, is a type of blade technology very similar to the European Aurignacian, following chronologically the Emiran and Early Ahmarian in the same area of the Near East, and closely related to them.

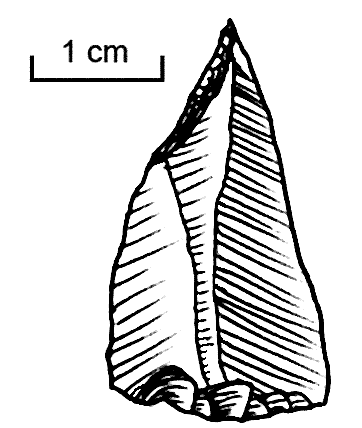
Emireh point microlith

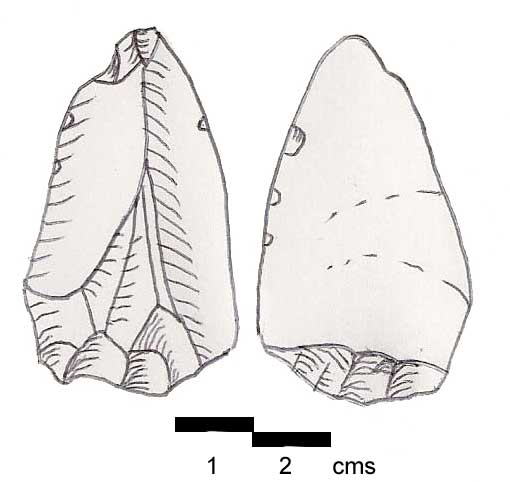
Emireh point.

== See also ==
- Archaeology of Israel
- Zuttiyeh Cave
