= Jamal Cave =

Archaeological site in northern Israel

- Gamal Cave
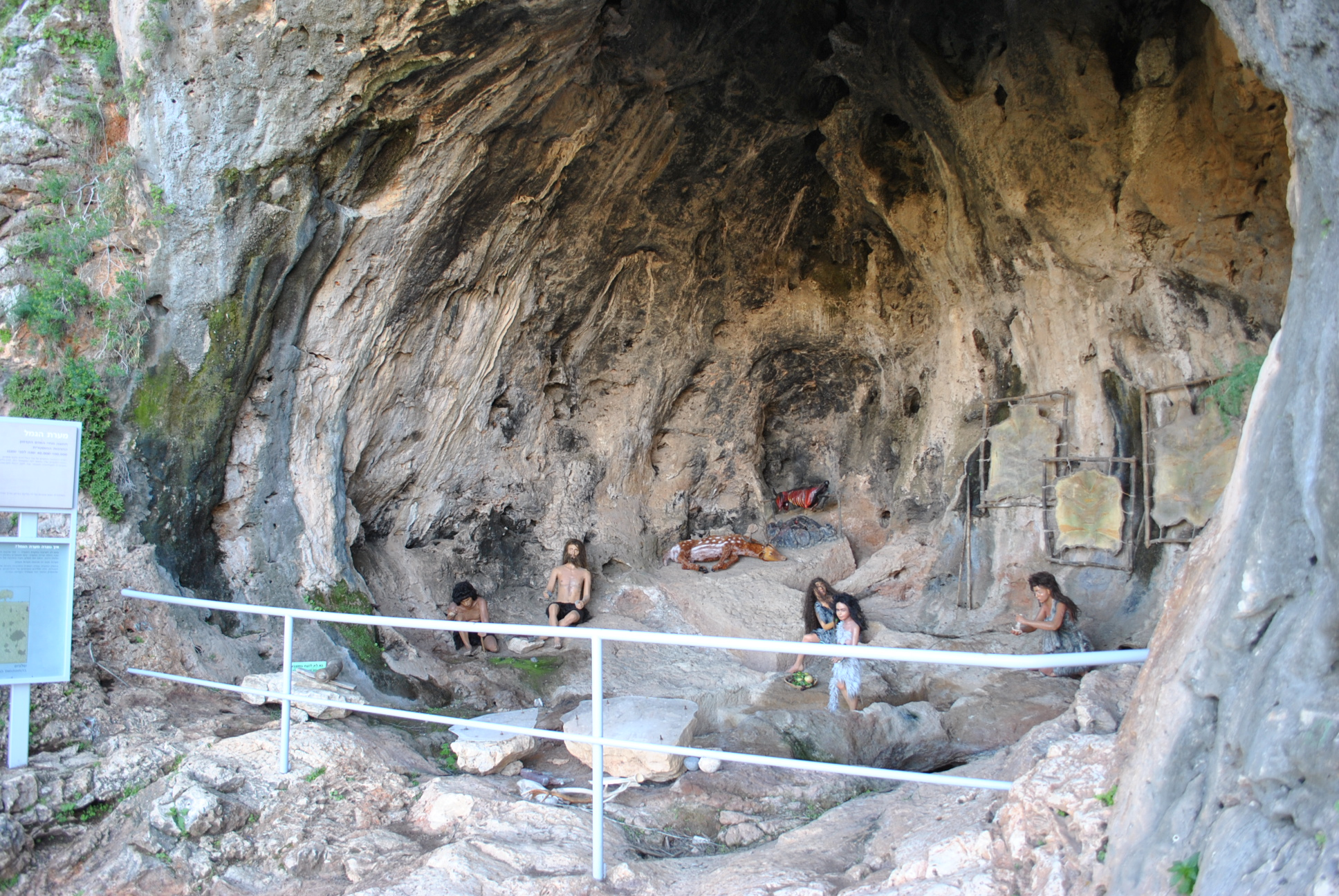

- Location within Haifa region of Israel
- 32°40′14″N 34°57′58″E
- Type: Karst cave
- Periods: Paleolithic
- Cultures: Acheulo-Yabrudian complex
- Location: Hof HaCarmel Regional Council, Haifa District, Israel
- Region: Mount Carmel, Levant
- Part of: Nahal Me'arot Nature Reserve

Site notes
- Elevation: 45 m (148 ft)
- Height: 12 m (39 ft)
- Width: 9 m (30 ft)
- Excavation dates: Dorothy Garrod (1930s), Mina Evron (1992-1994)

UNESCO World Heritage Site
- Designated: 2012
- Reference no.: 1393

Jamal Cave (Arabic: مغارة الجمل, lit. 'Camel Cave') or Gamal Cave (Hebrew: מערת גמל) is an archaeological and prehistoric site in the western Carmel region, part of the Nahal Mearot prehistoric site, along with three other caves in its vicinity: Tabun Cave, Skhul Cave, and el-Wad Cave. The caves were proclaimed as having universal value by UNESCO in 2012.

== Description ==
It is a small karst cave with dimensions of about 9 by 12 meters and is located between Tabun Cave and Nahal Cave at an elevation of 45 meters above sea level, facing northwest.

== History ==
Jamal Cave was first excavated by the English archaeologist Dorothy Garrod as part of the large excavation project in Nahal Mearot during the 1930s. The conclusion was that the site did not contain noteworthy Paleolithic layers. The first systematic excavation at Camel Cave was carried out by Mina Evron on behalf of the Zinman Institute of Archaeology at the University of Haifa. Evron excavated the cave from 1992 to 1994 and revealed a layer of burnt earth (ash) containing Paleolithic stone tools. Human and animal bones were not preserved in the cave.

The karst depressions overlooking the archaeological layer were dated using the uranium-thorium method to approximately 220,000 years ago, making the prehistoric findings from this period or even older. Similar findings from Layer E in Tabun Cave nearby were dated to between 400,000 and 250,000 years ago. Most of the tools were made from local materials collected from within a radius of about six kilometers around the site.

On June 29, 2012, Jamal Cave, along with Nahal Mearot, was declared a UNESCO World Heritage Site.

== See also ==
- Prehistory of the Levant
