= Skhul and Qafzeh hominins =

Hominin fossils

Coordinates: 32°41′18″N 35°19′06″E

- Common name: Skhul and Qafzeh hominins
- Species: Homo sapiens
- Age: c. 100,000 years
- Place discovered: Skhul and Qafzeh caves
- Date discovered: 1930s
- Discovered by: Dorothy Garrod

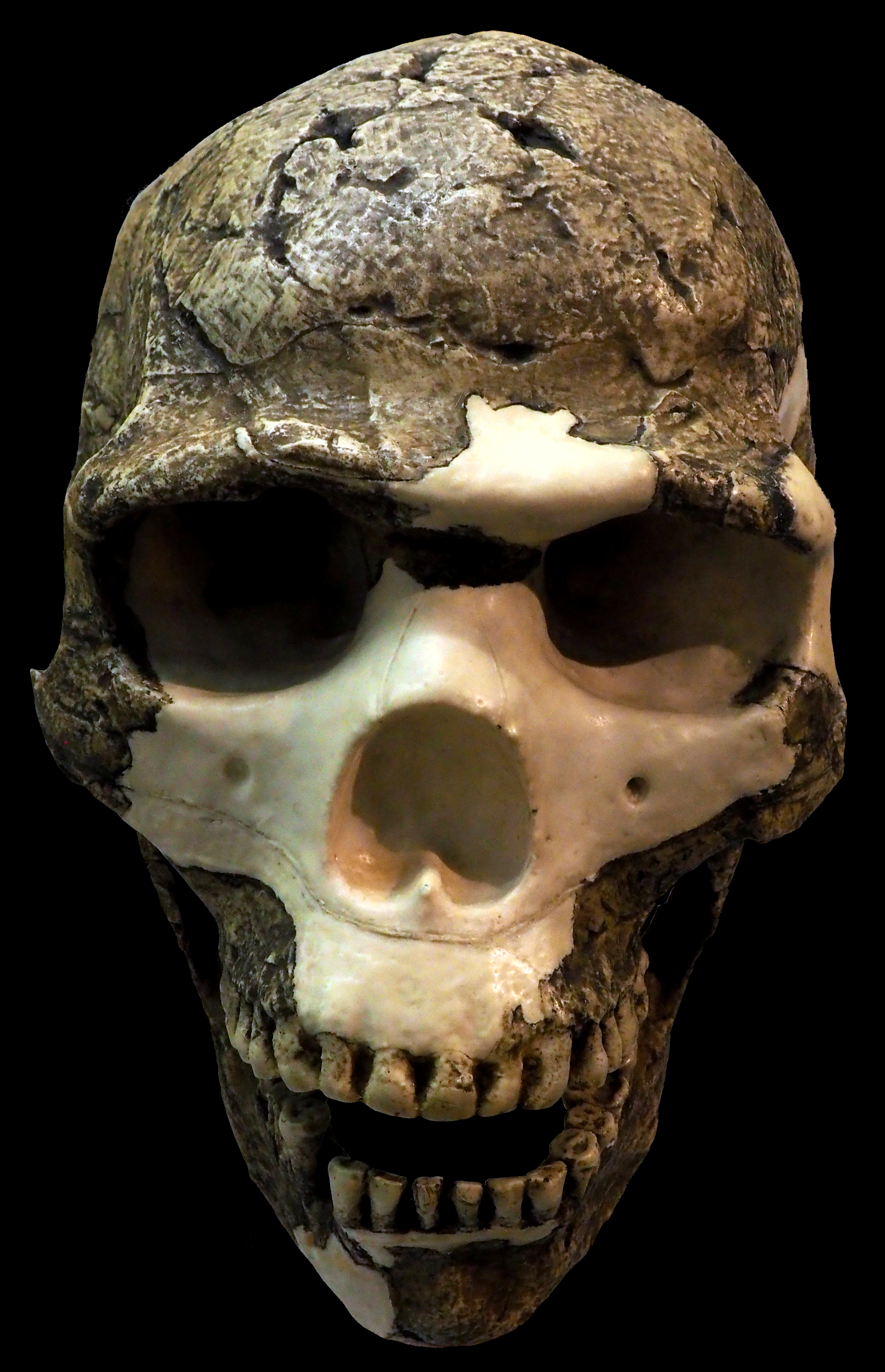
Skhul 5 replica

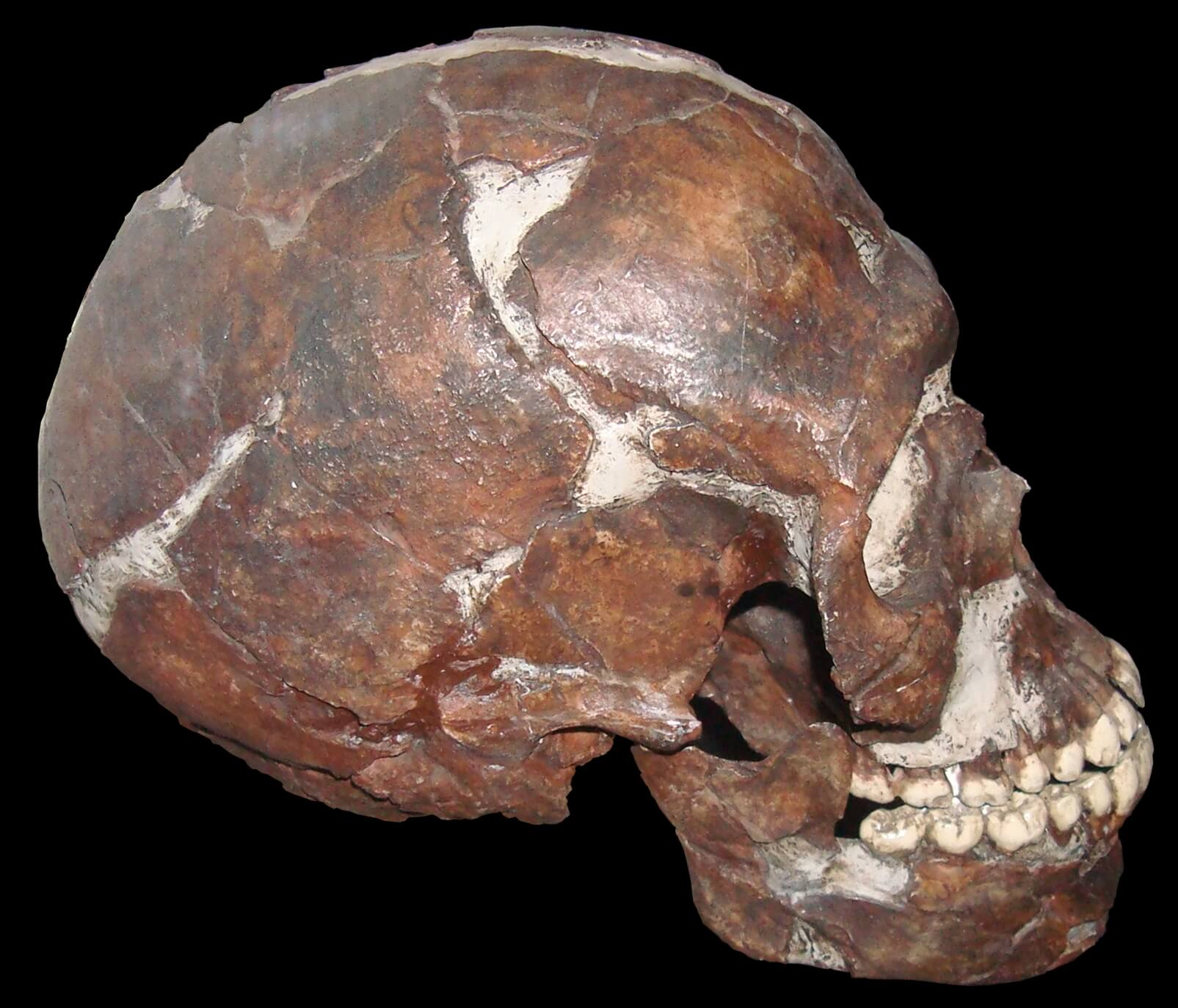
Qafzeh 9 replica

The Skhul and Qafzeh hominins or Qafzeh–Skhul early modern humans are hominin fossils discovered in Es-Skhul and Qafzeh caves in Israel. They are today classified as Homo sapiens, among the earliest of their species in Eurasia. Skhul Cave is on the slopes of Mount Carmel; Qafzeh Cave is a rockshelter near Nazareth in Lower Galilee.

The remains found at Es Skhul, together with those found at the Nahal Me'arot Nature Reserve and Mugharet el-Zuttiyeh, were classified in 1939 by Arthur Keith and Theodore D. McCown as Palaeoanthropus palestinensis, a descendant of Homo heidelbergensis.

== Research history ==
=== Discovery ===
In 1928, Mandatory Palestine planned to mine the cliffs of Nahal Me'arot (a valley in the Carmel mountain range) for construction of a deep-water harbour in the city of Haifa roughly 19 km (12 mi) north. The Department of Antiquities, already suspecting the archaeological value of the many openly visible caves in the area, sent the assistant director — C. Lambert — on a three-week trial excavation of El Wad in November. Lambert discovered several stone tools, quern-stones, beads, stone constructions, and human fossils, as well as the first published discovery of Near Eastern Stone Age art (an animal-shaped bone sickle). The British School of Archaeology at Jerusalem partnered with the American School of Prehistoric Research (ASPR) to fund seven field seasons from 1929 to 1934 of the region's caves under the direction of British archaeologist Dorothy Garrod.

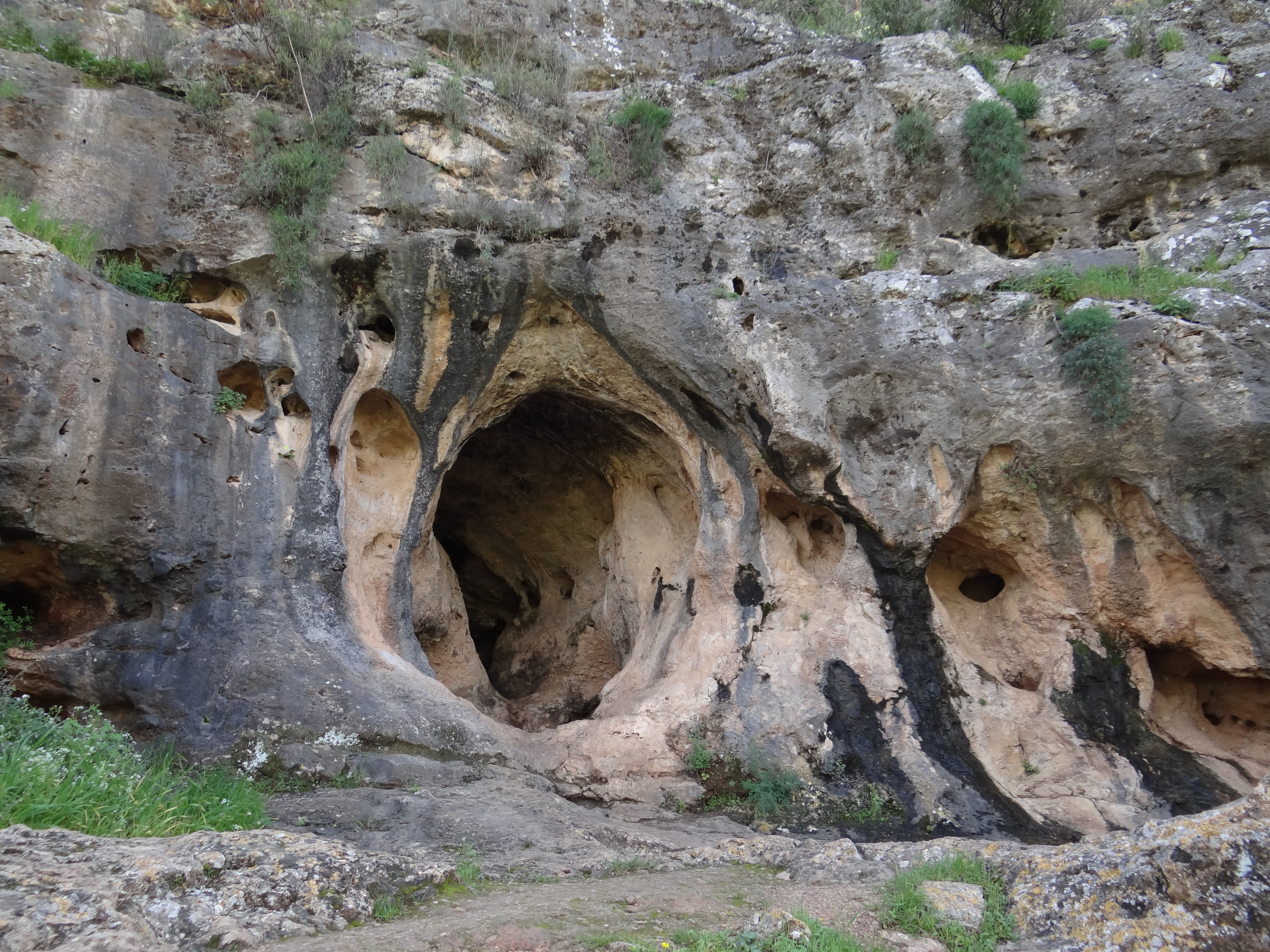
Skhul Cave at Mount Carmel, Israel

She invited American archaeologist Theodore D. McCown to excavate Skhul Cave, who joined as a field representative of the ASPR as part of his graduate program with University of California, Berkeley. On 3 May 1931, McCown unearthed a fossil child skeleton (Skhul I); and on 30 April 1932 (with his assistant Hallam L. Movius), he discovered another skeleton (Skhul II), a partial skull and jaw (Skhul III), and a nearly complete skeleton (Skhul IV). On 3 May 1932, McCown and Movius discovered another nearly complete skeleton (Skhul V), and a partial skeleton (Skhul VI). McCown found another partial skull (Skhul VII) and child skeleton (Skhul VIII) on 13 May, a partial skeleton (Skhul IX) on 19 May, and an infant skeleton (Skhul X) while studying the material in 1935.

The full excavation history of the site, archaeological finds, palaeoenvironmental studies, and anatomical description of the fossil material was published in a two-volume monograph in 1937; volume 1 published by Garrod and Welsh palaeontologist Dorothea Bate, and volume 2 by McCown and British anatomist Sir Arthur Keith. The skeletons were removed from stone matrices principally under the direction of McCown at the Royal College of Surgeons of England over the course of three years, aided by his assistants Margot Collett and W. C. Willmott. Keith and McCown were able to study the material at the Buckston Browne Research Farm, and afterwards they repatriated the material back to Mandatory Palestine. The material from Skhul Cave, as well as the nearby Tabun Cave, represented one of the most complete samples of the human fossil record at the time.

In 1951, American anthropologist Francis Clark Howell recognised the similarities between the Skhul remains and human fossils exhumed about 35 km (22 mi) east from Qafzeh Cave by French consulate René Neuville beginning in 1934. The connection was initially unpopular because the Qafzeh material was unpublished and the stratigraphy and age were uncertain. In 1963, the Israeli ambassador to France, Walter Eytan, suggested to French palaeontologist Jean Piveteau to continue excavation of Qafzeh, which recommenced under Piveteau and his student Jean Perrot in July 1965. Their work cemented the connection between Skhul and Qafzeh.

=== Age and stratigraphy ===
In 1937, Garrod and Bate divided the 2.5 m (8 ft 2 in) thick reddish-brown breccia of Skhul Cave into three layers: the 60 cm (2 ft) Layer A yielding pottery fragments and Middle to Upper Palaeolithic artefacts; the 2 m (6 ft 7 in) Layer B yielding at least 10 fossil individuals and around 9,800 stone tools; and the 30 cm (1 ft) Layer C yielding some stone tools of the same culture as Layer B. They concluded that Skhul Layers B and C are roughly contemporaneous with the Neanderthal fossils of Tabun Cave Layers B and C, and date to the Riss-Würm interglacial (the Middle Pleistocene) based on the animal remains (biostratigraphy). Layer B of Tabun lacks wild cattle and instead has a preponderance of gazelle, unlike the older Tabun C as well as Skhul B, so Garrod and Bate suggested that Tabun B was deposited in a younger, dryer period than Skhul B (presuming wild cattle require wetter conditions). That is, the Skhul B material which better resembles modern humans was older than the Tabun B material which better resembles Neanderthals.

In 1957, Howell asserted that the Skhul and Tabun material must date to the Early Last Pluvial (the early Last Glacial Period during the Late Pleistocene). In 1961, British archaeologist Eric Sidney Higgs rejected Garrod and Bates' arguments for Skhul B dating to a wetter period older than Tabun B, suggesting Skhul B might actually be from a dry period younger than Tabun B. In general, most workers opted to date the Neanderthals of the region (Tabun, Amud, Kebara) to about 50,000 years ago, and the modern humans of Skhul and Qafzeh to 40,000 years ago.

In 1988, French palaeontologist Hélène Valladas and colleagues dated stone tools from Qafzeh using thermoluminescence dating to about 90,000–100,000 years ago (at the time, nearly as old as some of the oldest modern human fossils from Africa). In 1989, British physical anthropologist Chris Stringer and colleagues used electron spin resonance dating of bovine teeth at Skhul to date the human fossils to roughly 80,000–100,000 years ago. This meant that modern humans quickly dispersed from Africa soon after evolution, but did not penetrate Europe for tens thousands of years. Further, Skhul and Qafzeh were older than Tabun and other Neanderthal sites, implying that modern humans were replaced by Neanderthals.

=== Classification ===
==== Early racial classifications ====
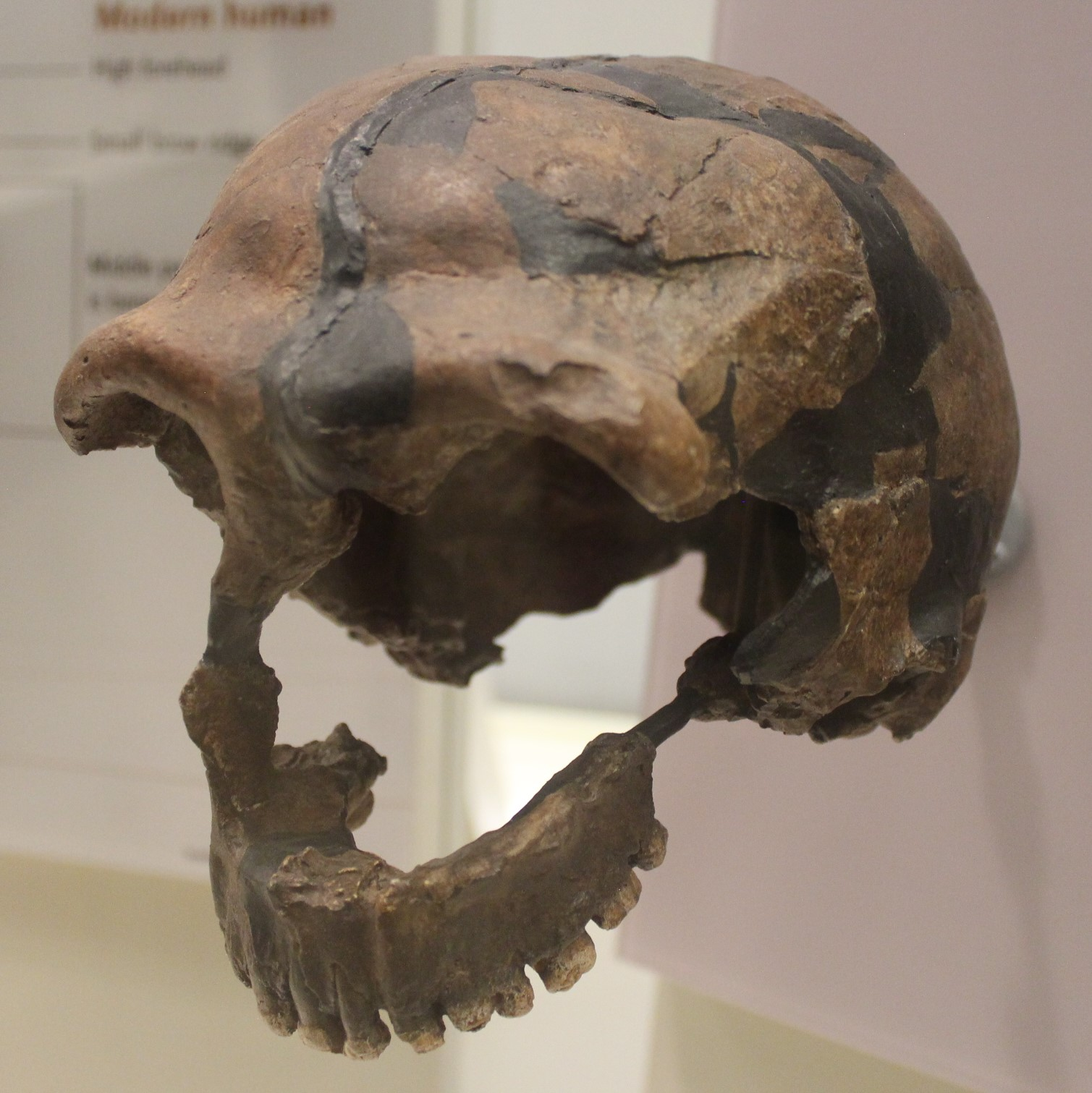
Tabun 1 was grouped into the same population as the Skhul material.

McCown and Keith noted that the Tabun material more closely resembled Neanderthals (Homo neanderthalensis), while the Skhul material better resembled later Cro-Magnons (modern humans, H. sapiens). Nonetheless, they opted to recognise the Tabun and Skhul populations as belonging to the same highly variable species based on cultural and dental similarity, and because they were thought to be contemporaries at the time. They also grouped Keith's 1925 Galilee Man discovered 56 km (35 mi) away into this group, on the Tabun end of variation. They believed the population was closely related to the last common ancestor of Neanderthals and Cro-Magnons, "in the throes of an evolutionary transition," envisioning a geographic grade ranging from the "evolutionary backwater" of Western Europe with the "Palaeoanthropic" (less evolved) classic Neanderthals, to the "Neanthropic" (more evolved) Near East. In their model, human populations became progressively more evolutionarily advanced from Western Europe towards the Near East, with the homeland of what they considered the most-evolved Caucasian race lying still farther east in Asia. They concluded that migration by Caucasian populations from the Near East had advanced the population of Europe during the Palaeolithic, drawing a comparison with the later migration of Near Eastern farmers into Neolithic Europe.

In brief, our theory assumes that Europe became the 'Australia' of the ancient world after mid-Pleistocene times and that the people who colonized it and extinguished its Neanderthal inhabitants, as the whites are now ousting the 'blacks' of Australia, were Caucasians evolved in western Asia.

— Theodore D. McCown and Sir Arthur Keith, 1937

McCown and Keith opted to classify the Tabun and Skhul remains as a new species, "Palaeoanthropus palestinensis". The genus "Palaeoanthropus" was erected in 1909 by Italian palaeontologist Guido Bonarelli to house the substantially older German Mauer 1 (originally Homo heidelbergensis). They retained "P. heidelbergensis" as the earliest member of this evolutionary lineage. The other species they designated (from west to east) are: "P. neanderthalensis" (specifically the French La Chappelle-aux-Saints 1 and Western German Neanderthal 1), the Central German "P. ehringsdorfiensis", and the Croatian "P. krapinensis", with "P. krapinensis" as the closest relative of "P. palestinensis", serving to, "bridge the gap between the ancient Palestinians and the Neanderthalians of western Europe." They noted that the Middle Pleistocene German Steinheim skull, which they considered to be the earliest known Neanderthal type in Europe, has more in common with the Tabun and Skhul material than with European Neanderthals.

==== Modern evolutionary synthesis ====
In the 1940s, the formulation of modern evolutionary synthesis and the burgeoning field of population genetics shifted the popular interpretations of fossil populations and the definition of "species" in palaeontology. Notably, Jewish-German anatomist Franz Weidenreich and Russian-American geneticist Theodosius Dobzhansky argued that only one widespread species of human should be recognised as existing at any one point in time, which can be subdivided into geographic subspecies or races.

In 1944, Dobzhansky stated that it was more probable that the Tabun and Skhul material are the result of interbreeding between archaic and modern humans, which should naturally occur (in this case quite frequently) when "Neanderthaliens" (Tabun) and H. sapiens (Skhul) are in proximity. He further said that the lack of reproductive isolation between Neanderthals and modern humans demonstrated by Tabun and Skhul is proof that they are different races of the same species, exclaiming, "This shows how rash are the assertions of some writers that in fossil forms evidence on presence or absence of reproductive isolation can never be obtained!"

On the basis of the available data there is no reason to suppose that more than a single hominid species has existed on any time level in the Pleistocene. Particularly, the findings of McCown and Keith on Mount Carmel prove that the Neanderthal and modern types were races of the same species rather than distinct species.

— Theodosius Dobzhansky, 1944

Similarly, in 1950, German-American evolutionary biologist Ernst Mayr, surveying a "bewildering diversity of names", subsumed human fossils into three species of Homo: "H. transvaalensis" (the australopithecines), H. erectus, and H. sapiens — with each species directly evolving into the next with no overlap (chronospecies). He justified sinking Neanderthals into a subspecies of H. sapiens as H. s. neanderthalensis using the Skhul and Tabun material, commenting, "The fact remains that Mt. Carmel man makes the delimitation of modern man from Neanderthal exceedingly difficult, if not impossible."

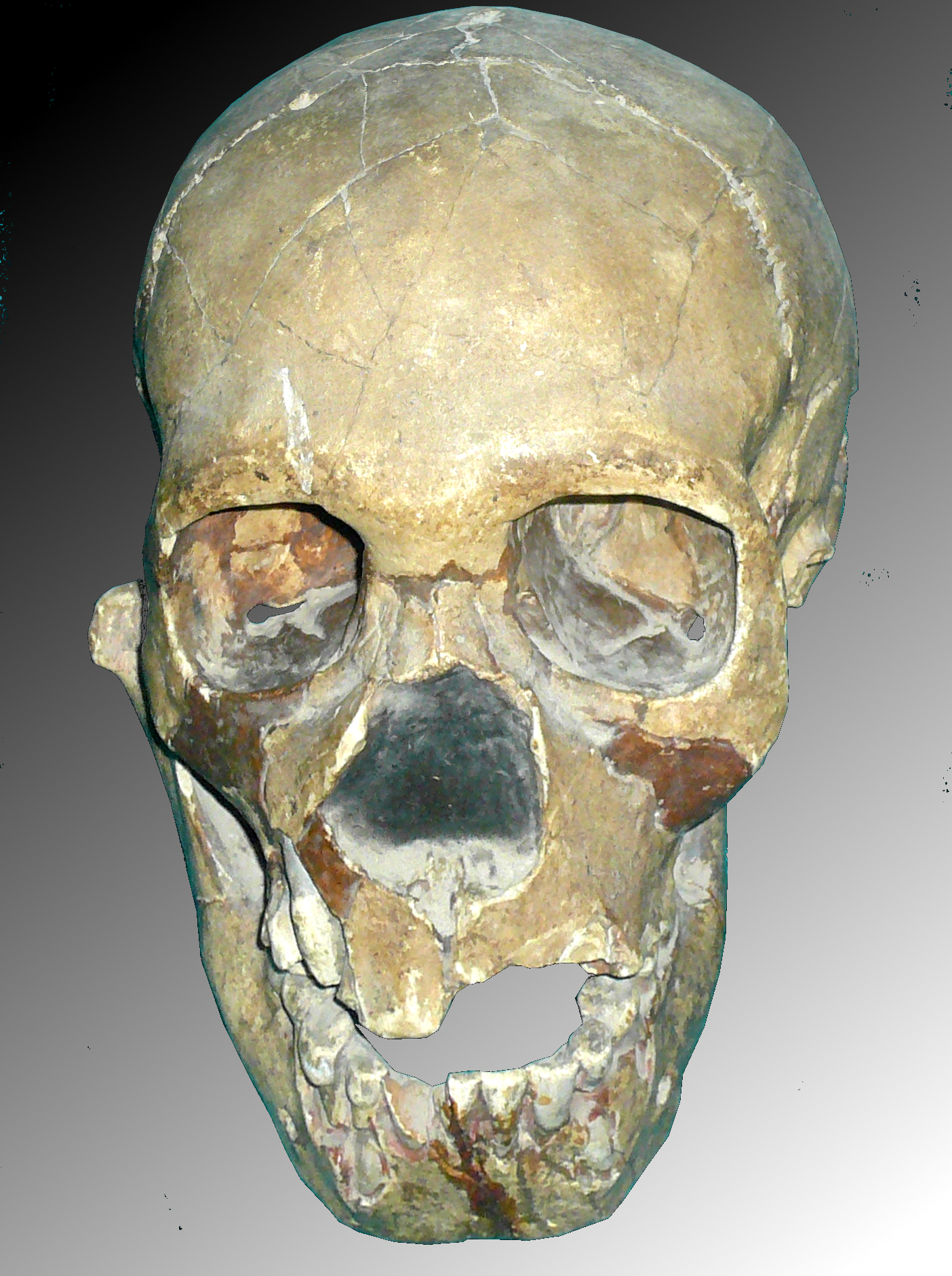
Howell grouped Teshik-Tash 1 with the Skhul and Qafzeh hominins.

Subsequently, many authors favoured recognising a Neanderthal phase in human evolution, which would terminate with anatomically modern humans and classic Neanderthals. In 1951, Howell distinguished classic Neanderthals of the Würm glaciation from "early Neanderthals" of the Riss-Würm interglacial, which he placed as the ancestral stock of both classic Neanderthals and modern humans. He included Skhul and Tabun as a Southwest Asian variety of early Neanderthal — a population ancestral to modern humans, as opposed to a hybrid population. He also considered the reach of that specific population represented at Mount Carmel to Galilee Man, the Uzbekistani Teshik-Tash 1, and the (at the time undescribed) material of Qafzeh Cave.

In 1957, Howell redated all of these sites to the Early Last Pluvial, making them contemporaneous with classic Neanderthals. He further argued that there is no evidence that Skhul is contemporaneous with Tabun. He envisioned a lineage descending from the population represented by the Tunisian Tighennif jaw (from the Great Interglacial) going through a "sapiensization" event during the Last Interglacial, which led to Skhul and Qafzeh, and eventually Cro-Magnons. Concurrently, the population represented by the German Swanscombe and Steinheim skulls (also from the Great Interglacial) led to early Neanderthals in the Last Interglacials, which persisted in the Near East (Tabun) as well as Eastern and Central Europe, but underwent "Neanderthalization" in Southern and Western Europe. Howell's association of Qafzeh with Skhul was largely unpopular until Qafzeh was better excavated and studied by Piveteau and Perrot from 1965 to 1979. In general, H. sapiens was commonly divided into "archaic" and "anatomically modern" groups, with the former encompassing European and African Middle Pleistocene fossils and the Late Pleistocene classic Neanderthals; and the latter, groups such as the Skhul and Qafzeh hominins, and Cro-Magnons.

==== Cladistics ====
The expansion of the European and African fossil record through the 1960s, 70s, and 80s conflicted with the one-species model, with workers like British physical anthropologist Chris Stringer arguing to recognize several coexisting Homo species. Once radiometric dating established the chronology of the many fossil-bearing Levantine cave sites, many authors opted to recognize two distinct species occupying the area in the early Late Pleistocene: anatomically modern humans (H. sapiens) and Neanderthals (H. neanderthalensis). While the Skhul and Qafzeh hominins differ in many aspects from later human specimens, they are most closely allied to other anatomically modern humans of North Africa than to the local Neanderthal population.

Skhul and Qazfeh, thus, represented an early dispersal of modern humans out of Africa beginning maybe at the start of the Late Pleistocene roughly 120,000 years ago. Modern humans were later replaced by Neanderthals, until a second modern human dispersal from Africa roughly 70,000 years ago. This dispersal would then go on to colonize the rest of the world. In 2018, modern human fossils from Misliya Cave (also around Mount Carmel) were dated to 177,000 years ago, which could indicate modern human populations fluctuated in and out of the Levant several times (maybe in response to environmental stressors), possibly even before 200,000 years ago.

In 2000, a Neanderthal (C1) from Tabun was estimated to be about 122,000 years old, and in 2005, a set of seven Neanderthal teeth from Tabun were dated to around 90,000 years ago. These dates open the possibility that modern humans from Skhul and Qafzeh and Neanderthals from Tabun inhabited the Levant at the same time.

A 2021 phylogeny of some Middle and Late Pleistocene modern human fossils using tip dating:

- Homo
  - H. habilis
  - - H. erectus
    - - H. neanderthalensis
      - Homo sapiens
        - Irhoud 1, 2
        - - - Laetoli hominin 18
            - - Florisbad
              - Tabun 2
          - - Omo 2
            - - Skhul 5, 9
              - - Zhoukoudian Upper Cave 101, 103
                - - - Qafzeh 9
                    - Oase 1, 2
                  - - Mladeč 1, 2, 5, 6
                    - - Cro-Magnon 1
                      - Liujiang

== Skhul ==
The Skhul remains (Skhul 1–9) were discovered between 1929 and 1935 in the Es-Skhul Cave on Mount Carmel. The remains of seven adults and three children were found, some of which (Skhul 1, 4, and 5) are claimed to have been burials. Assemblages of perforated Nassarius shells (a marine genus), which are significantly different from local fauna, have also been recovered from the area, suggesting that these people may have collected and employed the shells as beads, as they are unlikely to have been used as food.

Skhul Layer B has been dated to an average of 81,000–101,000 years ago with the electron spin resonance method, and to an average of 119,000 years ago with the thermoluminescence method.

=== Skhul 5 ===
Skhul 5 had the mandible of a wild boar on its chest. The skull displays prominent supraorbital ridges and jutting jaw, but the rounded braincase of modern humans. When found, it was assumed to be an advanced Neanderthal, but is today generally assumed to be a modern human, if a very robust one.

== Qafzeh ==
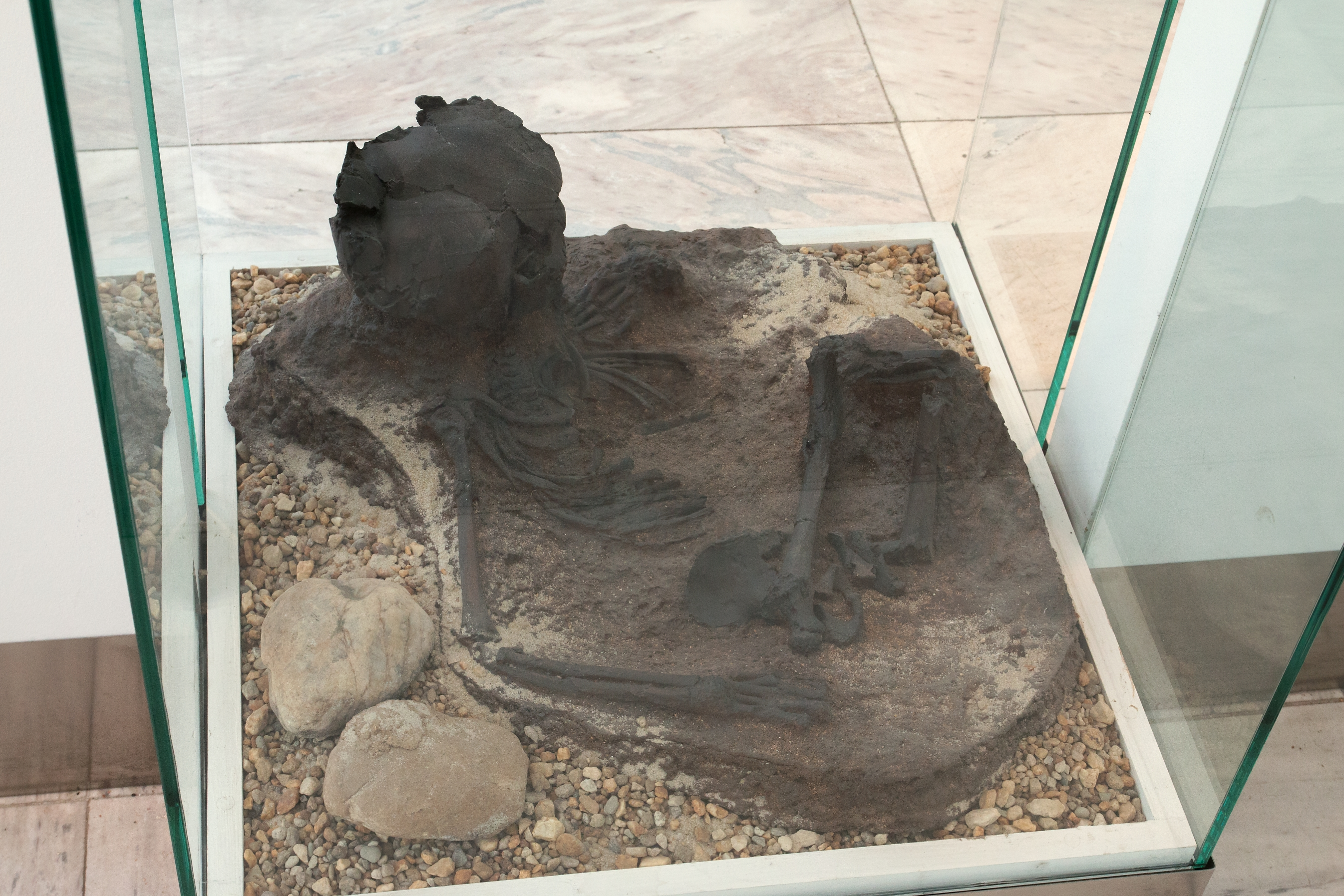
Cast of the funeral of a child from Qafzeh

Qafzeh cave opens onto a wall of Wadi el Hadj in the flank of Mount Precipice. Excavation of the cave by René Neuville began in 1934 and resulted in the discovery of the remains of 5 individuals in the Mousterian stratigraphic levels, which was then called the Levalloiso-Mousterian (see Levallosian). The lower layers of the cave were later dated to 92,000 years ago, and a series of hearths, several human bodies, flint artifacts (side scrapers, disc cores, and points), animal bones (gazelle, horse, fallow deer, wild ox, and rhinoceros), a collection of sea shells, lumps of red ochre, and an incised cortical flake were found.

The remains of 15 hominids, 8 of them children, were recovered in total from Qafzeh within a Mousterian archaeological context and dated to ca. 95,000 years ago. Remains of Qafzeh 8, 9, 10, 11, 13 and 15 were burials.

The marine shells (Glycymeris bivalves) were brought from Mediterranean Sea shore some 35 km away, and were recovered from layers earlier than most of the bodies save one. The shells were complete, naturally perforated, and several showed traces of having been strung (perhaps as a necklace), and a few had ochre stains on them.

The various layers at Qafzeh were dated to an average of 96,000–115,000 years ago with the electron spin resonance method and 92,000 years ago with the thermoluminescence method.

=== Qafzeh 9 and 10 ===
Two skeletons were found in 1969 in the same burial, the skeleton of a late adolescent whose sex is debated (Qafzeh 9), and the skeleton of a young child (Qafzeh 10). Qafzeh 9 has a high forehead, lack of occipital bun, a distinct chin, but a prognathic face. Qafzeh 9 offers the earliest evidence of associated mandibular and dental pathological conditions (i.e. non-ossifying fibroma of the mandible, pre-eruptive intracoronal resorption and osteochondritis dissecans of the temporomandibular joint) among early anatomically modern humans. Qafzeh 9 and 10 share distinctive anatomical traits not observed in the other individuals.

=== Qafzeh 11 ===
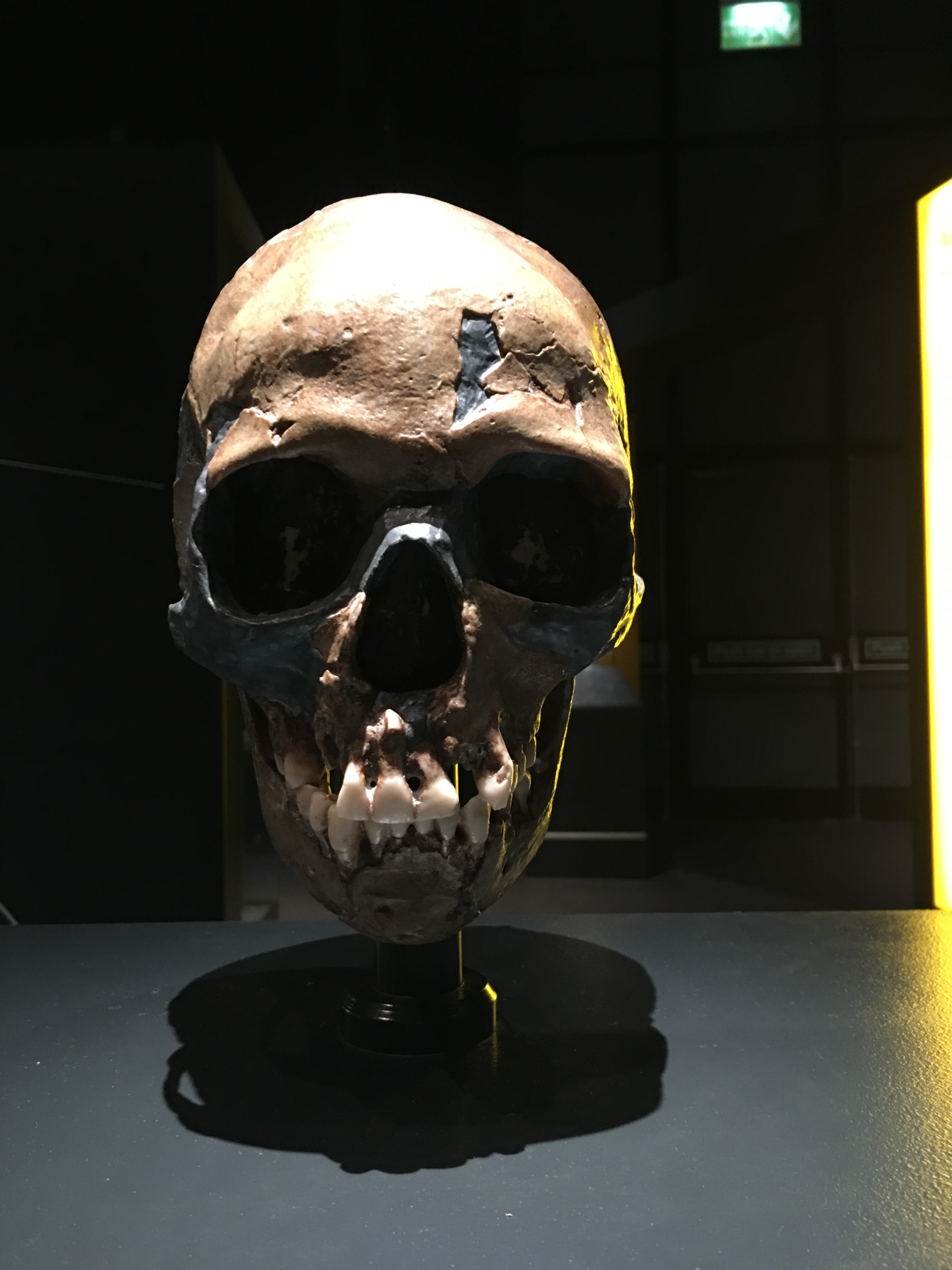
Cast of Qafzeh 11

Found in 1971 was the body of an adolescent (aged about 13 years) found in a pit dug in the bedrock. The skeleton was lying on its back, with the legs bent to the side and both hands placed on either side of the neck, and in the hands were the antlers of a large red deer clasped to the chest.

=== Qafzeh 12 ===
A child of about 3 years old who manifests with skeletal abnormalities that indicate hydrocephalus.

=== Qafzeh 25 ===
Qafzeh 25 was discovered in 1979. Due to his overall robustness and tooth wear, the remains are believed to be of a young male. The fossil has undergone heavy taphonomical damages including a complete crushing of the skull and mandible. Its inner ear morphology confirm that it is an anatomically modern human.

== See also ==
- Archaeology of Israel
- List of human evolution fossils
- Manot 1
- Qesem cave
