= Nahal Me'arot Nature Reserve =

Archaeological site in northern Israel

UNESCO World Heritage Site
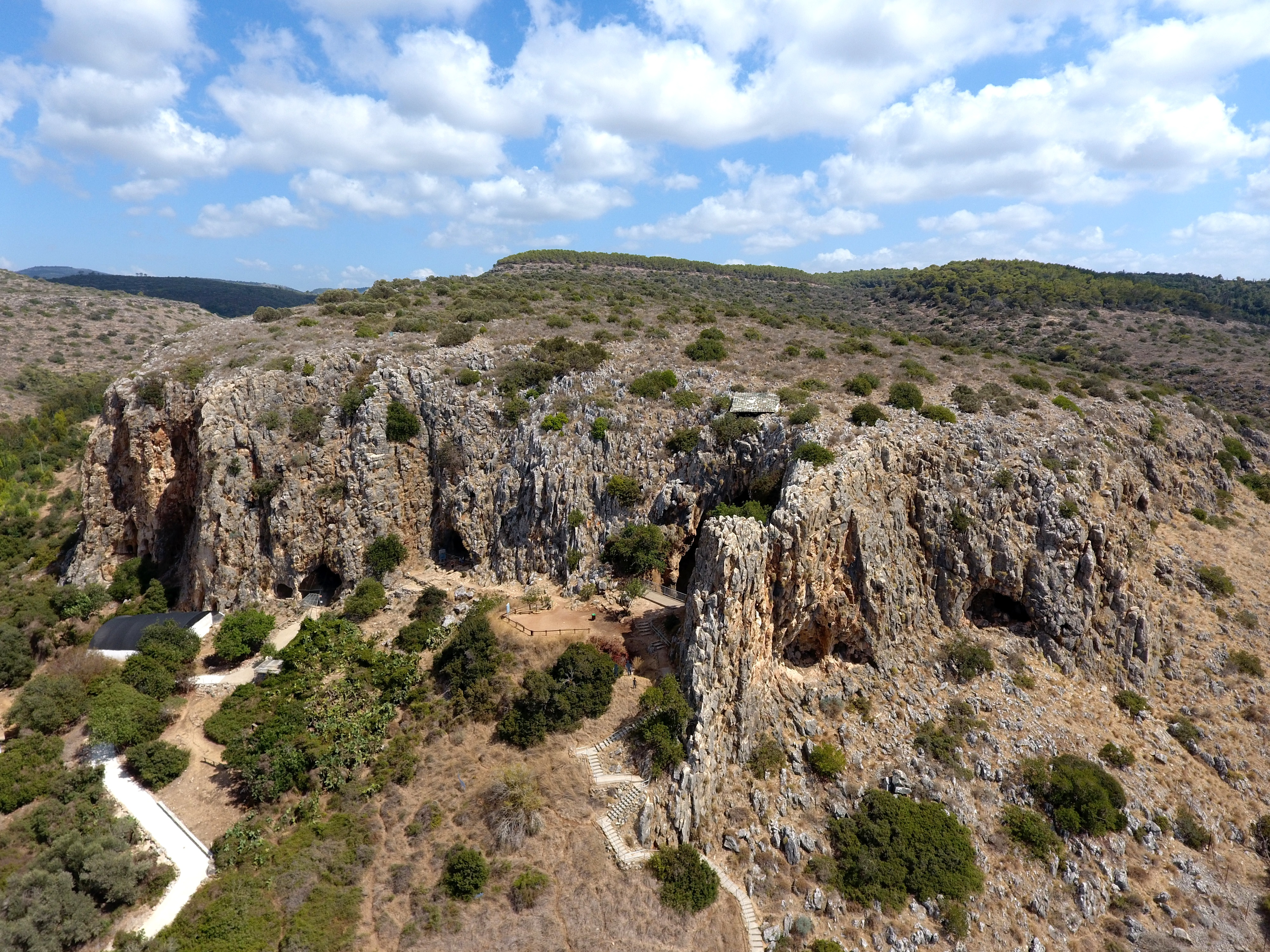

- Location within Near East Location within West and Central Asia Location within Israel
- Official name: Sites of Human Evolution at Mount Carmel: The Nahal Me’arot / Wadi el‑Mughara Caves
- Location: Mount Carmel, Israel
- Criteria: Cultural: (iii), (v)
- Reference: 1393
- Inscription: 2012 (36th Session)
- Area: 54 ha (130 acres)
- Buffer zone: 370 ha (910 acres)
- Coordinates: 32°40′12″N 34°57′55″E

The Caves of Nahal Me’arot / Wadi el-Mughara ("Caves Creek"), named here by the Hebrew and Arabic name of the valley where they are located, are a UNESCO Site of Human Evolution in the Carmel mountain range near Haifa in northern Israel.

The four UNESCO-listed caves are:

- Tabun or Tanur Cave (lit.: "Oven")
- Gamal or el-Jamal Cave ("Camel")
- El Wad or Nahal Cave ("Stream")
- Skhul or Gedi Cave ("Kid")

The four caves were proclaimed a site of "outstanding universal value" by UNESCO in 2012. They are protected within a nature reserve.

The caves were used for habitation by hominins and prehistoric humans and contain unique evidence of very early burials, at the archaeological site of el-Wad cave in the Nahal Me'arot Nature Reserve.

== Gallery ==
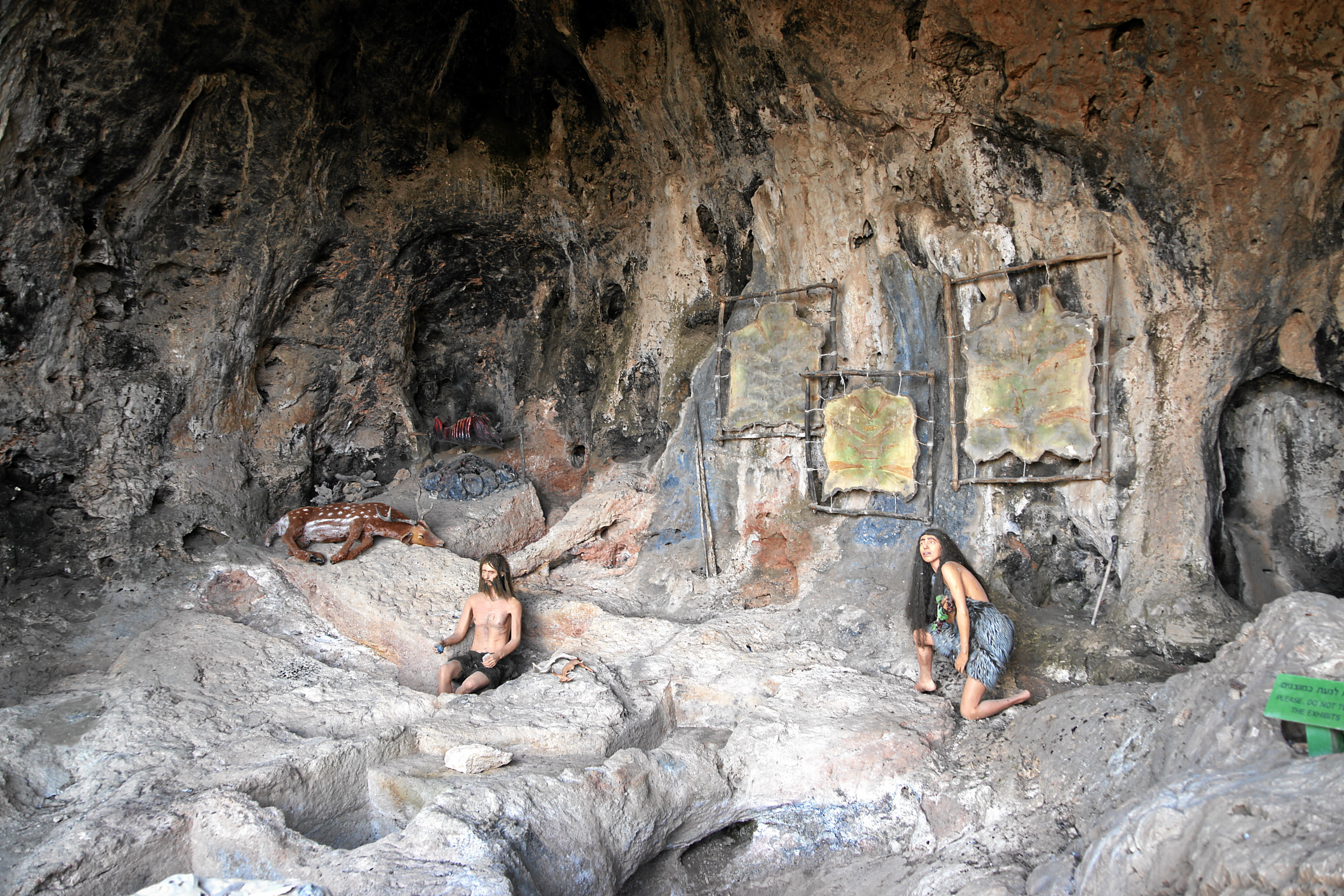
A Paleolithic reconstitution in Jamal Cave

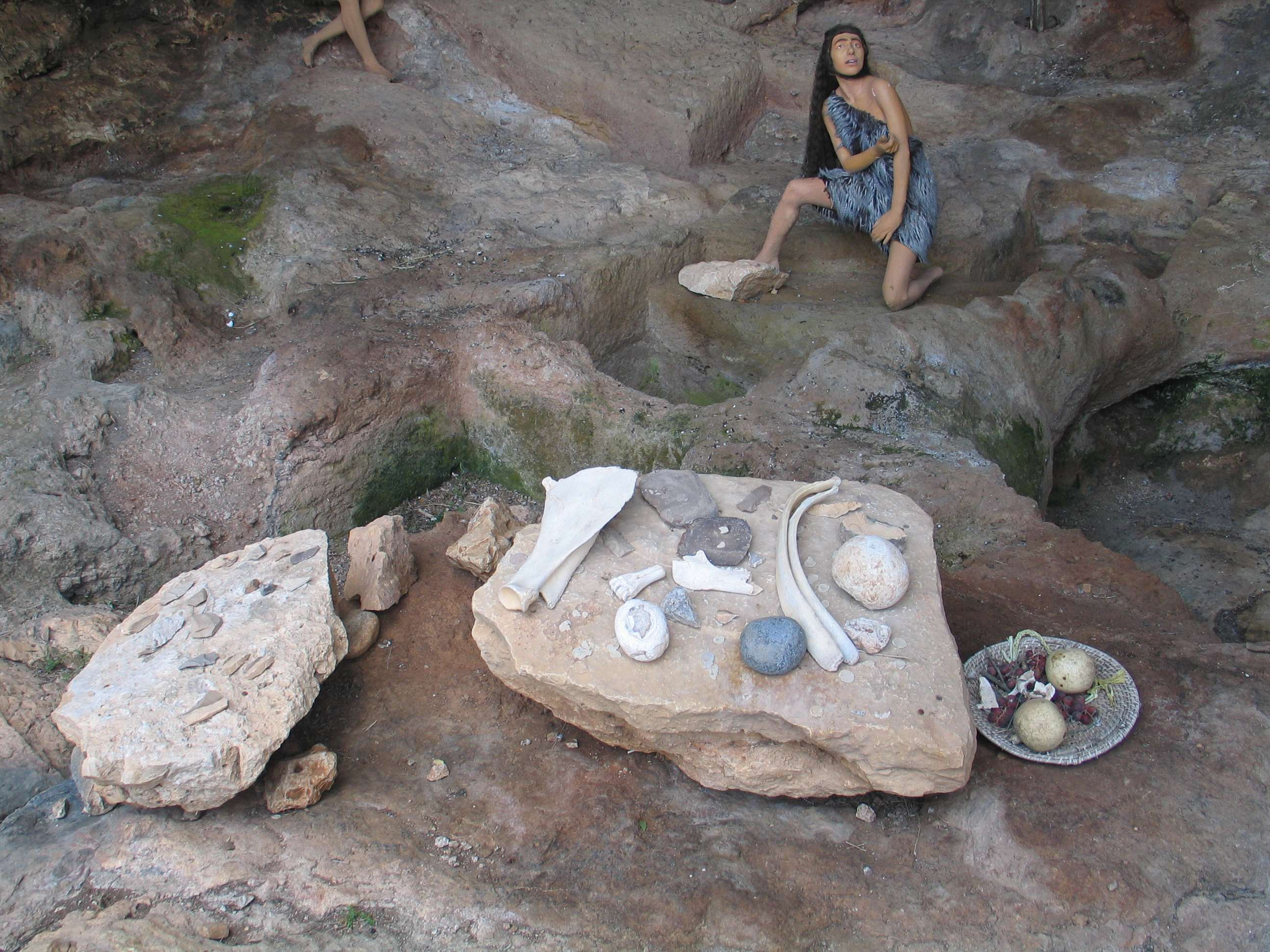
Paleolithic tools in Jamal Cave (replica)

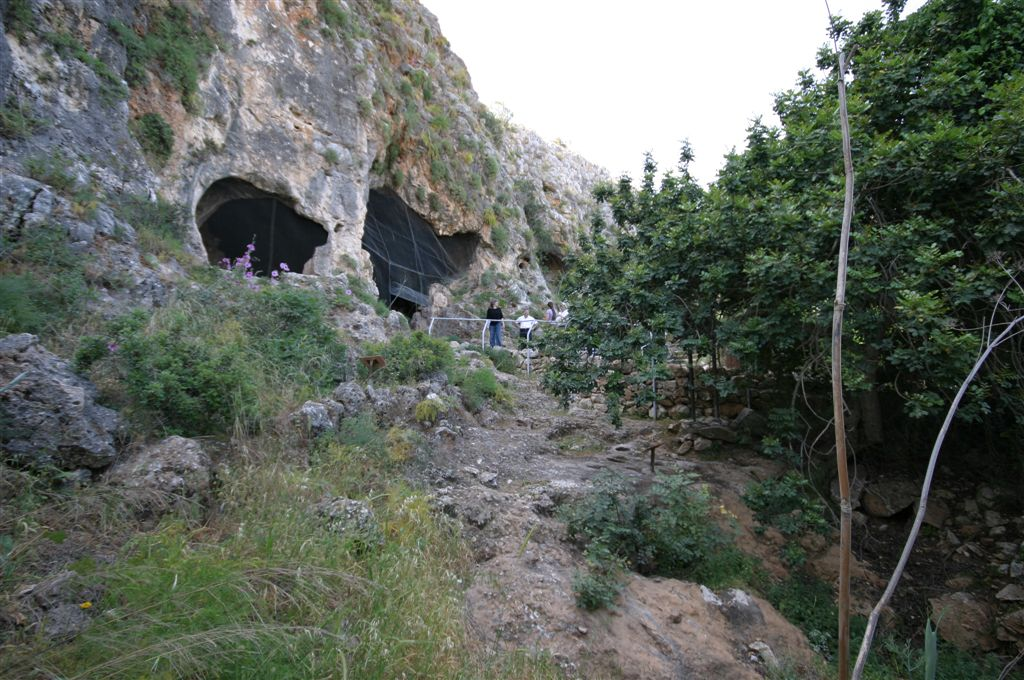
Entrance to el‑Wad Cave

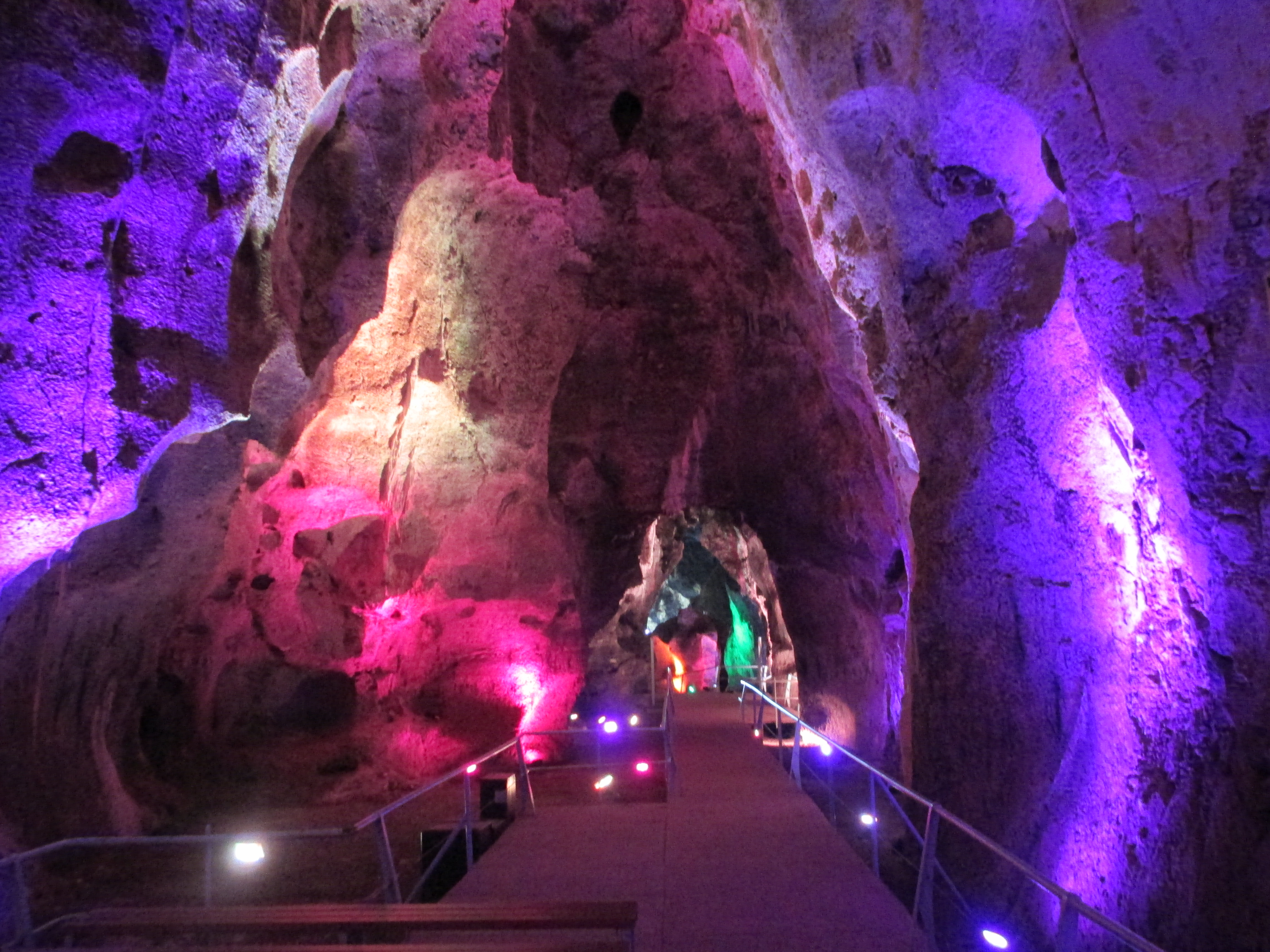
Inside el‑Wad Cave

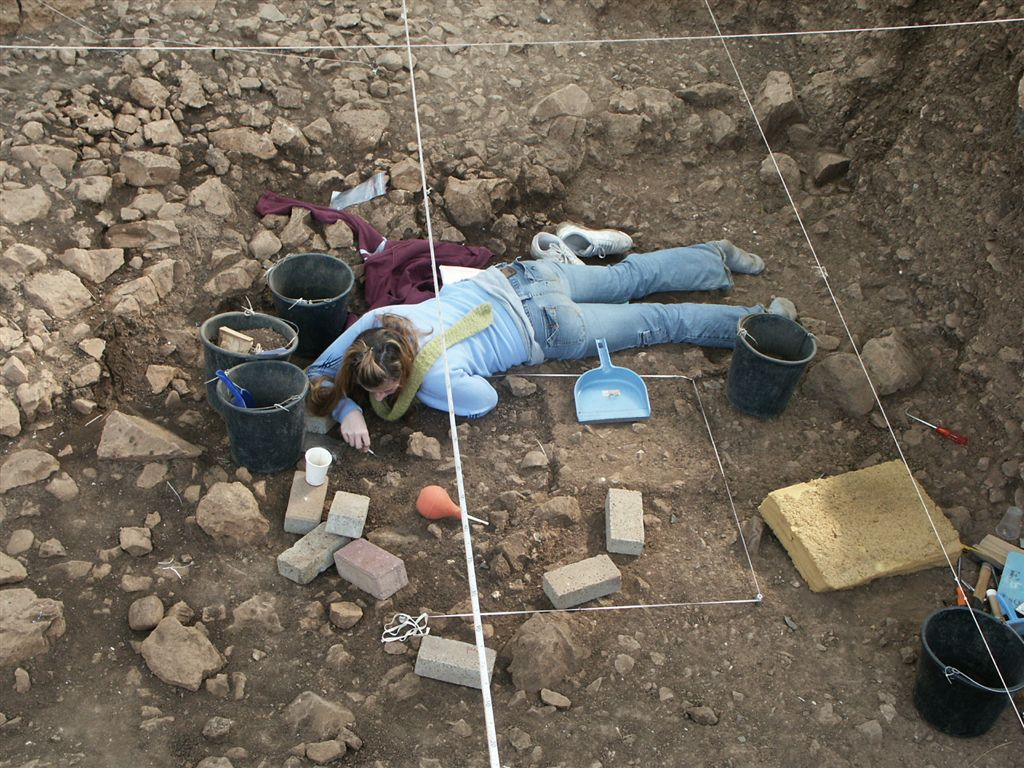
Excavation work in el‑Wad Cave's terrace

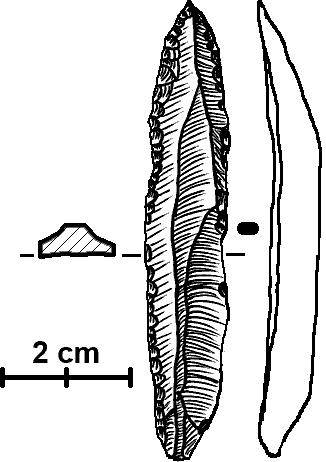
El‑Wad point microlith

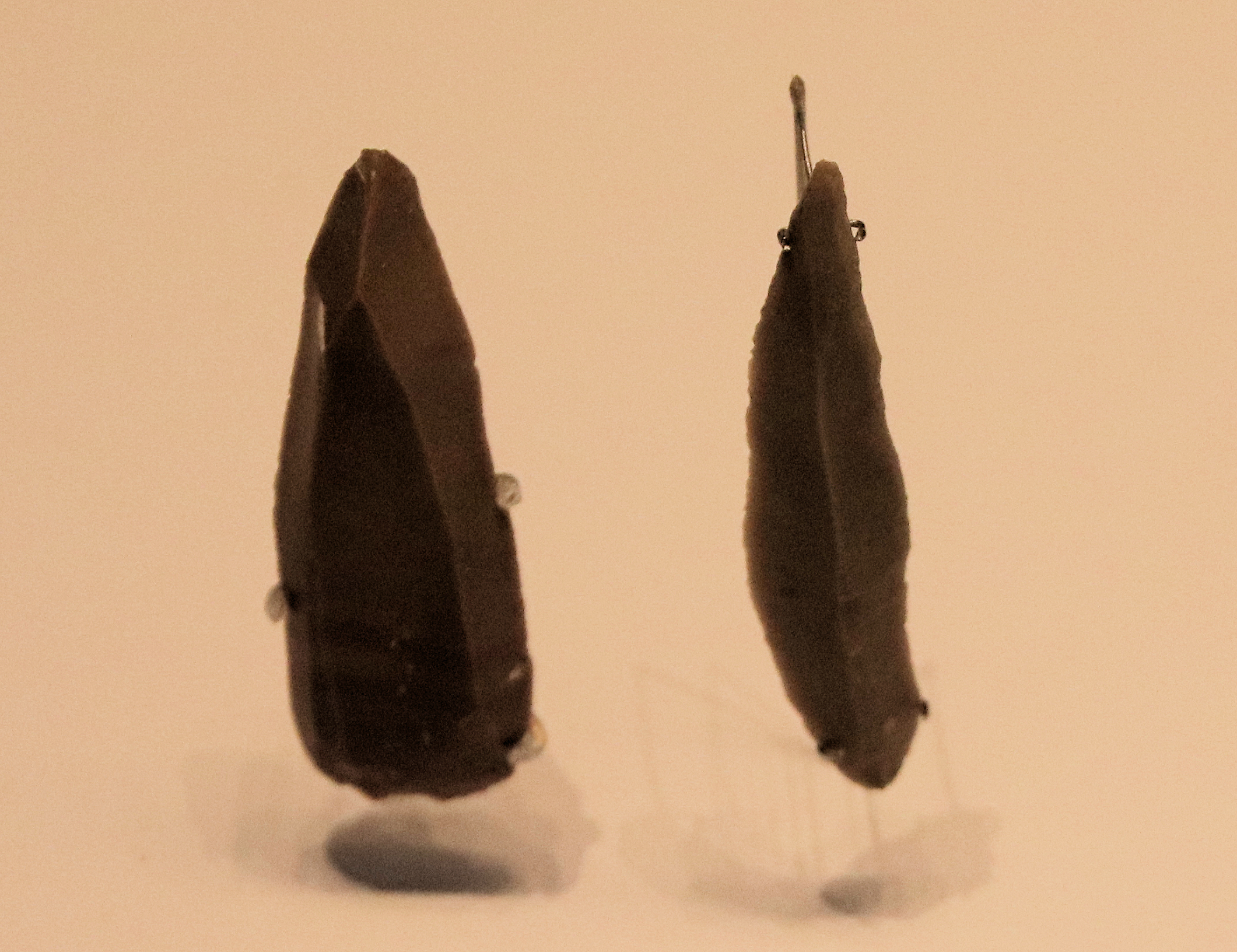
Flint stone points, Boqer Tahtit Cave (Ein Avdat) and el‑Wad Cave, 50000 – 28000 BP (Israel Museum)

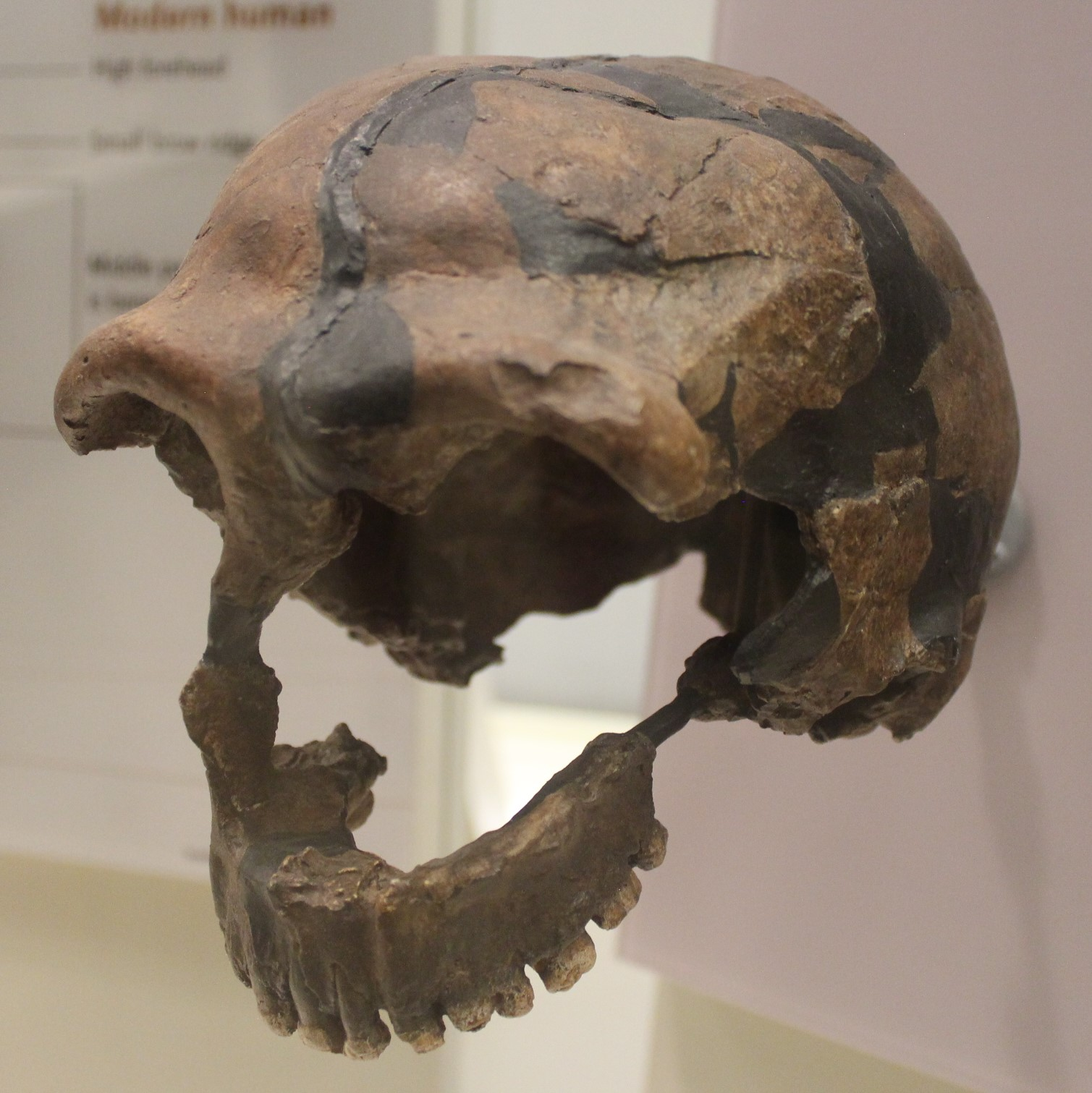
Homo neanderthalensis fossil from Tabun C1 (replica). 120000 – 50000 BP (National Museum of Natural History)

== See also ==
- List of archaeological sites in Israel and Palestine
- List of World Heritage Sites in Israel and Jerusalem
- National parks and nature reserves of Israel
- Prehistory of the Levant
- Skhul and Qafzeh hominins
