= El Wad =

Epipalaeolithic archaeological site in Mount Carmel, Israel

- HaNahal Cave
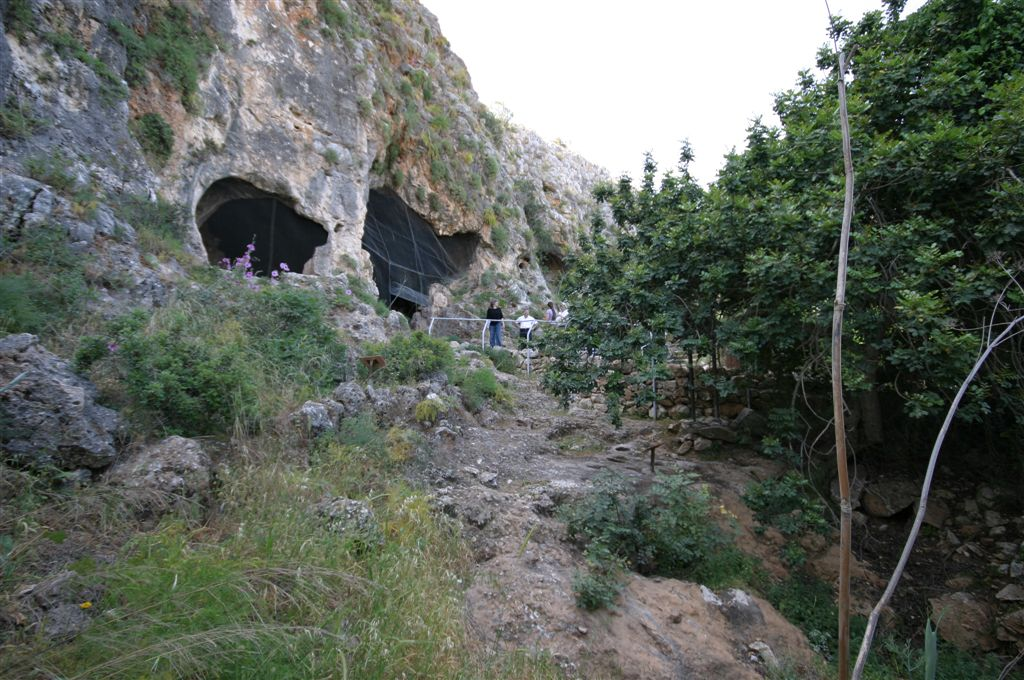
- Entrance to the cave

- Location within Haifa region of Israel
- 32°40′14.5″N 34°57′58.8″E
- Type: Archaeological site
- Periods: Upper Paleolithic; Epipalaeolithic
- Cultures: Ahmarian; Aurignacian; Kebaran; Natufian
- Location: Hof HaCarmel Regional Council, Haifa District, Israel
- Region: Mount Carmel, Israeli coastal plain
- Part of: Nahal Me'arot Nature Reserve

El Wad is an archaeological site of the Epipalaeolithic Near East in Mount Carmel, Israel. The site has two components: El Wad Cave, also known as Mughārat al-Wād (Arabic: مغارة الواد) or HaNahal Cave (Hebrew: מערת הנחל, lit. 'The Stream Cave'); and El Wad Terrace, located immediately outside the cave.

Together with the nearby sites of Tabun Cave, Jamal Cave, and Skhul Cave, el Wad is part of the Nahal Me'arot Nature Reserve, a national park and UNESCO World Heritage Site.

== Background and research history ==
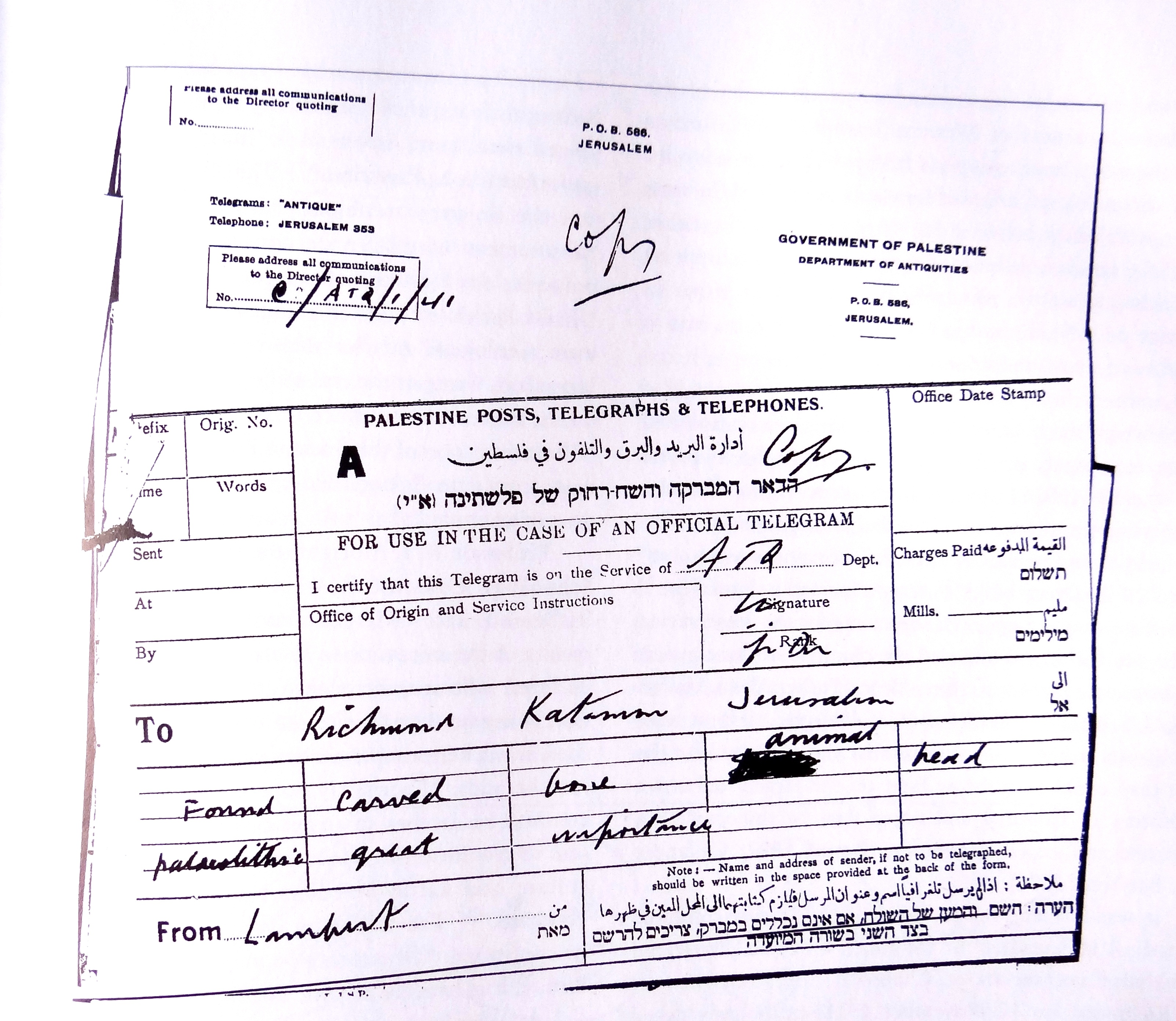
Telegram from Charles Lambert to Ernest Richmond, the director of the Department of Antiquities, about the discovery of prehistoric art at El Wad. The message reads: "Found carved bone animal head, palaeolithic, great importance."

El Wad is one of a number of significant prehistoric archaeological sites in the caves of Wadi el-Mughara in Mount Carmel, now protected as the national nature reserve and UNESCO World Heritage Site. However in the 1920s, very little was known of the prehistory of the region, and the sites were threatened by quarrying for the construction of the Port of Haifa. In 1928, British archaeologist Charles Lambert conducted a trial excavation at El Wad on behalf of the Department of Antiquities of Mandatory Palestine to assess the area's archaeological value. Lambert's findings, especially the "sensational" discovery of a bone handle carved in the shape of an animal, "the first prehistoric work of art recorded from the Near East", established the scientific importance of the caves and prevented them being destroyed in the quarrying.

The following year, the Department of Antiquities asked Dorothy Garrod to suspend her excavations at Shuqba Cave to deal with the "urgent matter" of investigating the el-Mughara caves. Garrod directed large-scale excavations at El Wad for the next six years. She quickly recognised similarities between the stone tools found at El Wad and her previous excavations at Shuqba cave, naming the newly discovered industry the Natufian, after Wadi en-Natuf near Shuqba, and tentatively linking it to the European Mesolithic, based on the fact that both used microlithic technology. Garrod began her excavations with Lambert's soundings and extended them cover most of the interior of the cave and exterior terrace.

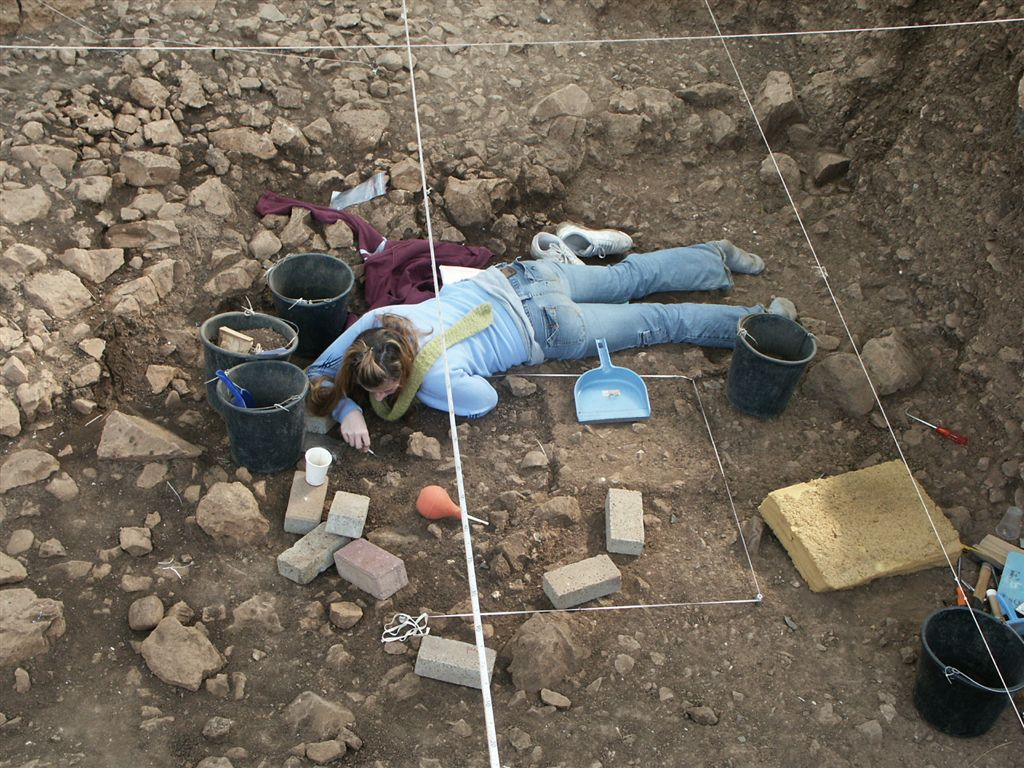
Excavations at El Wad Terrace, 2007

In 1980-1981, François Valla and Ofer Bar-Yosef conducted brief excavations on the terrace to re-examine Garrod's stratigraphy. In 1988–1989, Mina Weinstein-Evron excavated a small area at the back of the cave that had not been removed by Garrod. Large-scale excavations of the terrace resumed in 1994, directed by Weinstein-Evron, Daniel Kaufman, and Reuven Yeshurun of the Zinman Institute of Archaeology, and are ongoing.

== See also ==
- Prehistory of the Levant
