= Prehistory of the Levant =

Period of Levantine history

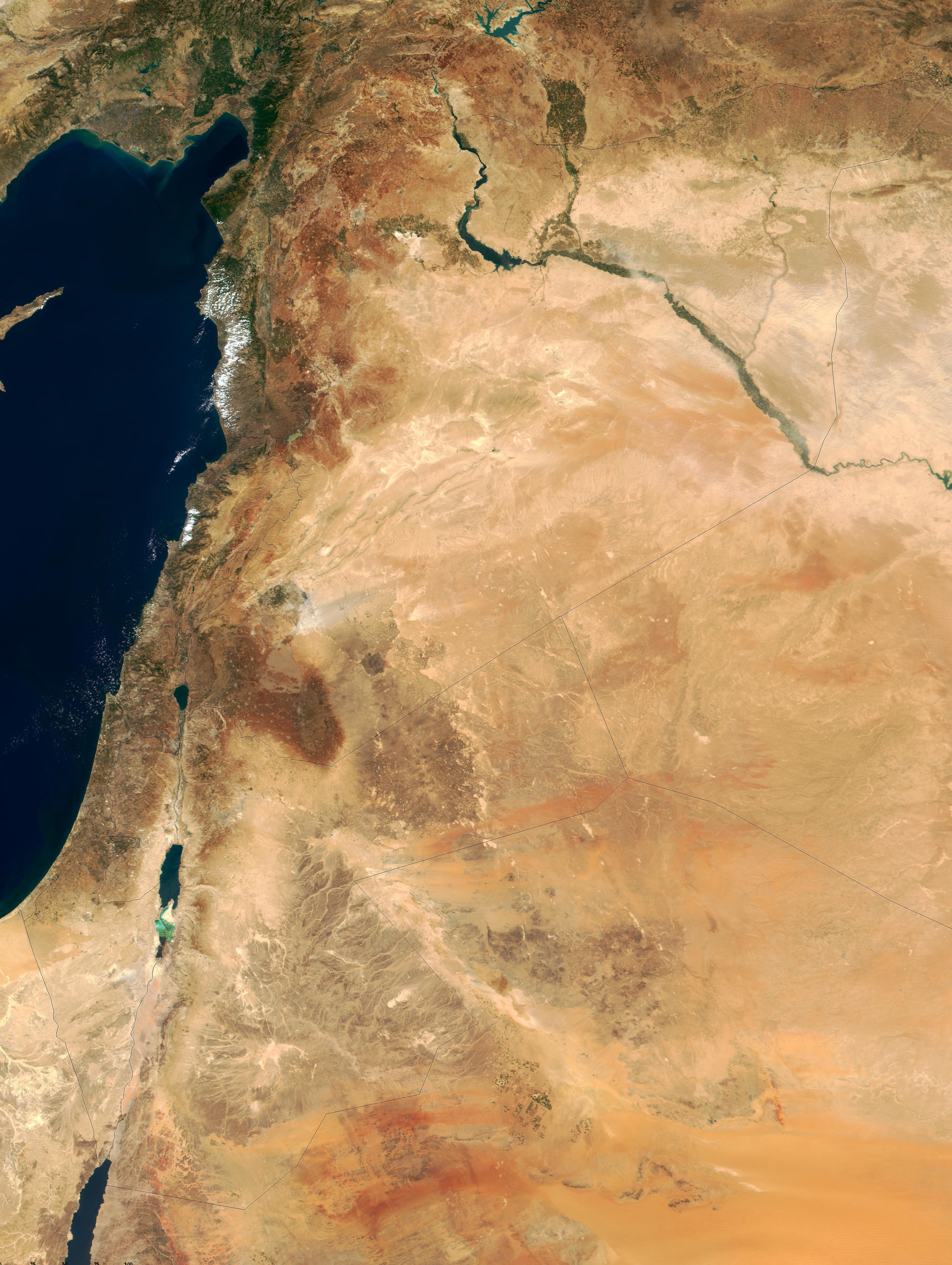
Satellite view of the Levant

The prehistory of the Levant includes the various cultural changes that occurred, as revealed by archaeological evidence, prior to recorded traditions in the area of the Levant. Archaeological evidence suggests that Homo sapiens and other hominid species originated in Africa (see hominid dispersal) and that one of the routes taken to colonize Eurasia was through the Sinai Peninsula desert and the Levant, which means that this is one of the most occupied locations in the history of the Earth. Not only have many cultures lived here, but also many species of the genus Homo. In addition, this region is one of the centers for the development of agriculture.

== Impact of location, climate, routes ==
Geographically, the area is divided between a coastal plain, the hill country to the east, and the Jordan Valley joining the Sea of Galilee to the Dead Sea. Rainfall decreases from the north to the south, with the result that the northern region has generally been more economically developed than the southern one.

At the latest from the Neolithic period onwards, the area's location at the center of three trade routes linking three continents made it the meeting place for religious and cultural influences from Egypt, Syria, Mesopotamia, and Asia Minor:

1. Coastal route, the Via Maris, connecting Gaza and the coast of Philistia north to Joppa and Megiddo, travelling north through Byblos to Phoenicia, and Anatolia.
2. Hill route through the Negev, Kadesh Barnea, to Hebron and Jerusalem, and then north to Samaria, Shechem, Shiloh, Beth Shean and Hazor, and thence to Kadesh and Damascus.
3. The Kings Highway, north from Aqaba, east of the Jordan through Amman to Damascus, and connected to the "frankincense road" north from Yemen and South Arabia.

The area seems to have suffered from acute periods of desiccation and reduced rainfall, influencing the relative importance of settled versus nomadic ways of living. The cycle seems to have been repeated, during which a reduced rainfall increases periods of fallow, with farmers spending increasing amounts of time with their flocks and away from cultivation. Eventually, they revert fully to nomadism. When rainfall increases, they settle around important water sources and increase cultivation. Increased prosperity leads to a revival of inter-regional and, eventually, international trade. The growth of villages rapidly proceeds to the increased prosperity of market towns and city-states, which attract the attention of neighbouring great powers, who may invade to capture control of regional trade networks and possibilities for tribute and taxation. Warfare leads to opening the region to pandemics, with resultant depopulation, overuse of fragile soils and a reversion to nomadic pastoralism.

== Palaeolithic period (1,850,000 - 20,000 years ago) ==
=== Lower Paleolithic period (1.85 million – 200,000 years ago) ===
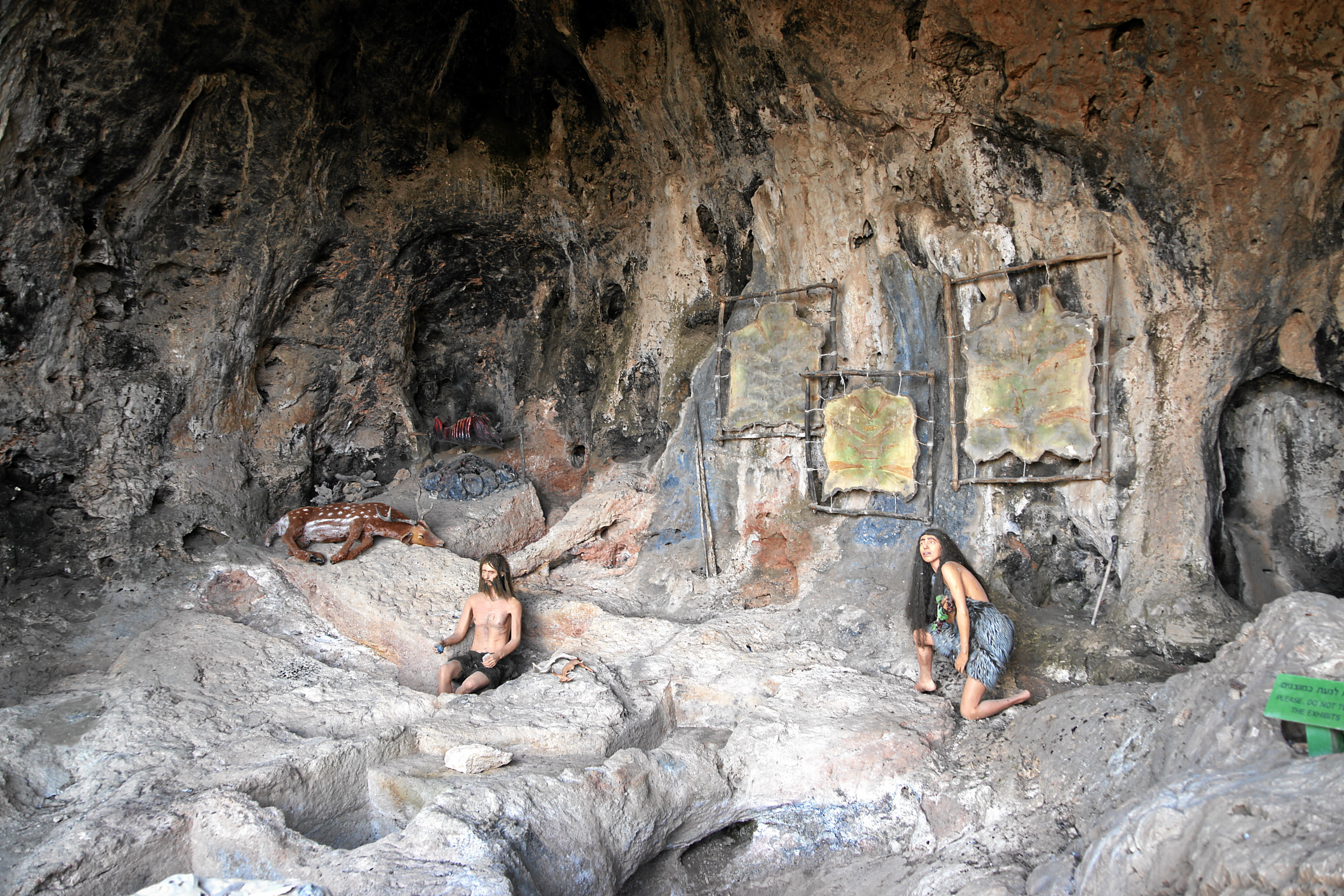
The display inside the camel cave at the Nahal Me'arot Nature Reserve depicts the life of prehistoric people in the Levant. (the Acheulo-Yabrudian culture)

The earliest traces of the human occupation in the Levant are documented in Ubeidiya in the Jordan Valley of the Southern Levant. The site was dated to c. 1.4 million years ago, but further research has fixed its chronological context to 1.5–1.2 million years ago. The site yielded stone tools typical of the Acheulean industry which appears in East Africa as early as c. 1.76 million years ago. An earlier site is found in Dmanisi, Georgia, dated to 1.85–1.78 million years ago suggest the existence of other sites in the Levant which are yet to be found. Stone tools of the Oldowan industry, preceding the Acheulian, were found in the Negev and Syrian deserts and support the presence of pre-Acheulian cultures in the Levantine corridor, but their chronological context cannot be determined.

==== Ubeidiya - Early Acheulian (c. 1.5 – 1.2 million years ago) ====
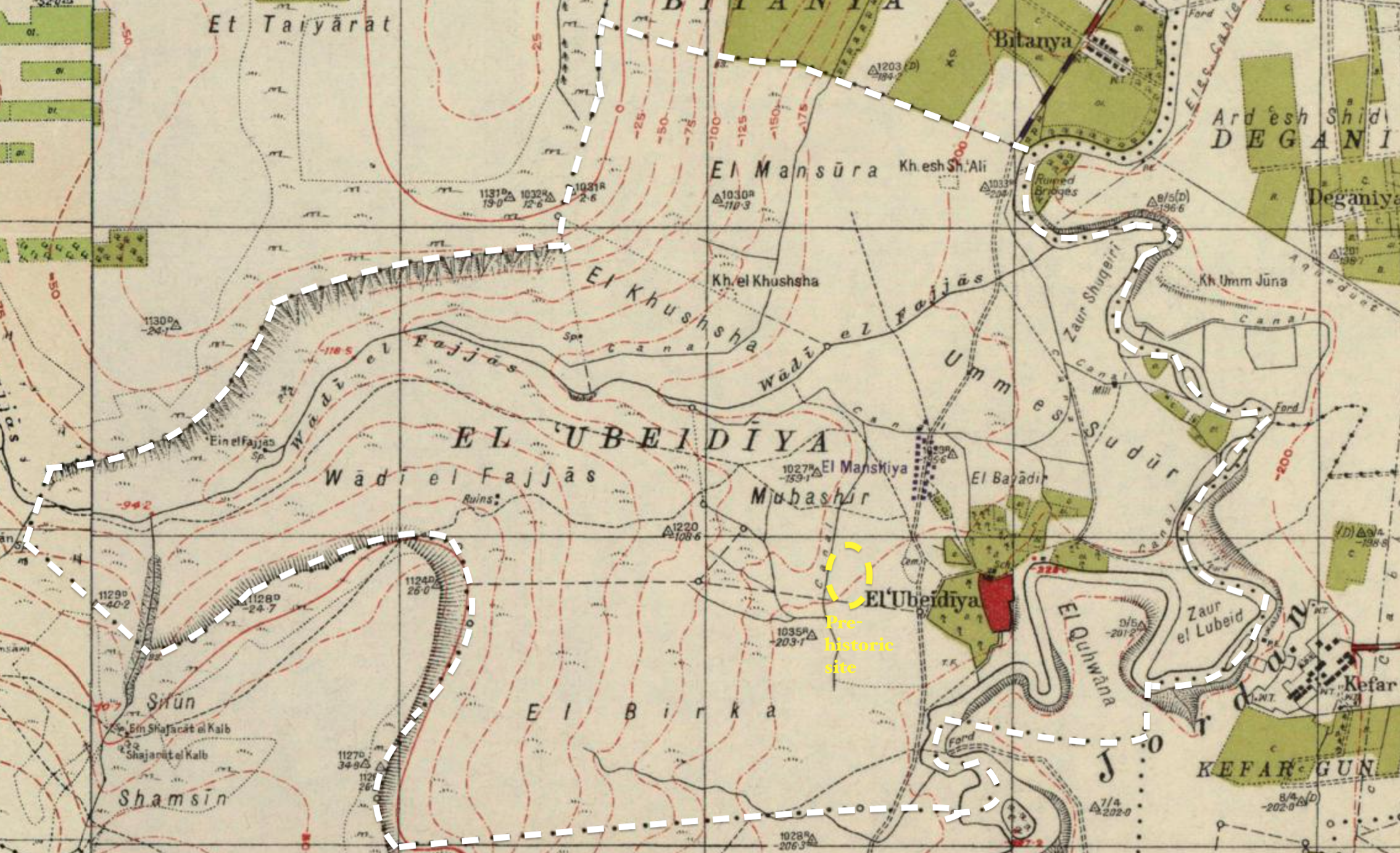
1940s Survey of Palestine showing the location Tel Ubeidiya at Ubeidiya, Tiberias and the separate Ubeidiya prehistoric site discovered in 1959.

Ubeidiya prehistoric site is an open site that existed alongside the extinct Lake Ubeidiya whose shores were inhabited by over a hundred Asian and African animal species including mammals such as giraffes, Syrian elephants, Persian fallow deer, mountain and Dorcas gazelles, and the now-extinct pelorovis; birds; reptiles; amphibians; and insects. Some of these animals have been hunted by hominins who inhabited the site, as evidenced by the cut marks observed on the fossilized bones. The stone tools found in Ubeidiya include hand axes, picks, chopping tools, and spheroids. These tools have been attested to the Early Acheulian industry. The tools show a preference for specific rock types such as basalt, limestone and flint for particular tool types. This implies a sophisticated understanding of raw materials by the hominins who located and selected them for production. Other stone tool assemblages in the Levant have been attested to the early Acheulean but lack sufficient dating evidence to compare with Ubeidiya's finds. These sites include Abbassia near the Nile, Evron Quarry and Zihor in Israel and al-Lataminah in Syria.

==== Daughters of Jacob Bridge Large Flake Acheulian (c. 790,000 – 650,000 years ago) ====
North of Ubeidiya is the crucial site of Daughters of Jacob Bridge (Gesher Benot Ya'akov, abbreviated as "GBY") dated to slightly after c. 790,000 years ago. The stone tool assemblage belongs to the "Large Flake" stage of the Acheulian, testifying to an advanced knapping technique. GBY provides information on many aspects of the life of its inhabitants: Many large mammal bones that were found at the site, including those of the elephant Palaeoloxodon recki, display evidence of butchery by the early humans. Nuts and tools used to crack them, as well as fish bones, were collected. The earliest wooden artifact - a plank with evidence of polishing - was found at the site and one of the earliest traces of fire use. In some layers, the organization of living space was observed, with certain activities limited to specific areas at the site.

==== Late Acheulian (c. 500,000 – 400,000 years ago) ====
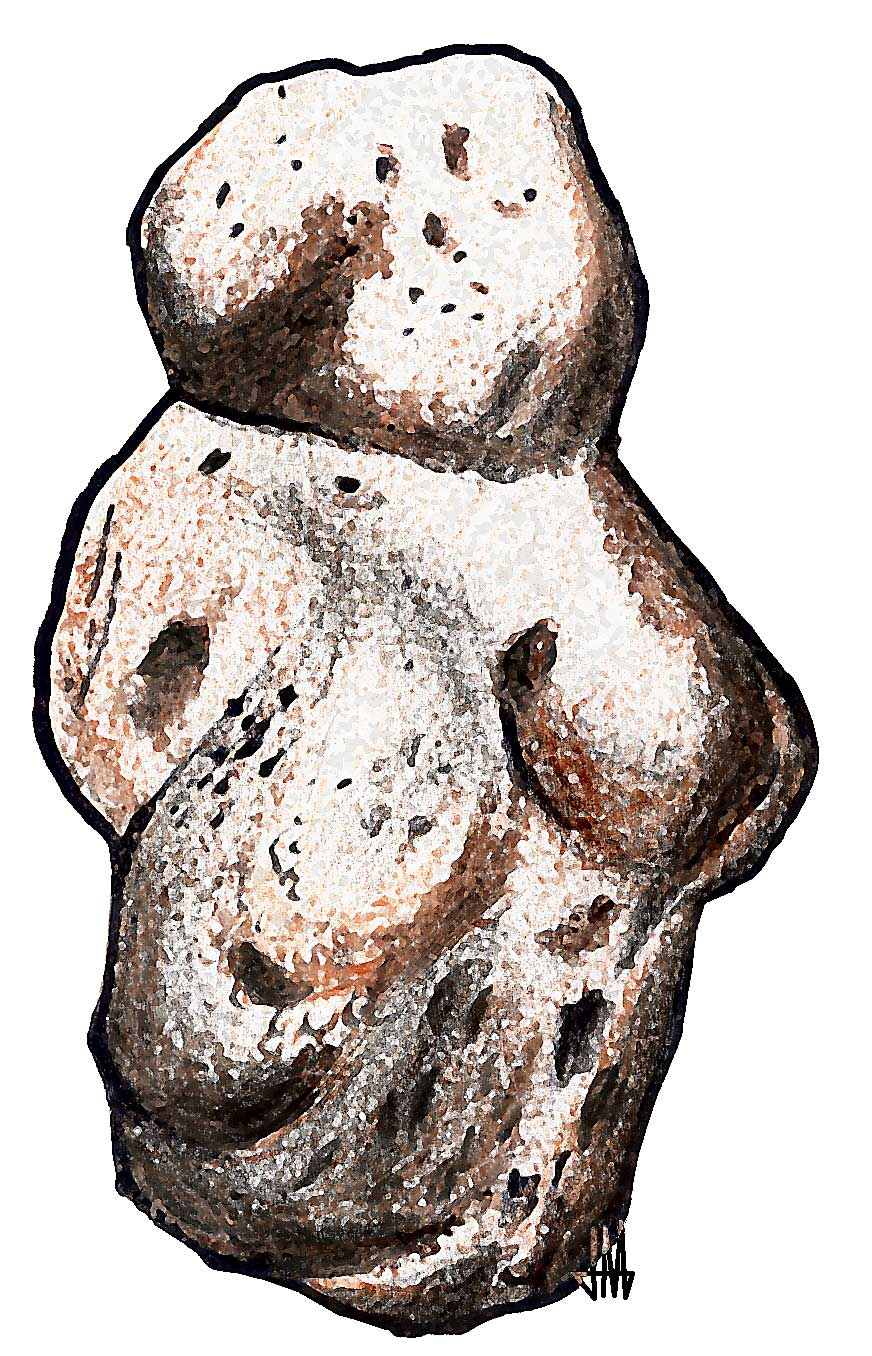
Illustration of the Venus of Berekhat Ram

The late stage of the Acheulian industry is observed in thousands of sites and find spots in the Middle East, though only a few were excavated. Most of the sites did not yield enough datable evidence. The site at Lake Ram in the Golan Heights was dated based on the basalt flows below and above to an unknown timespan between c. 800,000–233,000 years ago. More accurate dates from Ma'ayan Baruch and the Revadim Quarry in Israel provide the timeframe of c. 500,000–400,000 years ago. Late Acheulian sites and finds are found spread all across the regions of the Levant, including the desert regions from prehistoric Arabia, such as areas in modern-day Saudi Arabia and Jordan, primarily associated with oases, as well as the coastal plains and rift valleys of Israel, Lebanon and Syria. This distribution of sites in various regions of different conditions indicates either a more suitable climate in this period (the Chibanian stage of the Pleistocene) or alternatively better human adapting skills. The earliest cave sites, such as Qesem Cave, also appear in this stage. Unlike the earlier Acheulian industries in the Levant, flint is the primary material used for tool making, with the handaxe being the primary tool. The toolmakers developed different variants of handaxes different in shape and function, which replaced other tools such as cleavers. Some of the most significant assemblages of stone tools are found in Nadaouiyeh (in central Syria), Tabun, Um Qatafa and Ma'ayan Baruch (in Israel). These sites yield an enormous amount of stone tools, reaching several thousands. An important discovery from Lake Ram is a stone pebble with evidence of artificial shaping and polishing, which resembles the body of a woman and thus serves as one of the earliest figurines known.

=== Middle Paleolithic period ===
The Middle Paleolithic (c. 250,000 – c. 48,000 BCE) is represented in the Levant by the Mousterian, known from numerous sites (both caves and open-air sites) through the region. The chronological subdivision of the Mousterian is based on the stratigraphic sequence of the Tabun Cave. Middle Paleolithic human remains include both the Neandertals (Kebara, Amud and Tabun caves) and the anatomically modern humans (Misliya, Skhul, Qafzeh and Manot caves).

=== Upper Paleolithic ===
The Upper Palaeolithic period is dated in the Levant to c. 48,000 – c. 20,000 BCE.

== Epi-Palaeolithic period (20,000 - 9,500 BCE) ==
The Epipalaeolithic period (c. 20,000 – c. 9,500 cal. BCE; also known as Mesolithic period) is characterized by significant cultural variability and wide spread of the microlithic technologies. Beginning with the appearance of the Kebaran culture (18,000–12,500 BCE) a microlithic toolkit was associated with the appearance of the bow and arrow into the area. Kebaran shows affinities with the earlier Helwan phase in the Egyptian Fayyum, and may be associated with a movement of people across the Sinai associated with the climatic warming after the Late Glacial Maxima of 20,000 BCE. Kebaran affiliated cultures spread as far as Southern Turkey. The latest part of the period (c. 12,500 – c. 9,500 cal. BCE) is the time of flourishing of the Natufian culture and development of sedentism among the hunter-gatherers.

=== Natufian ===
This culture existed from about 13,000 to 9,800 BCE in the Levant. Numerous archaeological excavations have led to a relatively well defined understanding of these people. Two of the most significant aspects of this culture were their large community sizes and their sedentary lifestyles. Although the Late Natufian experienced a slight reversal in this trend (possibly a result of the cold period known as the Younger Dryas) as their community size shrank and they became more nomadic, it is believed that this culture continued through and was the foundation for the Neolithic Revolution.

== Neolithic period ==
=== Pre-Pottery and Pottery Neolithic ===
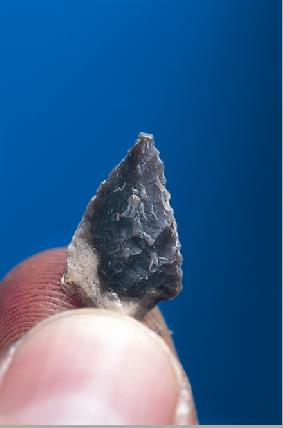
A flint arrowhead from the Neolithic period that was created by the Yarmukian culture that was discovered in the Sha'ar HaGolan area

The Neolithic is traditionally divided to the Pre-Pottery (A and B) and Pottery Late Neolithic phases. Pre-Pottery Neolithic A developed from the earlier Natufian cultures of the area. This is the time of the Neolithic Revolution and development of agriculture in West Asia, and the region's first known megaliths (and Earth's oldest known megalith, other than Göbekli Tepe, which is in the Northern Levant and from an unknown culture) with a burial chamber and tracking of the sun or other stars.

In addition, the Levant in the Neolithic (and later, in the Chalcolithic) was involved in large scale, far reaching trade.

=== Chalcolithic period ===
Trade on an impressive scale and covering large distances continued during the Chalcolithic (c. 4500–3300 BCE). Obsidian found in the Chalcolithic levels at what is now Gilat in Israel have had their origins traced via elemental analysis to three sources in southern Anatolia: Hotamış Dağ, Mount Göllü, and as far east as Mount Nemrut, 500 km (310 mi) east of the other two sources. This indicates a vast trade circle reaching as far as the northern Fertile Crescent at these three Anatolian sites.

The Ghassulian created the basis of the Mediterranean economy, which has characterized the area ever since. A Chalcolithic culture, the Ghassulian economy was a mixed agricultural system consisting of extensive cultivation of wheat and barley, intensive horticulture of vegetable crops, commercial production of vines and olives, and a combination of transhumance and nomadic pastoralism. The Ghassulian culture, according to Juris Zarins, developed out of the earlier Munhata phase of what he calls the "circum-Arabian nomadic pastoral complex", probably associated with the first appearance of ancient Semitic-speaking peoples in this area.

== Bronze Age ==
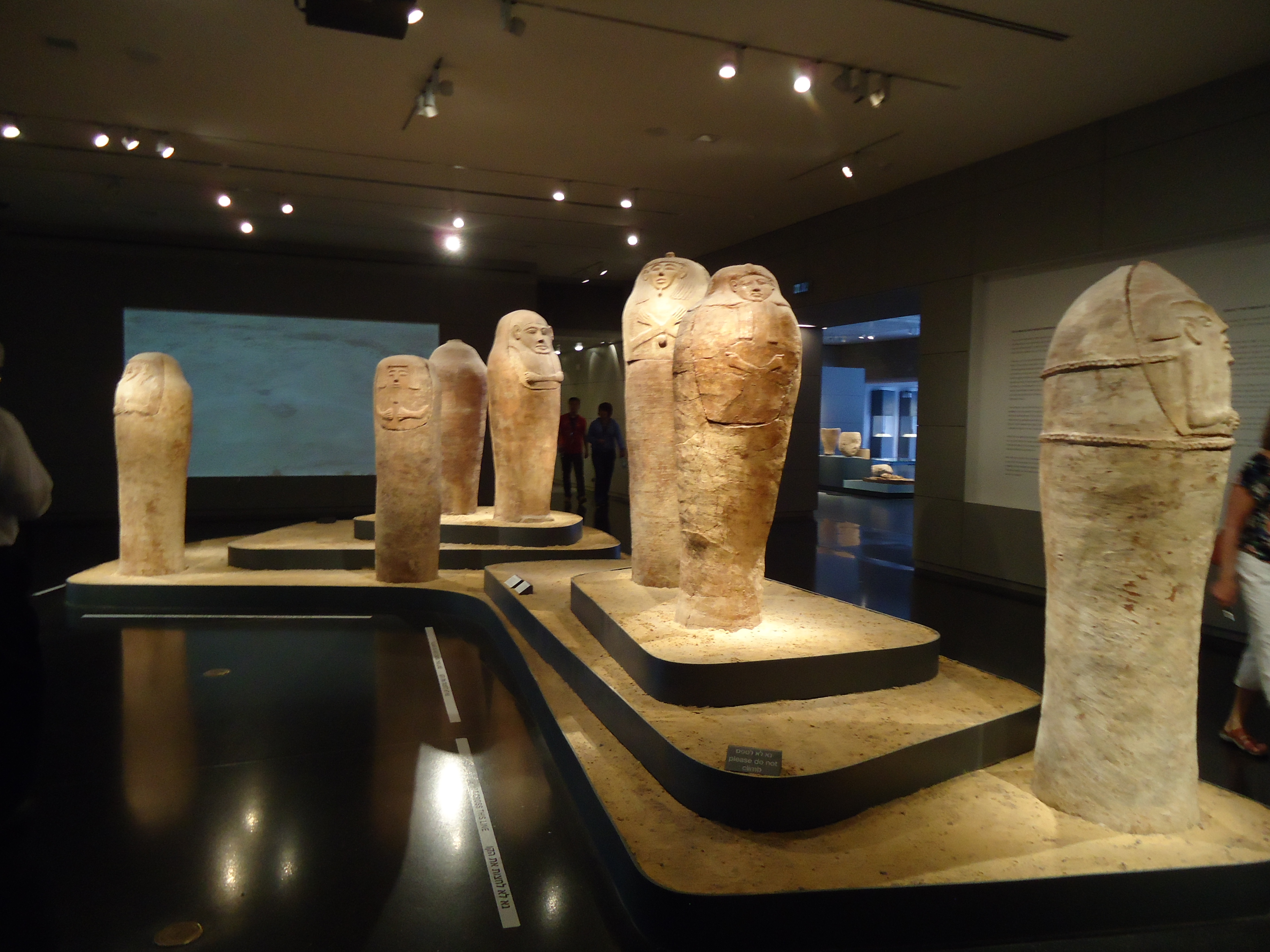
Anthropoid coffins that were discovered in Deir el-Balah from the Late Bronze Age. The items are part of the permanent display at the Israel Museum

The urban development of Canaan lagged considerably behind that of Egypt, Mesopotamia, and even that of Syria, where from 3500 BCE, a sizable city developed at Hamoukar. This city, which was conquered, probably by people coming from the Lower Mesopotamian city of Uruk, saw the first connections between Syria and Lower Mesopotamia that some have suggested lying behind the Biblical Patriarchs. Urban development again began culminating in Early Bronze Age sites like Ebla, which by 2300 BCE, was incorporated once again into the empires of Sargon and Naram-Sin of Akkad. The archives of Ebla show reference to several Biblical sites, including Hazor, Jerusalem, and several people have claimed, also to Sodom and Gomorrah. The collapse of the Akkadian Empire saw the arrival of peoples using Khirbet Kerak Syro-Palestinian pottery ware which originated from the Zagros Mountains east of the Tigris. It is suspected by some Ur seals that this event marks the arrival in Syria and Palestine of the Hurrians, people later known in the Biblical tradition as Horites.

The following Middle Bronze Age period was initiated by the arrival of Amorites from Syria in Lower Mesopotamia. This period saw the pinnacle of urban development in Syria and Palestine. Archaeologists show that the chief state at this time was the city of Hazor, the head of all the Canaanite kingdoms of the northern region of Palestine. This is also the period in which ancient Semitic-speaking peoples began to appear in more significant numbers in the Nile Delta.

== See also ==
History and archaeology articles

- Genetic history of the Middle East
- History of the Levant
  - History of ancient Israel and Judah
  - History of Palestine
- Levantine archaeology
  - Archaeology of Israel
- Names of the Levant
- Near Eastern bioarchaeology
- Prehistoric Arabia
- Prehistoric Asia

Chronologies and timelines

- List of archaeological periods (Levant)
- Time periods in the Palestine region

Sites

- Gilgal I
