= Acheulo-Yabrudian complex =

Paleolithic culture in the Levant

- Alternative names: Acheulo-Yabrudian Cultural Complex (AYCC); Mugharan Tradition
- Race: Archaic humans
- Geographical range: Levant
- Period: Lower Paleolithic
- Major sites: Tabun Cave
- Preceded by: Acheulean
- Followed by: Jabroudian; Mousterian

The Acheulo-Yabrudian complex is a complex of archaeological cultures in the Levant at the end of the Lower Palaeolithic. It follows the Acheulian and precedes the Mousterian. It is also called the Mugharan Tradition or the Acheulo-Yabrudian Cultural Complex (AYCC).

The Acheulo-Yabrudian complex has three stone-tool traditions, chronologically: the Acheulo-Yabrudian, the Yabrudian and the Pre-Aurignacian or Amudian. The Yabrudian tradition is dominated by thick scrapers shaped by steep Quina retouch; the Acheuleo-Yabrudian contains Yabrudian scrapers and handaxes; and the Pre-Aurignacian/Amudian is dominated by blades and blade-tools.

== Dating ==
Determining the age period for the Acheulo-Yabrudian has been difficult as its major excavations occurred in the 1930s and 1950s, before modern radiometric dating. The recently excavated Qesem and Tabun caves, however, suggest the oldest period is about 350 kyr and the most recent 200 kyr. This would make the Lower–Middle Palaeolithic transition rapid, occurring at 215,000 BP and taking place within a 30,000 year period. Some date it earlier at 400,000-220,000 bp.

== Major sites ==
- Yabrud I in Syria
- Tabun Cave in the Mount Carmel range, Israel
- Misliya Cave, Mount Carmel, Israel
- Mugharet el-Zuttiyeh in Nahal Amud in Israel, the location of ‘Galilee Man’
- Qesem Cave, the southernmost site yet found

== See also ==
- Pre-history of the Southern Levant
