= Mina Weinstein-Evron =

Israeli archaeologist

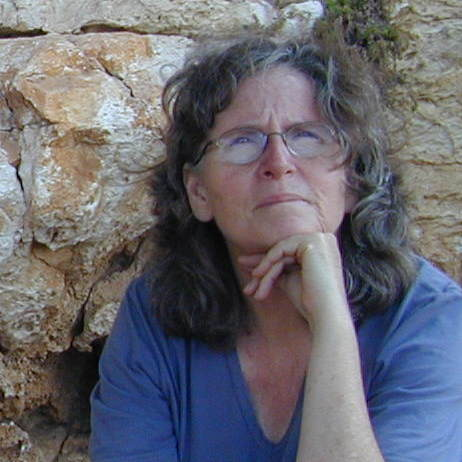
Weinstein-Evron in 2002

Mina Weinstein-Evron (Hebrew: מינה וינשטיין-עברון) is an Israeli archaeologist. She is a professor of archaeology at University of Haifa. Evron joined the faculty at University of Haifa as the head of the department of archaeology in 1991. She researches the prehistory of the Levant and Old World, palynology of the Eastern Mediterranean and Old World, the Quaternary period, and the agricultural revolution, including food production and sedentism. Evron completed a B.A. in social work, cum laude, at Bar-Ilan University in 1973. She earned a B.A. in archaeology and prehistory, cum laude, at Tel Aviv University (TAU). In 1976, she earned an M.A. in palynology and prehistory, summa cum laude, from TAU. She completed her Ph.D. in palynology in 1984 at TAU.

Weinstein-Evron has co-directed excavations at El Wad Terrace since 1994.
