= Skhul Cave =

Prehistoric cave and archaeological site in Israel

- مَغَارَة السخول (Levantine Arabic)
- Me'arat HaGedi
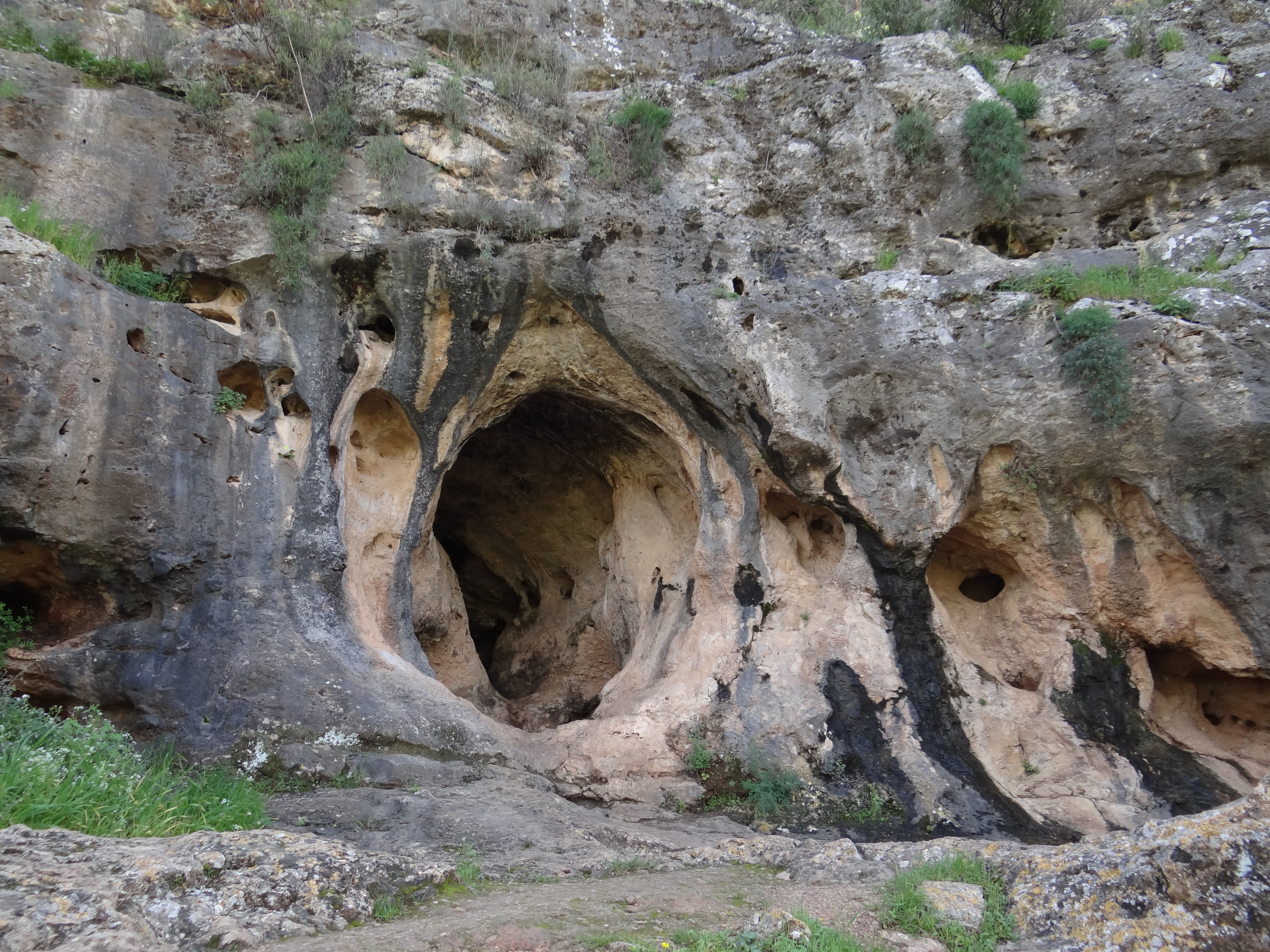

- Location within Haifa region of Israel
- 32°40′14.4″N 34°57′58.1″E
- Periods: Middle Paleolithic
- Cultures: Mousterian
- Location: Mount Carmel, Israel
- Part of: Nahal Me'arot Nature Reserve

Site notes
- Excavation dates: 1928
- Archaeologists: Dorothy Garrod

Skhul Cave (Levantine Arabic: مَغَارَة السخول, romanized: mġaret es-Skhūl, lit. 'Young Goat Cave') or Me'arat HaGedi (Hebrew: מערת הגדי) is a prehistoric archaeological site situated about 20 kilometres (12.4 miles) south of the city of Haifa, Israel, and about 3 km (1.9 mi) from the Mediterranean Sea.

Together with the nearby caves of Tabun, Jamal, and El Wad, Skhul Cave is part of the Nahal Me'arot Nature Reserve, a national park and UNESCO World Heritage Site.

== Findings ==
The site was first excavated by Dorothy Garrod during the summer of 1929. Several human skeletons discovered in the cave belong to an ancient population of Homo sapiens. Both Neanderthals and anatomically modern humans were present in the region from 200,000 to 45,000 years ago.

The remains found at es-Skhul, together with those found at the other caves of Wadi el-Mughara and Mugharet el-Zuttiyeh, were classified in 1939 by Arthur Keith and Theodore D. McCown as Palaeoanthropus palestinensis, a descendant of Homo heidelbergensis. According to a paper published in August 2025 in the journal l'Anthropologie, a five year old child uncovered at this site was found to be a hybrid Homo sapiens-Neanderthal based on its skull morphology.

== See also ==
- List of caves#Israel
- List of fossil sites
- Prehistory of the Levant
- Qafzeh Cave
- Qesem cave
