= Tabun Cave =

Archaeological site in northern Israel

Tabun cave
- Tanur Cave
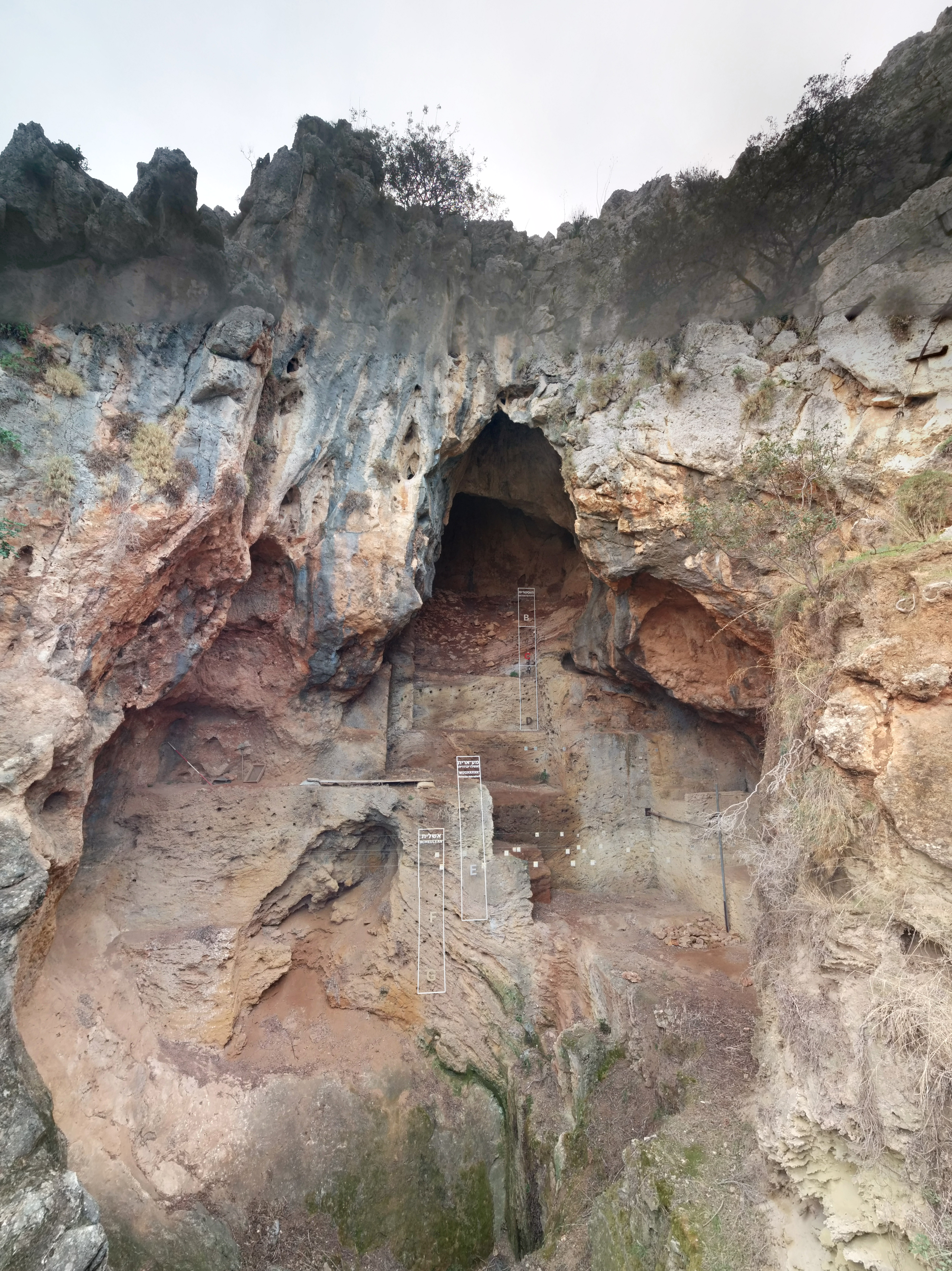

- Location within Haifa region of Israel
- 32°40′13.80″N 34°57′55.80″E
- Periods: Lower Paleolithic and Middle Paleolithic
- Cultures: Acheulean; Acheulo-Yabrudian complex; Mousterian
- Associated with: Neanderthal
- Location: Mount Carmel, Israel
- Region: Levant
- Part of: Nahal Me'arot Nature Reserve

Site notes
- Excavation dates: 1929, 1967
- Archaeologists: Arthur Jelinek

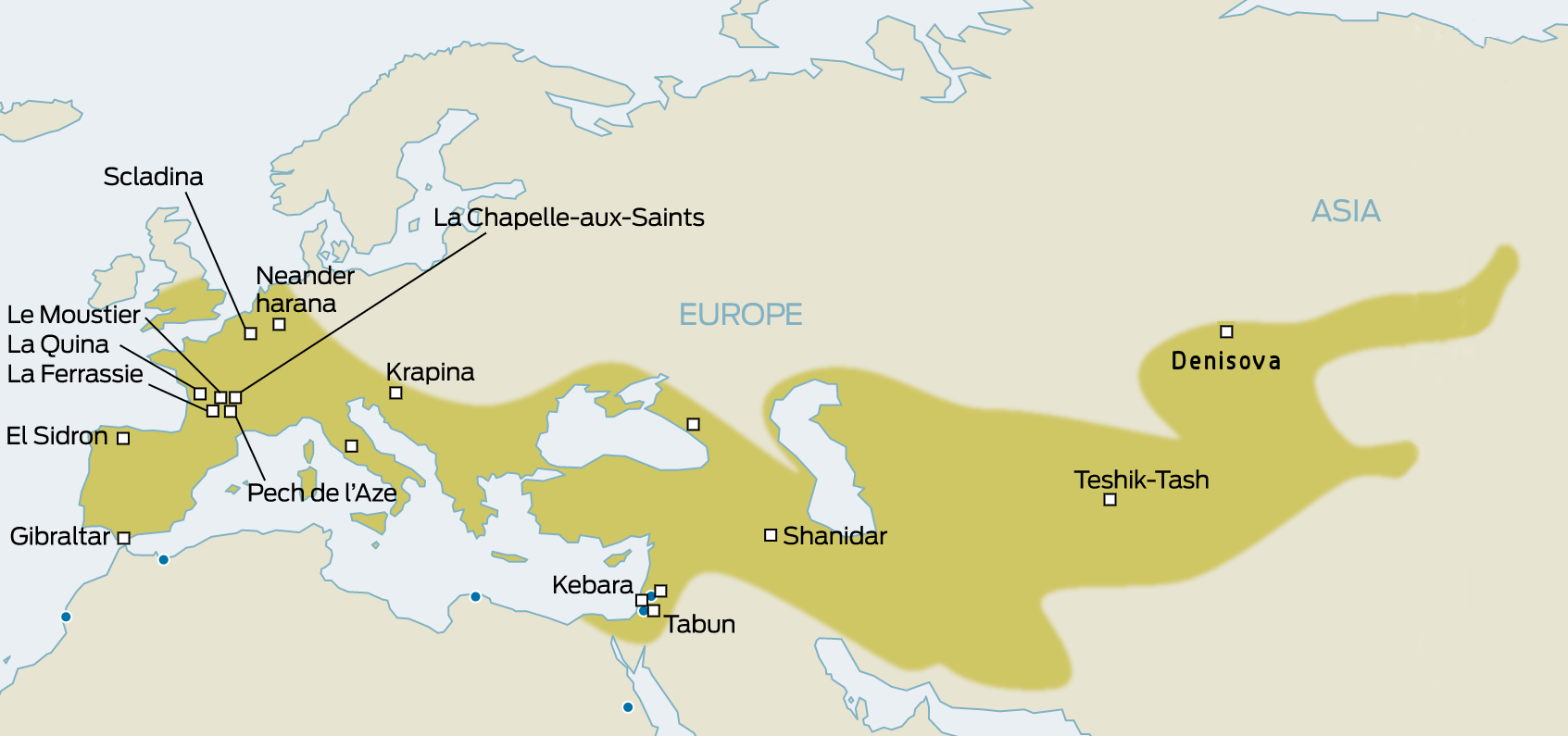
Distribution of the Neanderthal, and main sites, including Tabun cave.

The Tabun Cave (Arabic: مغارة الطابون, lit. 'The Oven Cave') or the Tanur Cave (Hebrew: מערת תנור) is an excavated site located at Nahal Me'arot Nature Reserve, Israel and is one of the Human Evolution sites at Mount Carmel, which were proclaimed as having universal value by UNESCO in 2012.

== History ==
Together with the nearby sites of El Wad, Jamal Cave, and Skhul Cave, Tabun is part of the Nahal Me'arot Nature Reserve, a national park and UNESCO World Heritage Site.

The cave was occupied intermittently during the Lower and Middle Paleolithic (500,000 to around 40,000 years ago). In the course of this period, deposits of sand, silt and clay of up to 25 m (82 ft) accumulated in the cave. Excavations suggest that it features one of the longest sequences of human occupation in the Levant. Dorothy Garrod led excavations in 1929 over 22 months that established the sequence of occupation of this and other sites in the area. It was during these excavations that a woman, Yusra, recruited from a local village, was credited with the discovery of the Tabun 1 Neanderthal skull.

== Deposits ==
The earliest and lowest deposits in the cave contain large amounts of sea sand. This, and pollen traces found, suggests a relatively warm climate at the time. The melting glaciers which covered large parts of the globe caused the sea level to rise and the Mediterranean coastline to recede. The Coastal Plain was then narrower than it is today, and was covered with savannah vegetation. The cave dwellers of that time used handaxes of flint or limestone for killing animals (gazelle, hippopotamus, rhinoceros and wild cattle which roamed the Coastal Plain) and for digging out plant roots. As tools improved slowly over time, the hand axes became smaller and better shaped, and scrapers made of thick flakes chipped off flint cores were probably used for scraping meat off bones and for processing animal skins.

The upper levels in the Tabun cave consist mainly of clay and silt, indicating that a colder, more humid climate prevailed as glaciers formed once more; this change yielded a wider coastal strip, covered by dense forests and swamps. The material remains from the upper strata of the cave are of the Mousterian culture (about 200,000 - 45,000 years ago). Small flint tools made of thin flakes predominate these levels, many produced using the Levallois technique. Tools typical of the Mousterian culture feature elongated points, and include flakes of various shapes used as scrapers, end scrapers and other denticulate tools used for cutting and sawing.

Arthur Jelinek's 1967 to 1972 excavations of the cave yielded over 1,900 complete and partial bifaces. The bulk of the biface assemblage can be attributed to the Late Acheulian and Yabrudian industries.

The large number of fallow deer bones found in the upper layers of the Tabun cave may be due to the chimney-like opening in the back of the cave which functioned as a natural trap. The animals may have been herded towards it, and fell into the cave where they were butchered.

Several fossils were discovered at Tabun cave, including a nearly complete female skeleton (Tabun C1) and a mandible (Tabun C2). The taxonomic attributions of the two fossils are still discussed.

Archaeologists also discovered 350,000-year-old cobble at the Tabun cave, which was used by hominids for abrading surfaces.

== Gallery ==
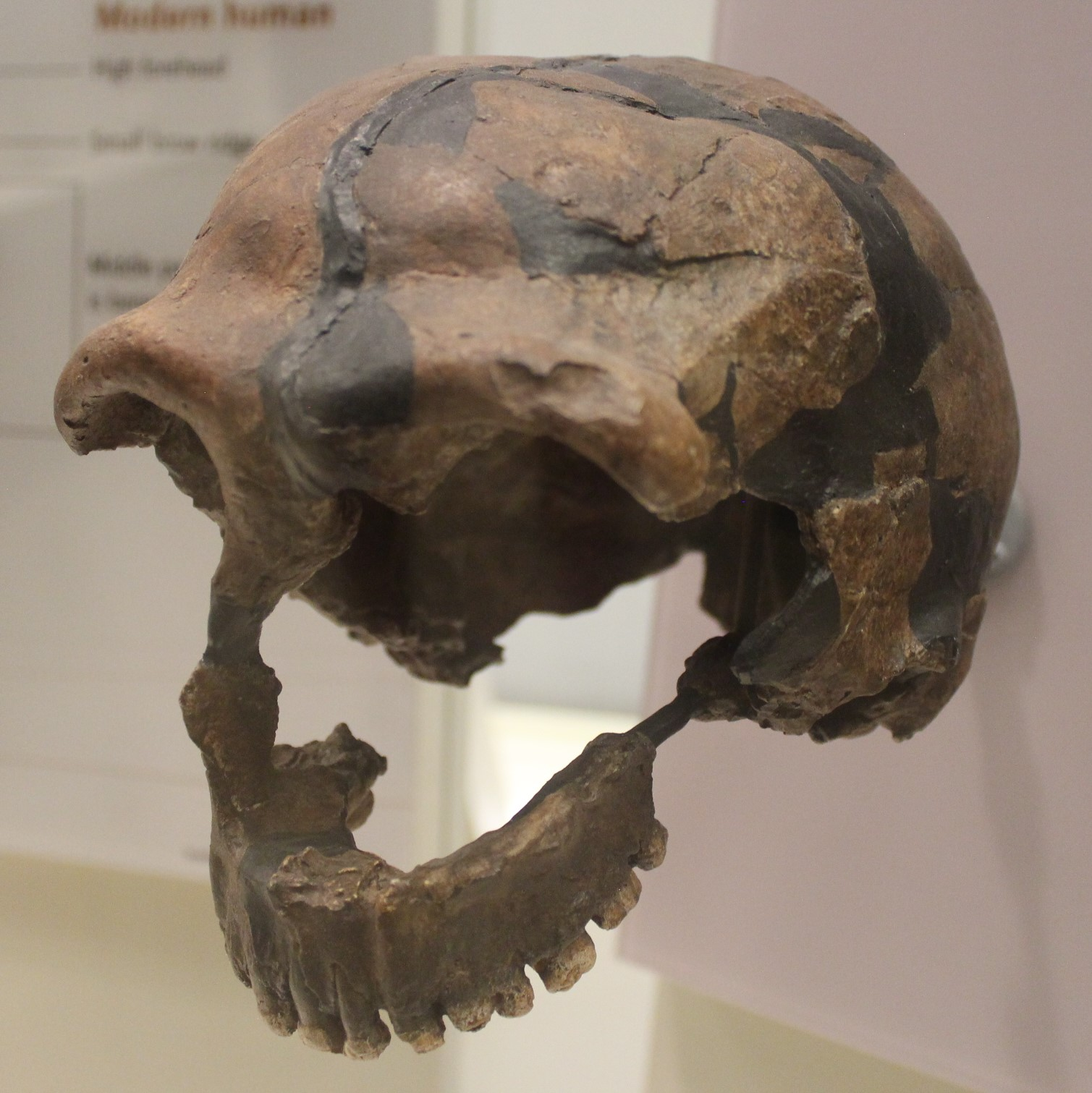
Replica of Tabun 1, National Museum of Natural History

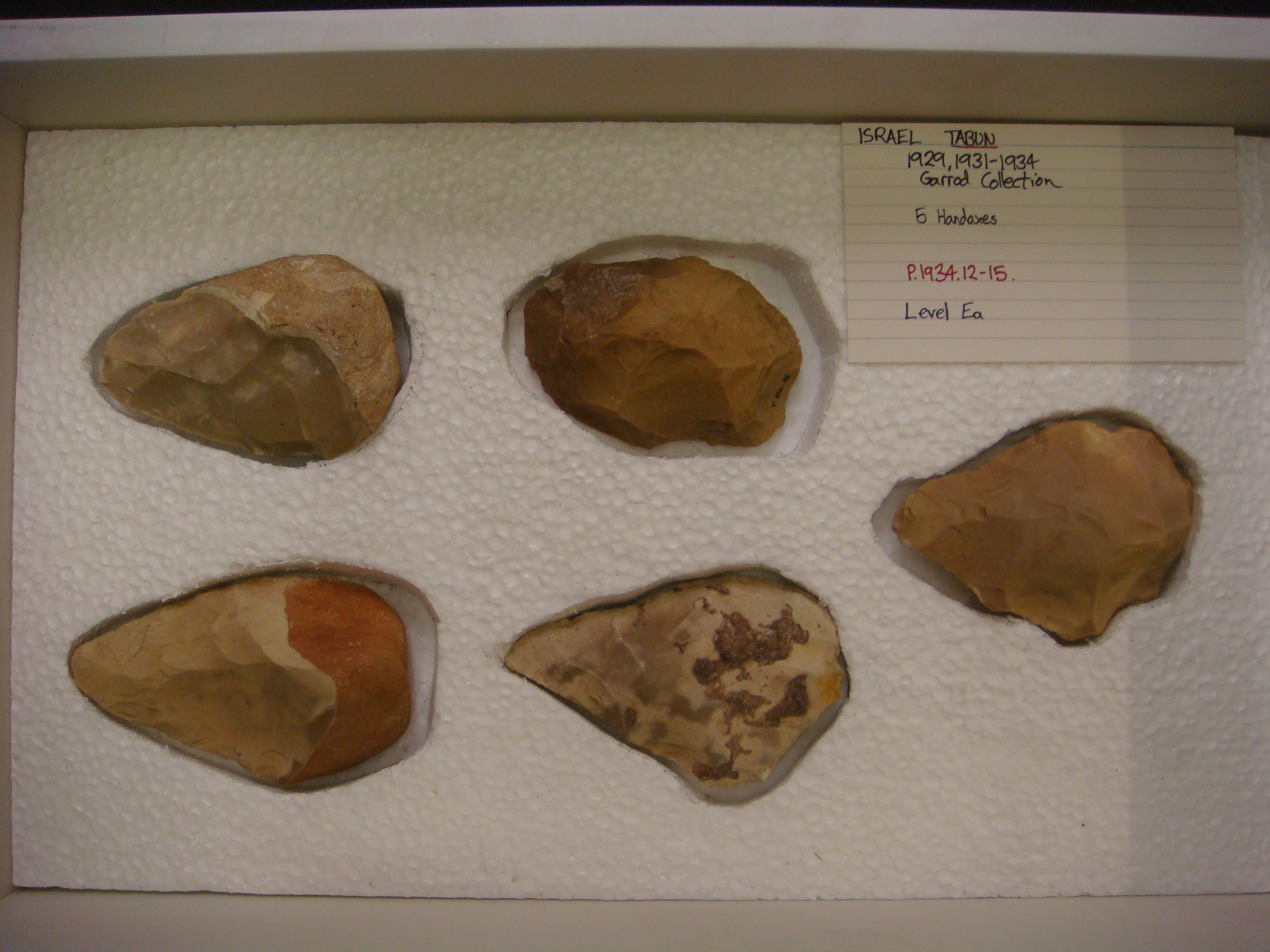
Five hand axes, excavated 1929-1934, British Museum

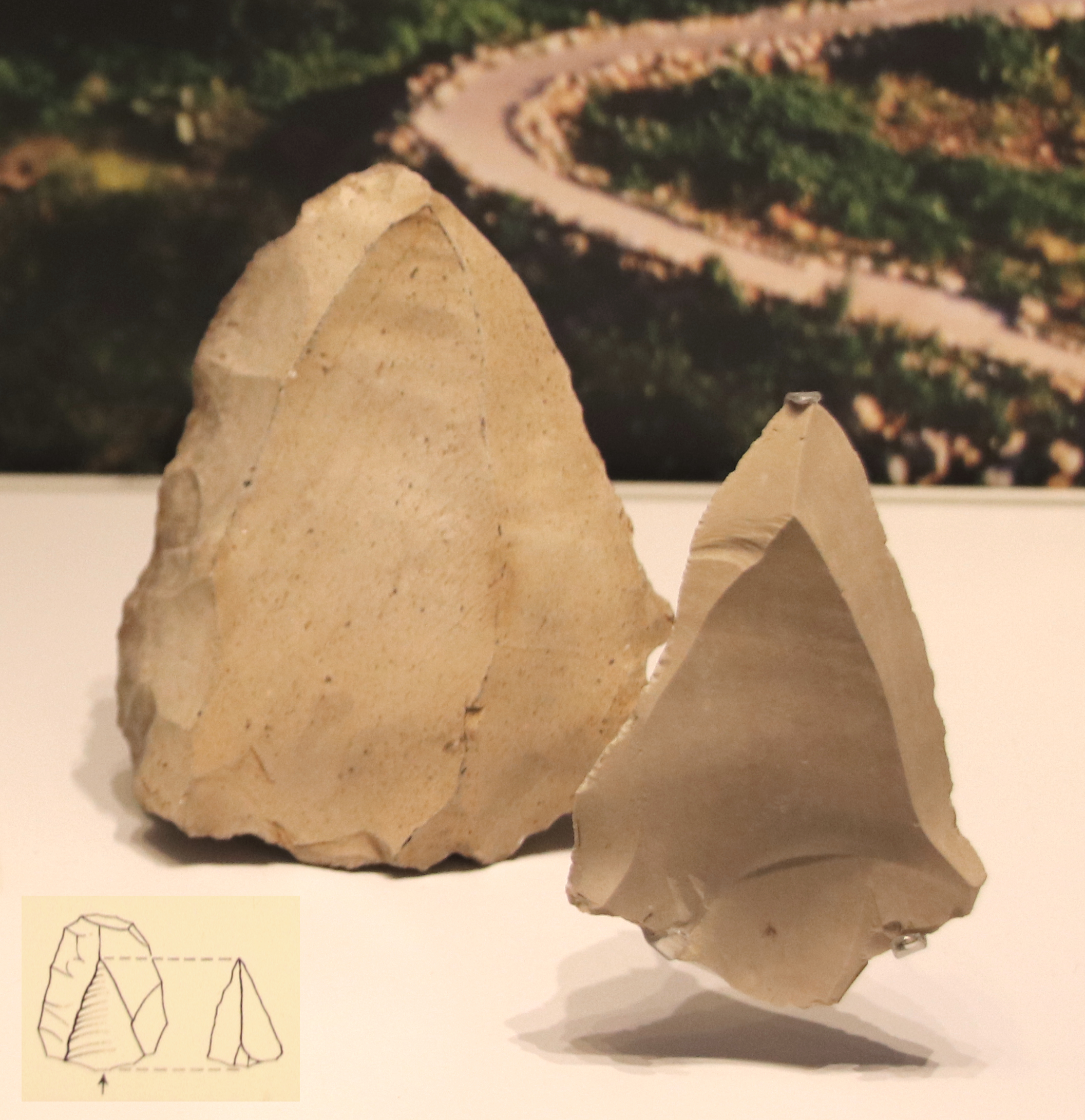
Production of points & spearheads from a flint stone core, Levallois technique, Mousterian culture, Tabun cave, 250,000–50,000 BP

== See also ==
- List of fossil sites
- List of hominina fossils
- Skhul Cave
- List of caves in Israel
