= Stone ball (disambiguation) =

A stone ball is a spherical man-made stone object.

Stone ball or stone sphere may also refer to:

== Natural ==
- Spherulite, a small, rounded body occurring in vitreous igneous rocks
- Cannonball concretion, a natural cementation found in North Dakota
- Cave pearl, concentric layers of calcium salts found in limestone caves
- Products of spheroidal weathering

== Artificial ==
- Stone spheres of Costa Rica, artefacts of unknown purpose from the Diquís culture
- Carved stone balls, artefacts of unknown purpose from prehistoric Scotland
- Various projectiles:
  - Round shot, a type of cannonball
  - Bolases, a throwing weapon

== See also ==
- Petrosphere (disambiguation)
