= Petrosphere =

Petrosphere (from Greek πέτρα (petra), "stone", and σφαῖρα (sphaira), "ball") may refer to:

- Stone balls, a diverse class of archaeological artefact
  - Particularly carved stone balls, prehistoric artefacts found in the British Isles
- Petrosphere (geology), a planet's crust and mantle
