= Stenkyrka =

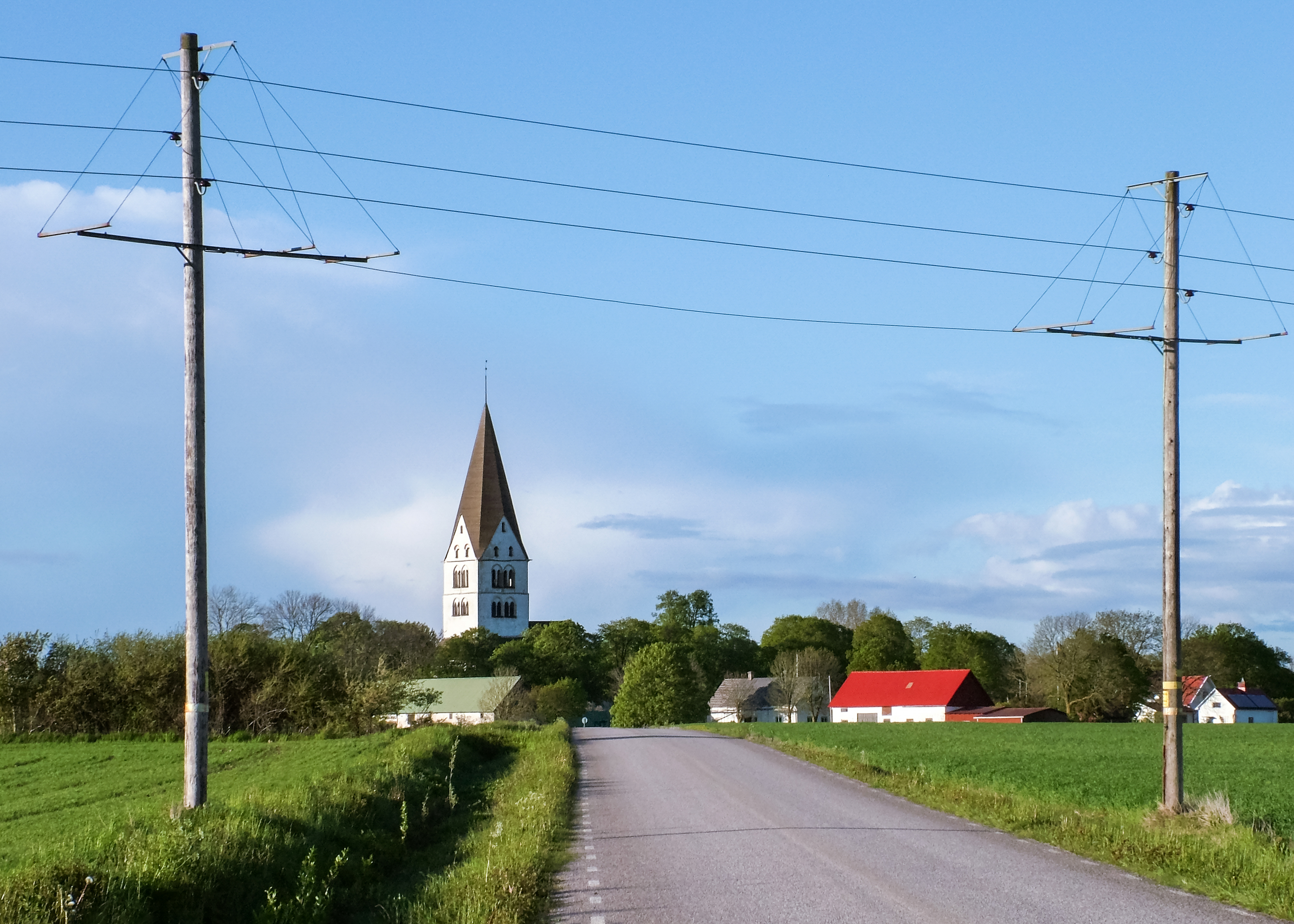
- The road from Martebo to Stenkyrka

- Location within Gotland
- Coordinates: 57°47′35.84″N 18°30′54.06″E
- Country: Sweden
- Province: Gotland
- County: Gotland County
- Municipality: Gotland Municipality

Area
  - Total: 43 km^{2} (17 sq mi)

Population (2014)
  - Total: 505
- Time zone: UTC+1 (CET)
  - Summer (DST): UTC+2 (CEST)

Stenkyrka is a populated area, a socken (not to be confused with parish), on the Swedish island of Gotland. It comprises the same area as the administrative Stenkyrka District, established on 1 January 2016.

== Geography ==
Stenkyrka in the northwest part of the island. The medieval Stenkyrka Church is situated in Stenkyrka. Near the church is a minor settlement with a few houses. The fishing village Lickershamn, noted for the stack Jungfrun is situated in Stenkyrka.

As of 2019, Stenkyrka Church belongs to Stenkyrka parish in Norra Gotlands pastorat, along with the churches in Martebo, Tingstäde and Lummelunda.

One of the asteroids in the Asteroid belt, 10125 Stenkyrka, is named after this place.

== History ==
This settlement is where the Stenkyrka spearhead was found. It is incised with the oldest known runic inscription known in Sweden.

=== Little Bjärs Grave Field ===
A bit east of the church in Stenkyrka is one of the largest grave fields on Gotland, the Little Bjärs Grave Field (Lilla Bjärs gravfält). Along one of the oldest roads in this part of the island, now not more than a trail, are more than 1,000 visible graves from the Stone Age and the Bronze Age. Most of the graves are cairns and circular tumuli. Bases for picture stones have been found in the field. They have remained after the picture stones have been moved and incorporated in the walls of the Stenkyrka Church. Some of these have later been moved to Gotland Museum.

The grave field is about 700 m × 500 m (2,300 ft × 1,600 ft) in a general northeast–southwest direction. It contains about 750 identifiable graves above ground, but it is difficult to ascertain the borders between the mounds. A number of the mounds have depressions in the middle, about ten have visible remains of cists made of limestone slabs, about 30 graves have grave orbs. Among the graves is also a stone ship. A large number of the graves have been damaged by modern constructions and farming. The modern road bisects the area in an angle to the old road that the field have been established around.

== Gallery ==
=== Stenkyrka ===
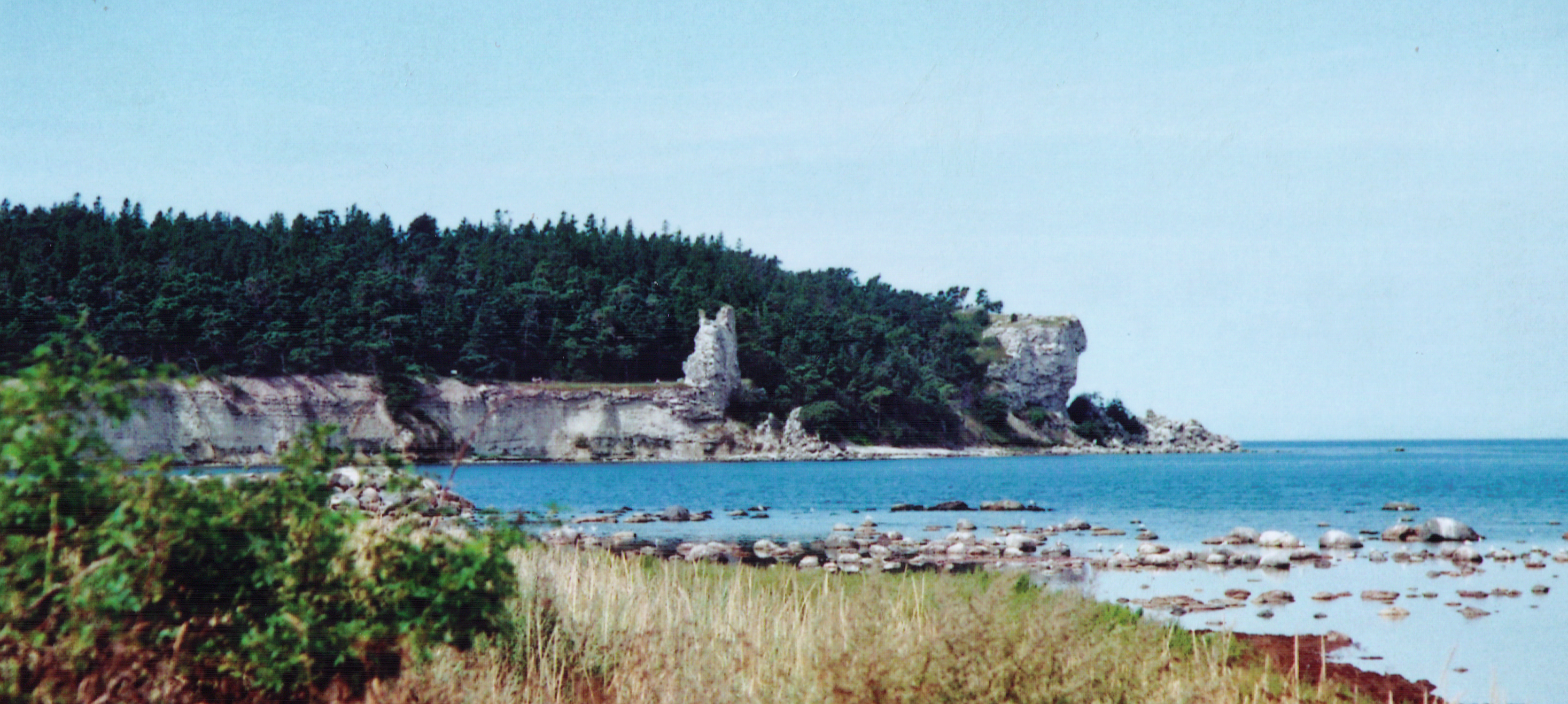
Rauks at Lickershamn, Stenkyrka.

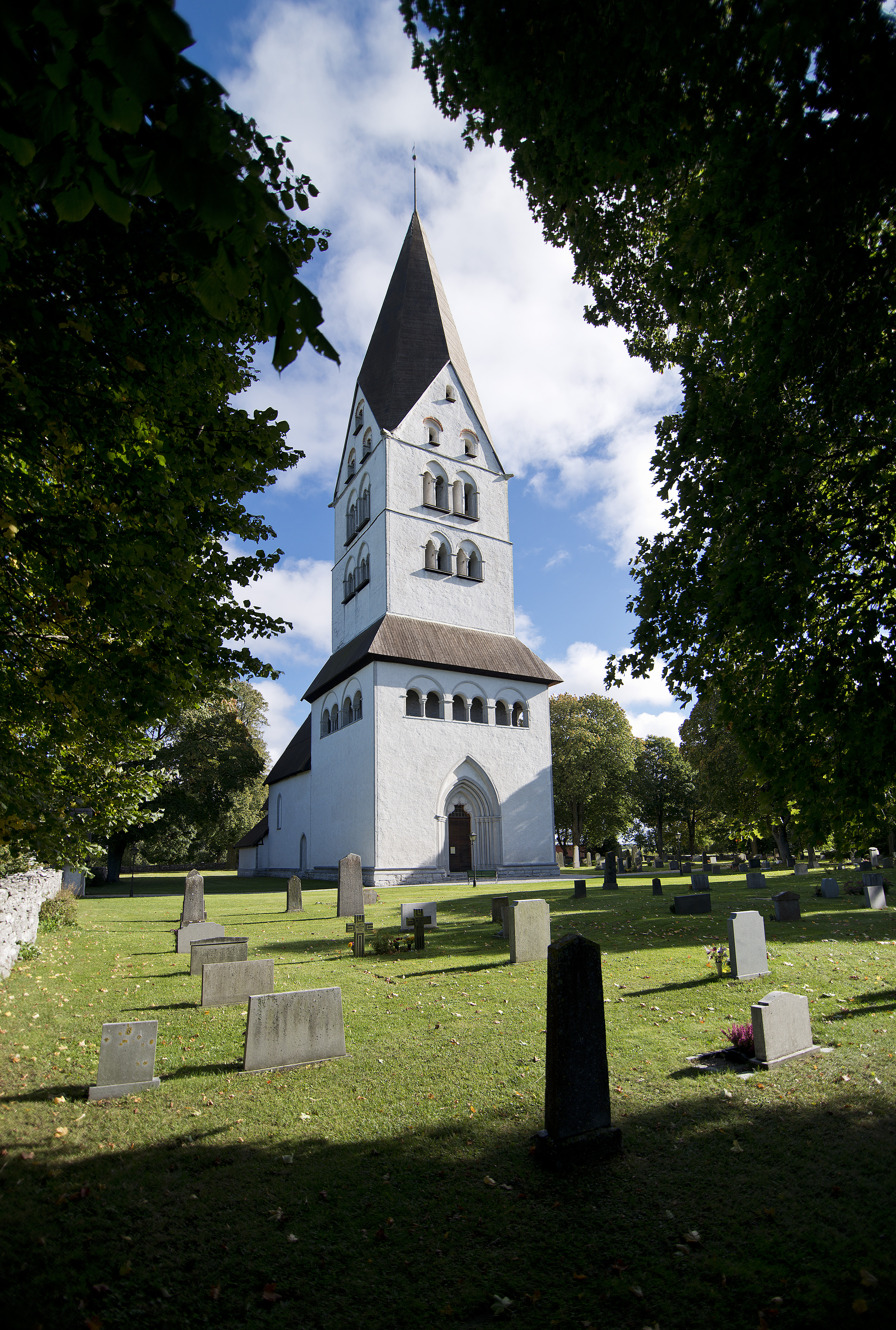
Stenkyrka church.

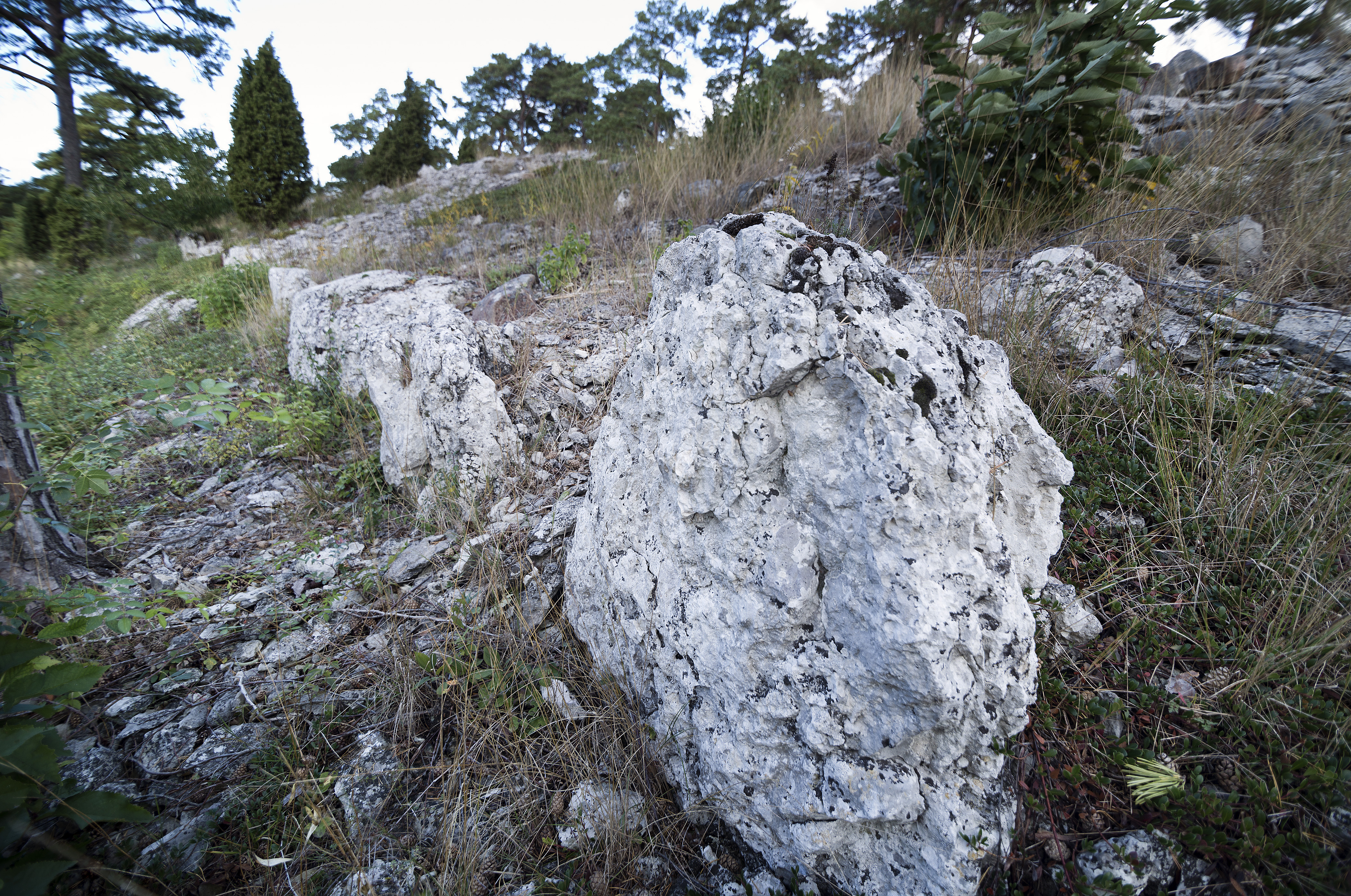
Ancient fortress at Lickershamn, Stenkyrka.

=== Little Bjärs Grave Field ===
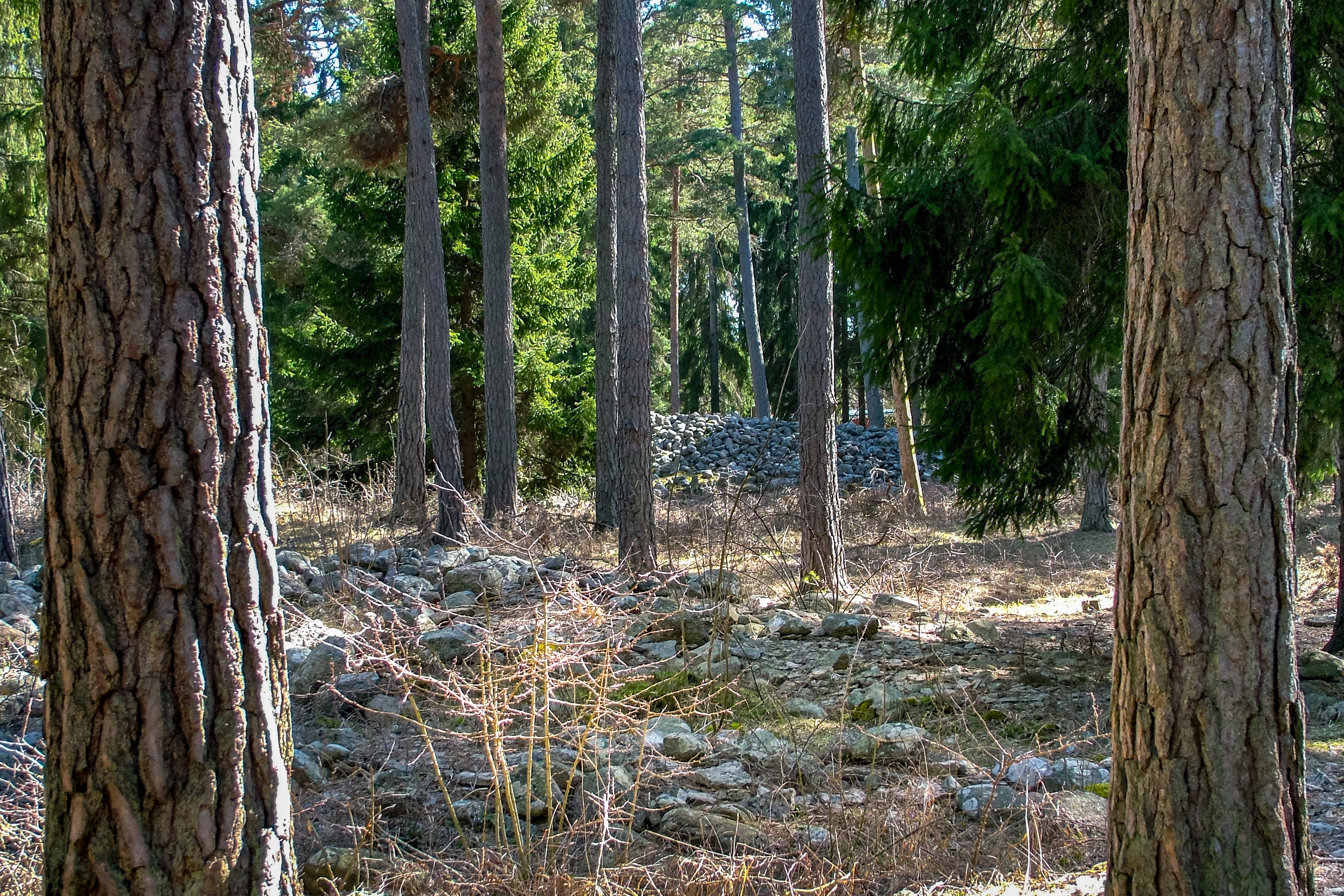
Two stone mounds

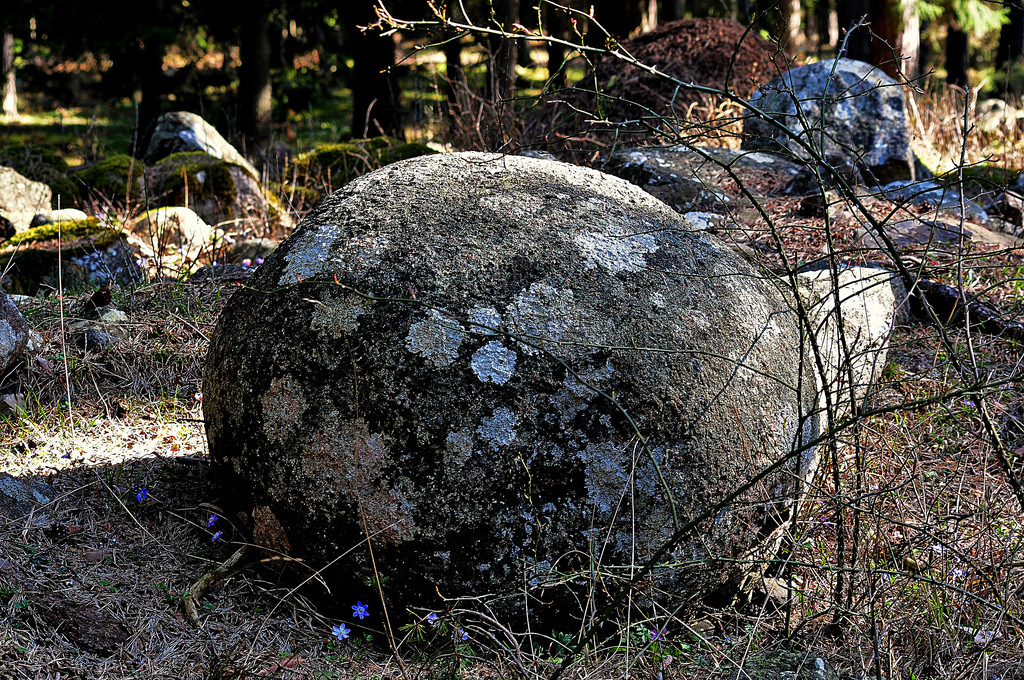
Grave orb

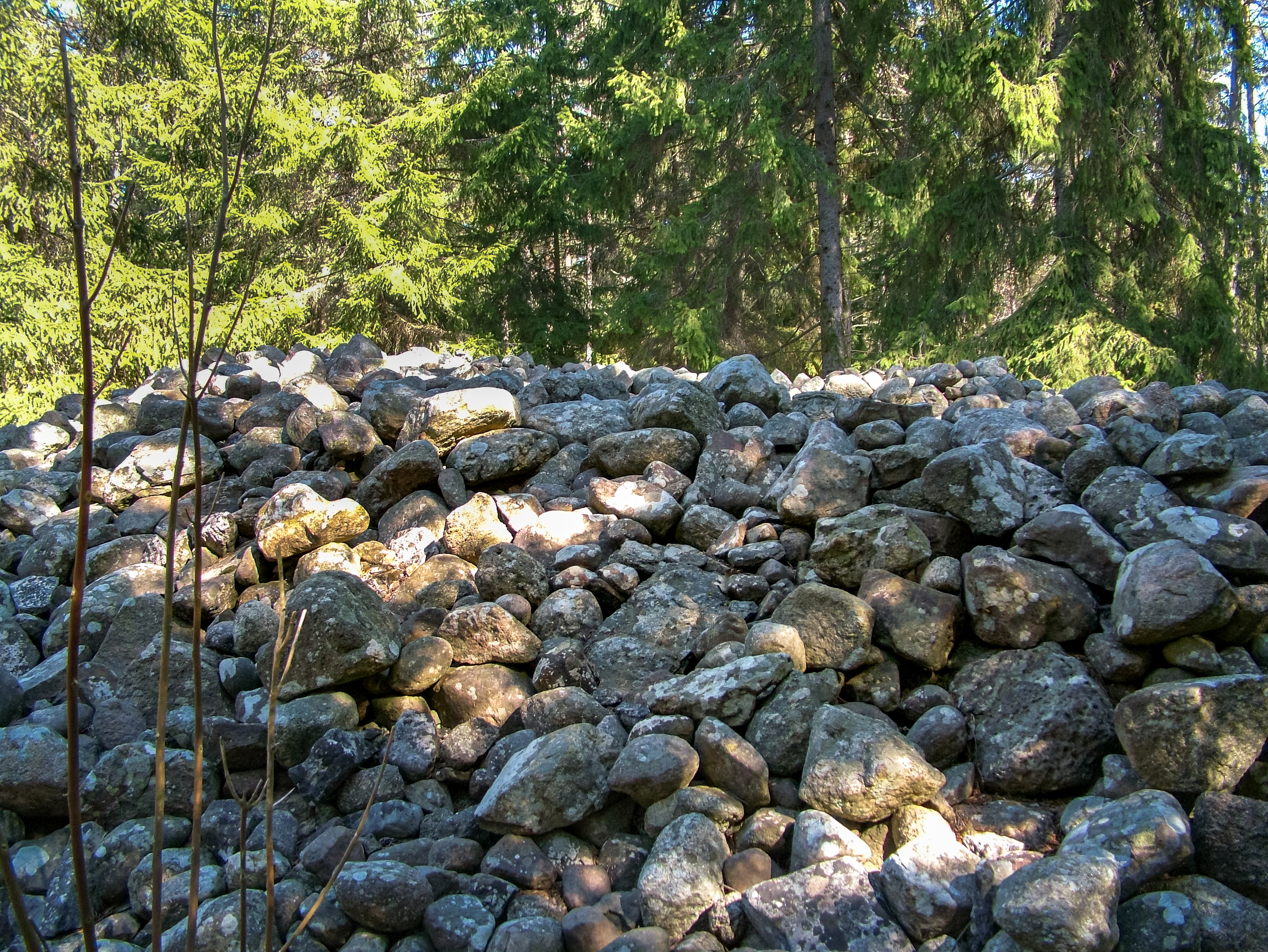
One of the larger graves
