= Lickershamn =

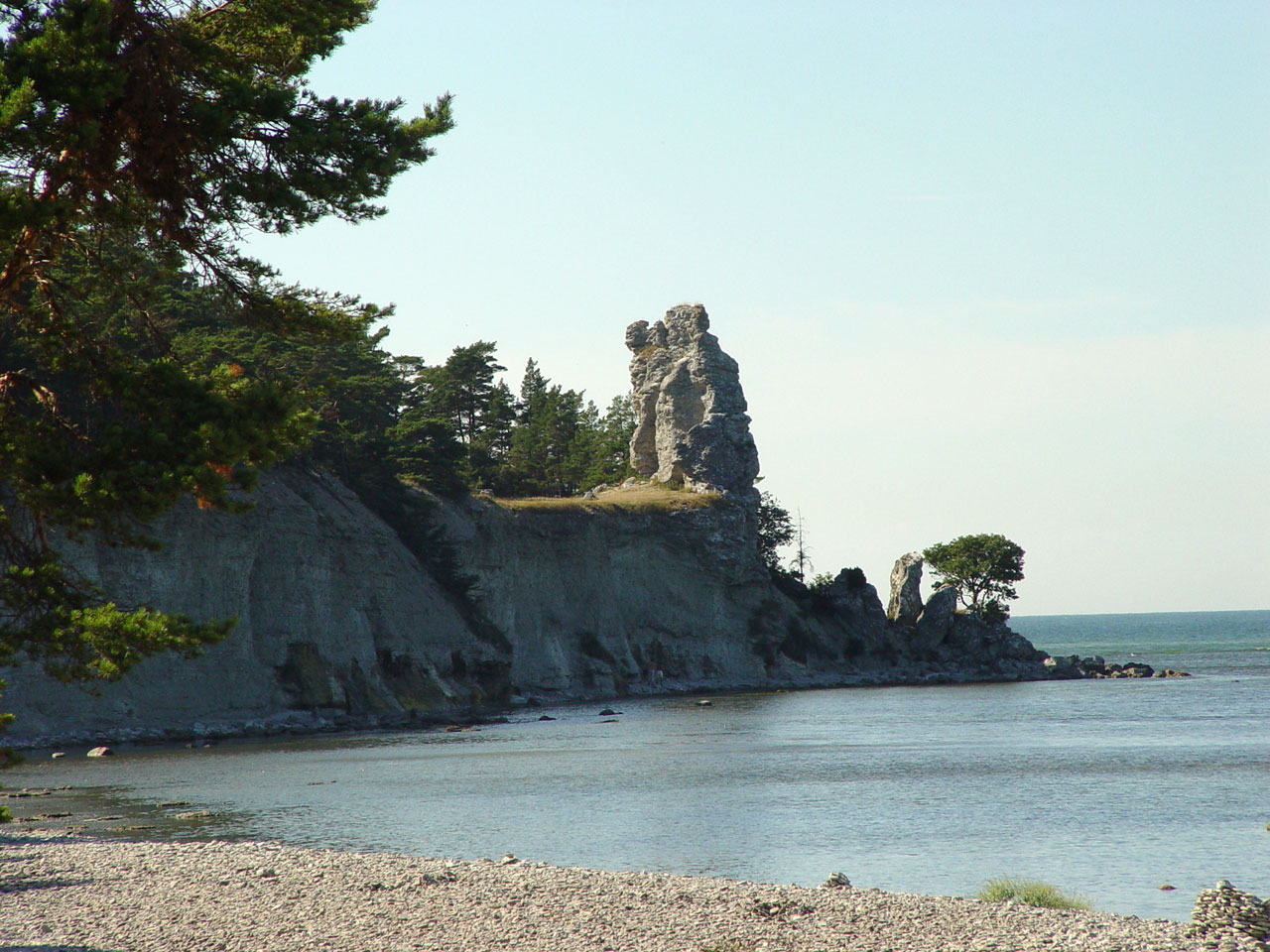
- The rauk Jungfrun in Lickershamn.

- Location within Gotland
- Coordinates: 57°49′33″N 18°30′53″E
- Country: Sweden
- Province: Gotland
- County: Gotland County
- Municipality: Gotland Municipality
- Time zone: UTC+1 (CET)
  - Summer (DST): UTC+2 (CEST)
- Website: www.lickershamn.com

Lickershamn is a small settlement and fishing village situated in Stenkyrka on the Swedish island of Gotland.

The place is most noted for the rauks in the area, including Gotland's largest rauk the Jungfrun ("The Maiden"). One of the asteroids in the asteroid belt, 10103 Jungfrun, is named after it.

== Gallery ==
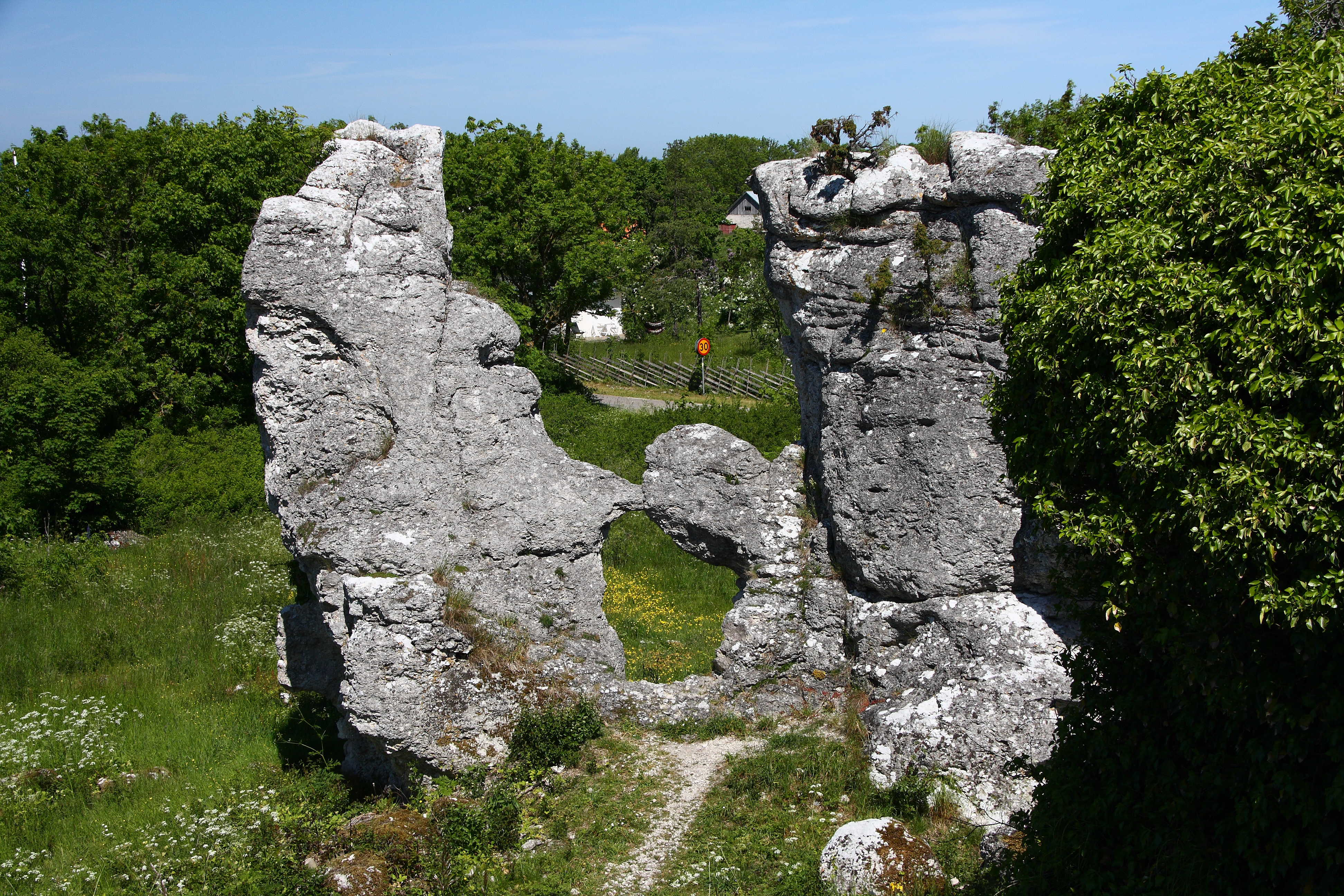
Grausne north rauk area at Lickershamn.

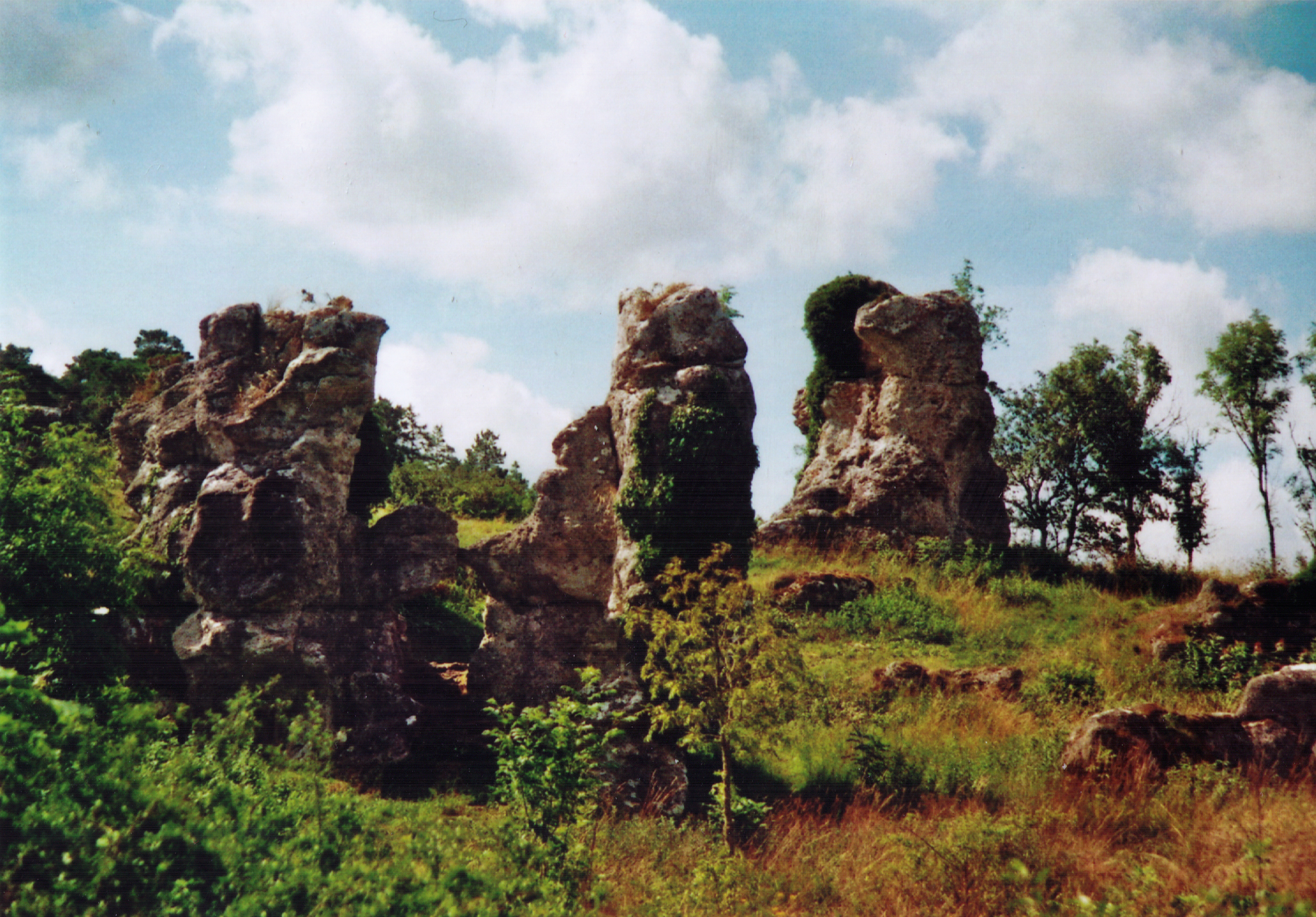
Grausne north rauk area at Lickershamn.

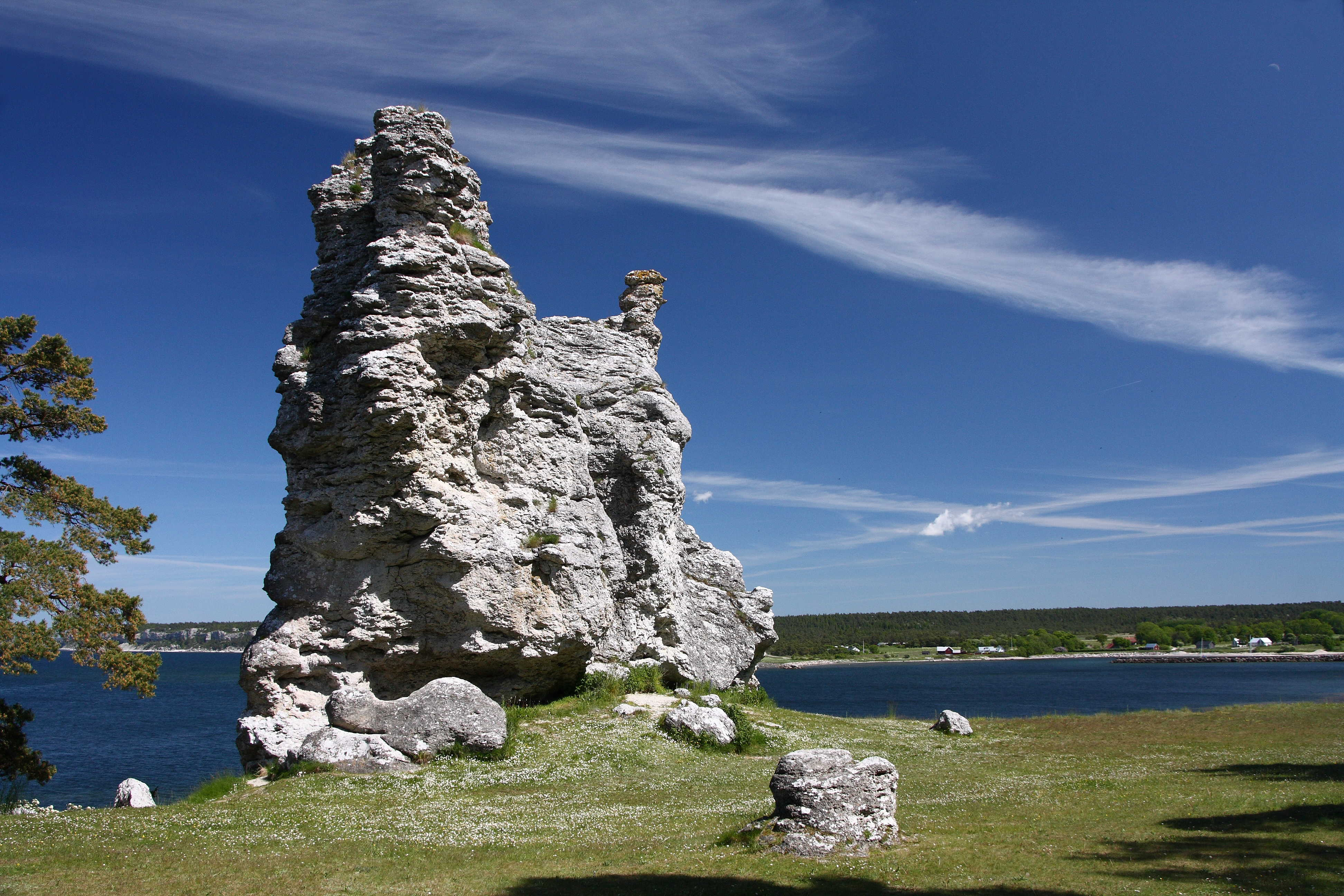
Jungfrun ("The Maiden"), rauk at Lickershamn.

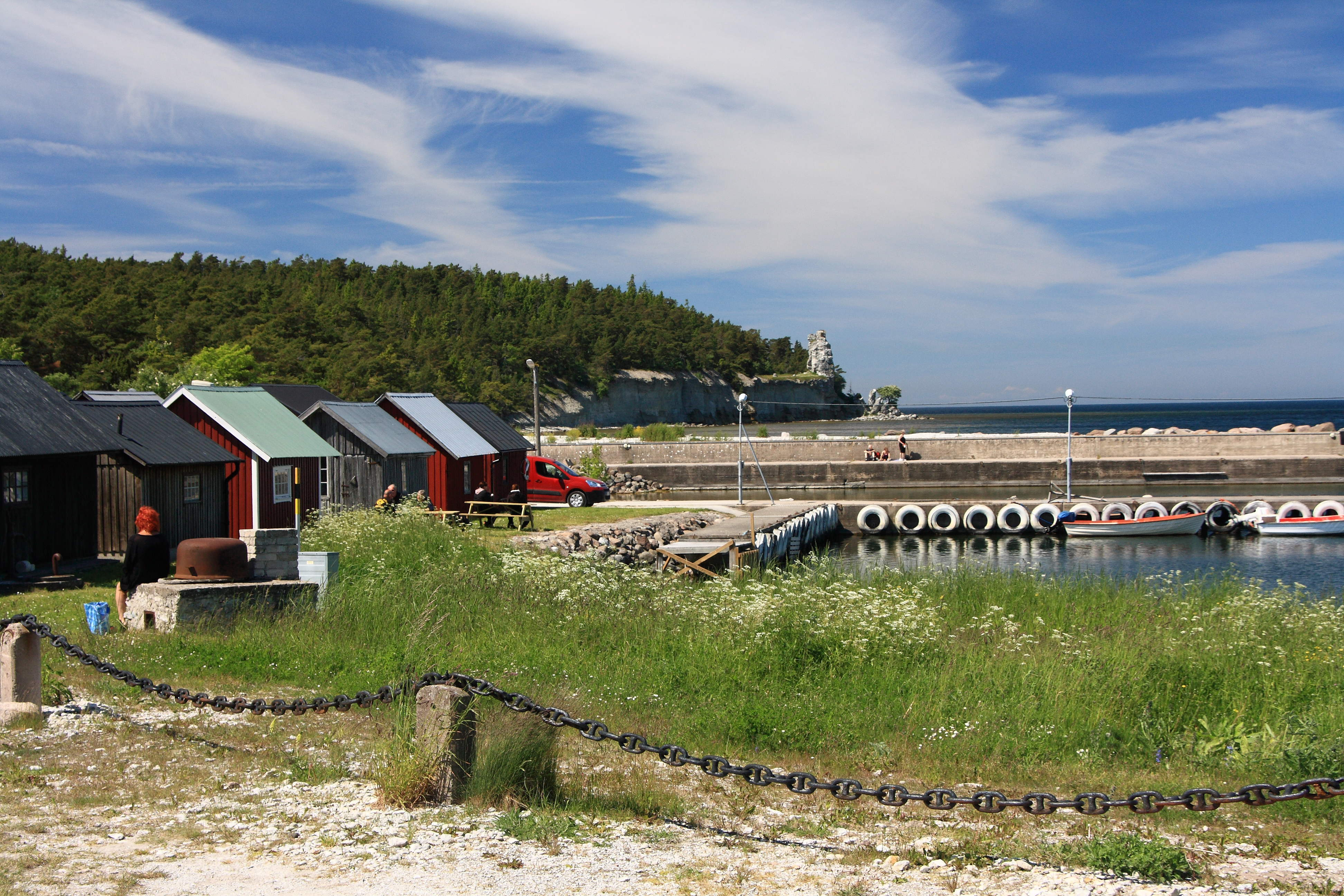
Lickershamn fishing village.
