= Grave orb =

Stone ball placed on a tomb

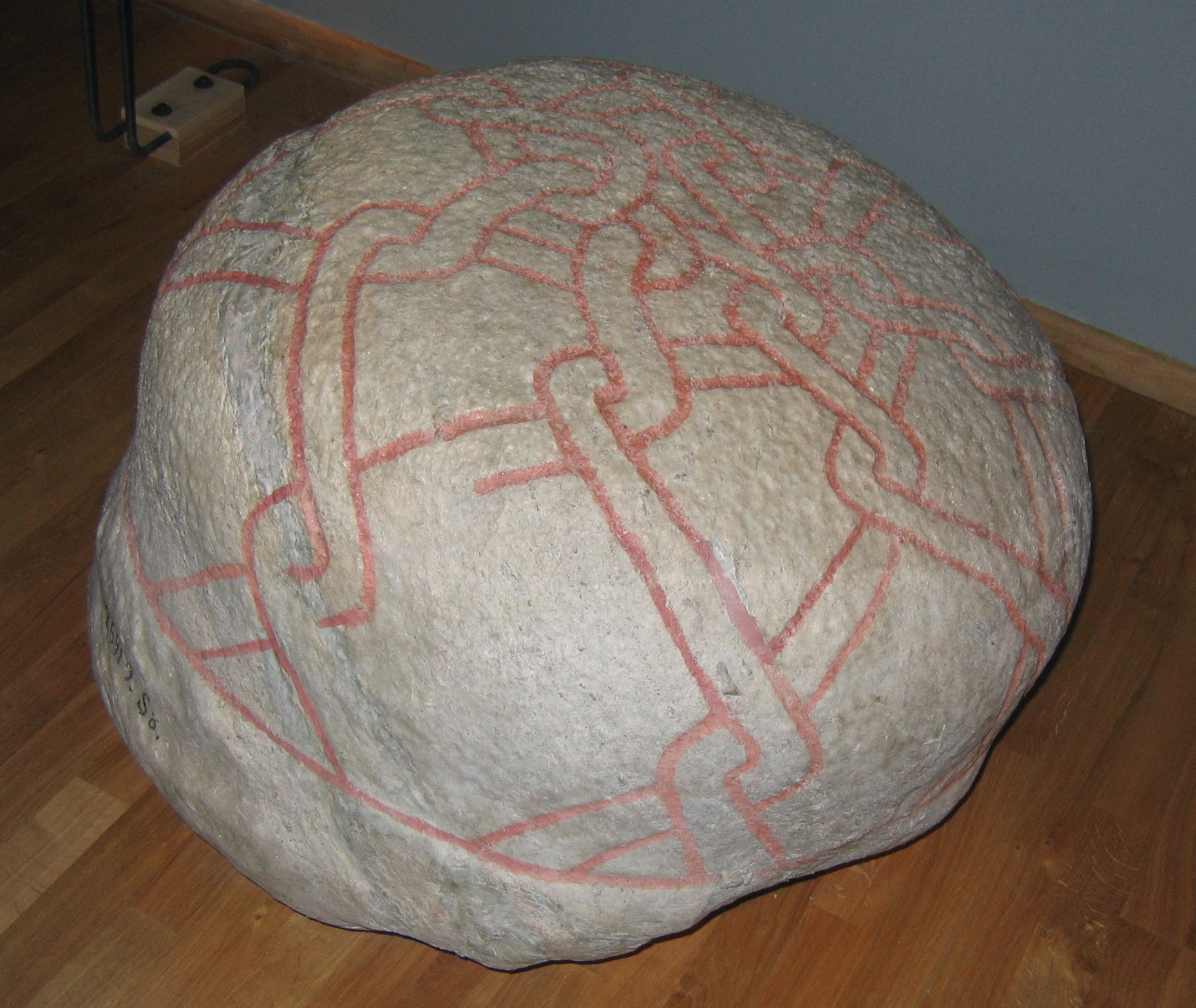
A grave orb in the Swedish Museum of National Antiquities in Stockholm

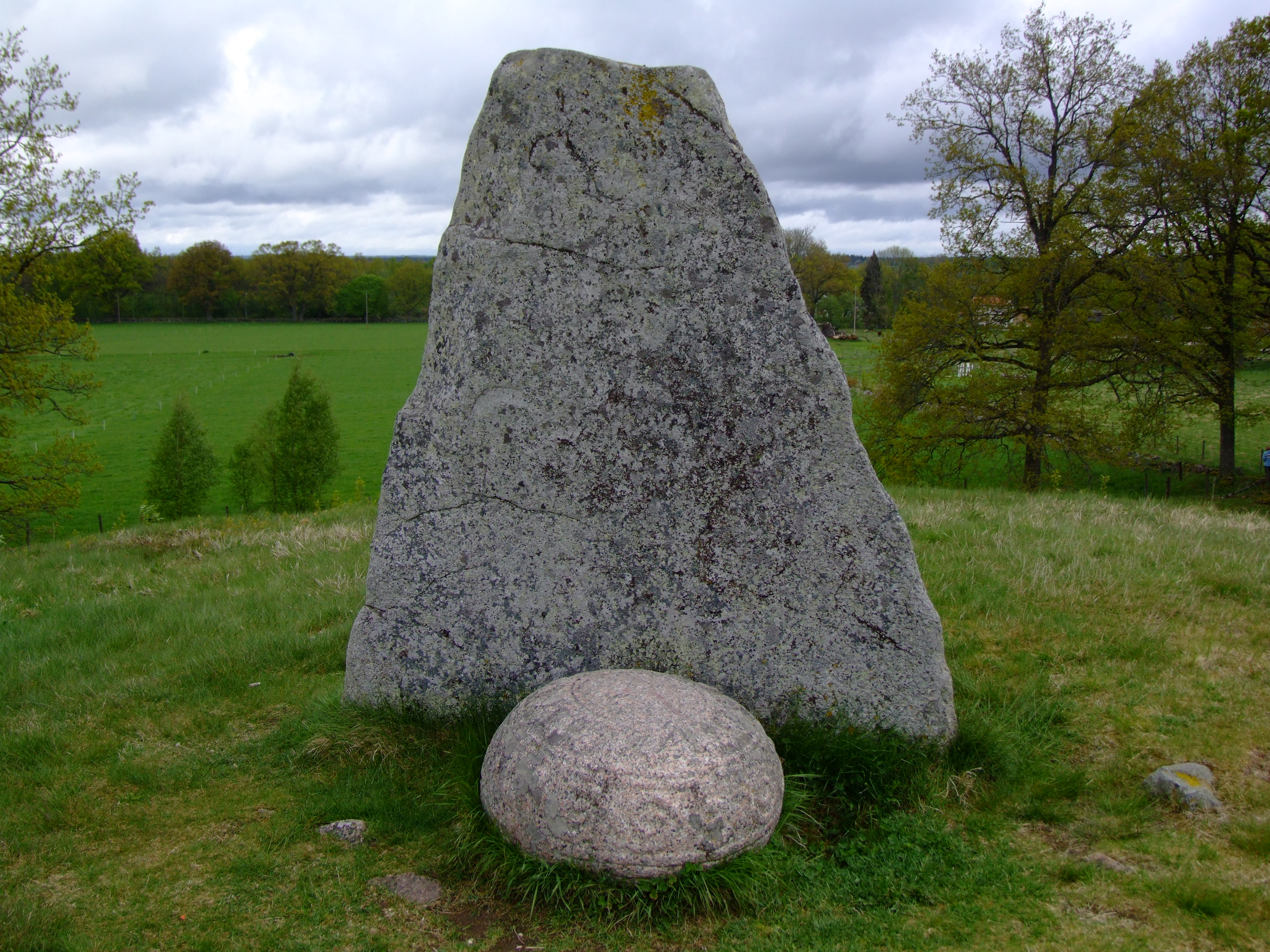
Inglinge Hög burial mound

A grave orb is a petrosphere that was put on a person's tomb. Grave orbs were made throughout Scandinavia from the Pre-Roman Iron Age until the Vendel era.

The grave orb could have been selected for its round shape or shaped by hand. They were then put in the centre of a burial site. Tumuli, stone circles and stone ships often have a reclining or raised central stone, and grave orbs derive from this practice. They were of ritual or symbolic significance.

Some grave orbs are engraved with ornaments, such as the orb at Inglinge hög or Barrow of Inglinge near Ingelstad in Småland, Sweden. Hög is from the Old Norse word haugr meaning mound or barrow.

== See also ==
- Stone spheres of Costa Rica – National symbol of Costa Rica
- Carved stone balls – Petrospheres from late Neolithic Scotland

== Sources ==
- The article 'Gravklot' in Nationalencyklopedin (1992).
