= Qesem Cave =

Archaeological site

- מערת קסם (Hebrew)
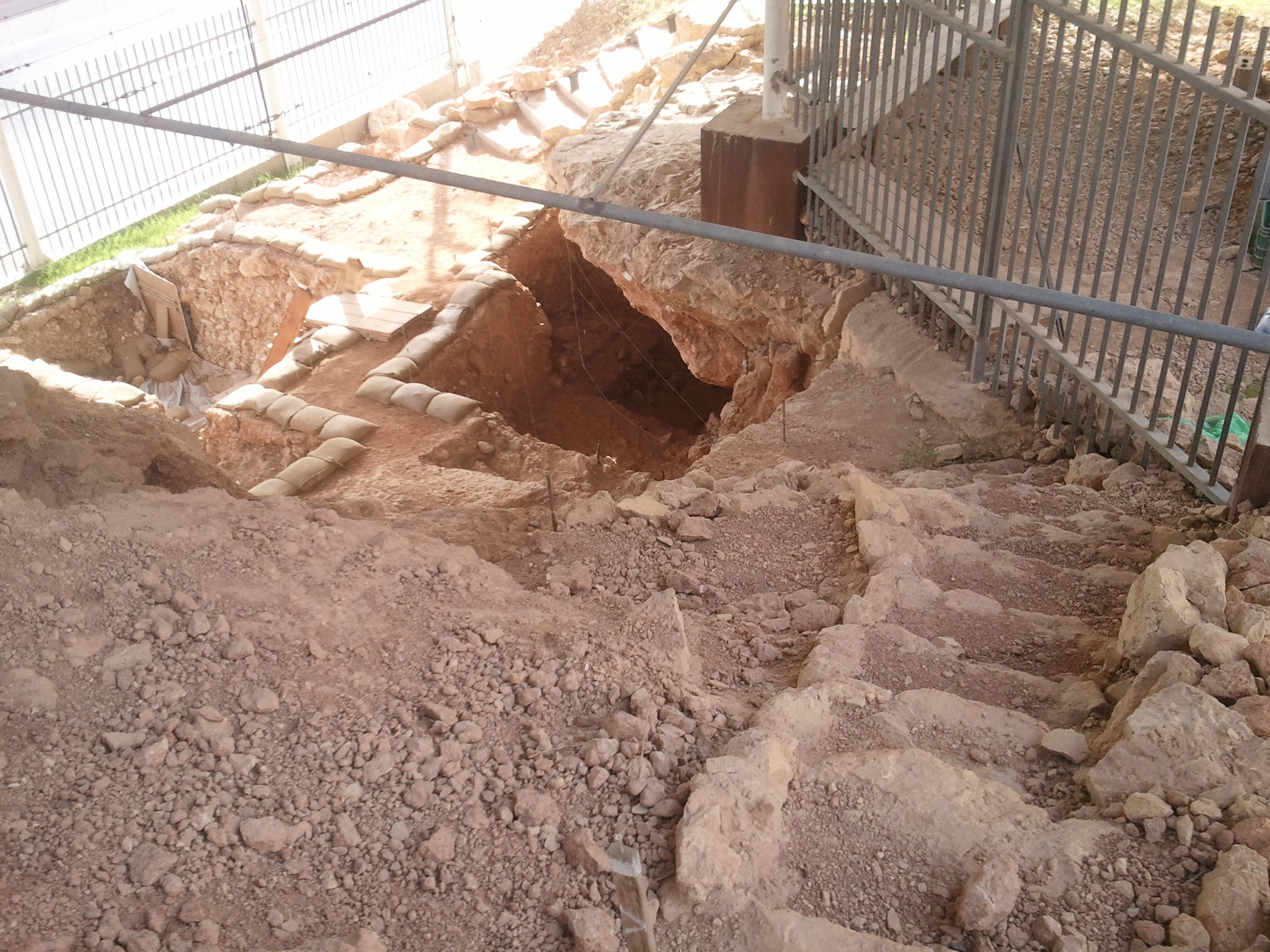

- Location within Central Israel
- 32.11°N 34.98°E
- Periods: Lower Paleolithic
- Cultures: Acheulo-Yabrudian complex
- Location: Central District, near the town of Kafr Qasim

Qesem Cave (Hebrew: מערת קסם) is a Lower Paleolithic archaeological site near the city of Kafr Qasim in Israel. The site was occupied by early humans from about 400,000 to about 200,000 years ago.

The karstic cave attracted considerable attention in December 2010, when reports suggested Israeli and Spanish archaeologists had found the earliest evidence yet of modern humans. Science bloggers pointed out that the media coverage had inaccurately reflected the scientific report.

Selective large-game hunting was regularly done followed by butchery of desired carcass parts for transport back to a residence for food sharing and cooking. The cave was found in October 2000 during road construction. Its deposits contain stone tools and animal remains from the Acheulo-Yabrudian complex.

== Description ==
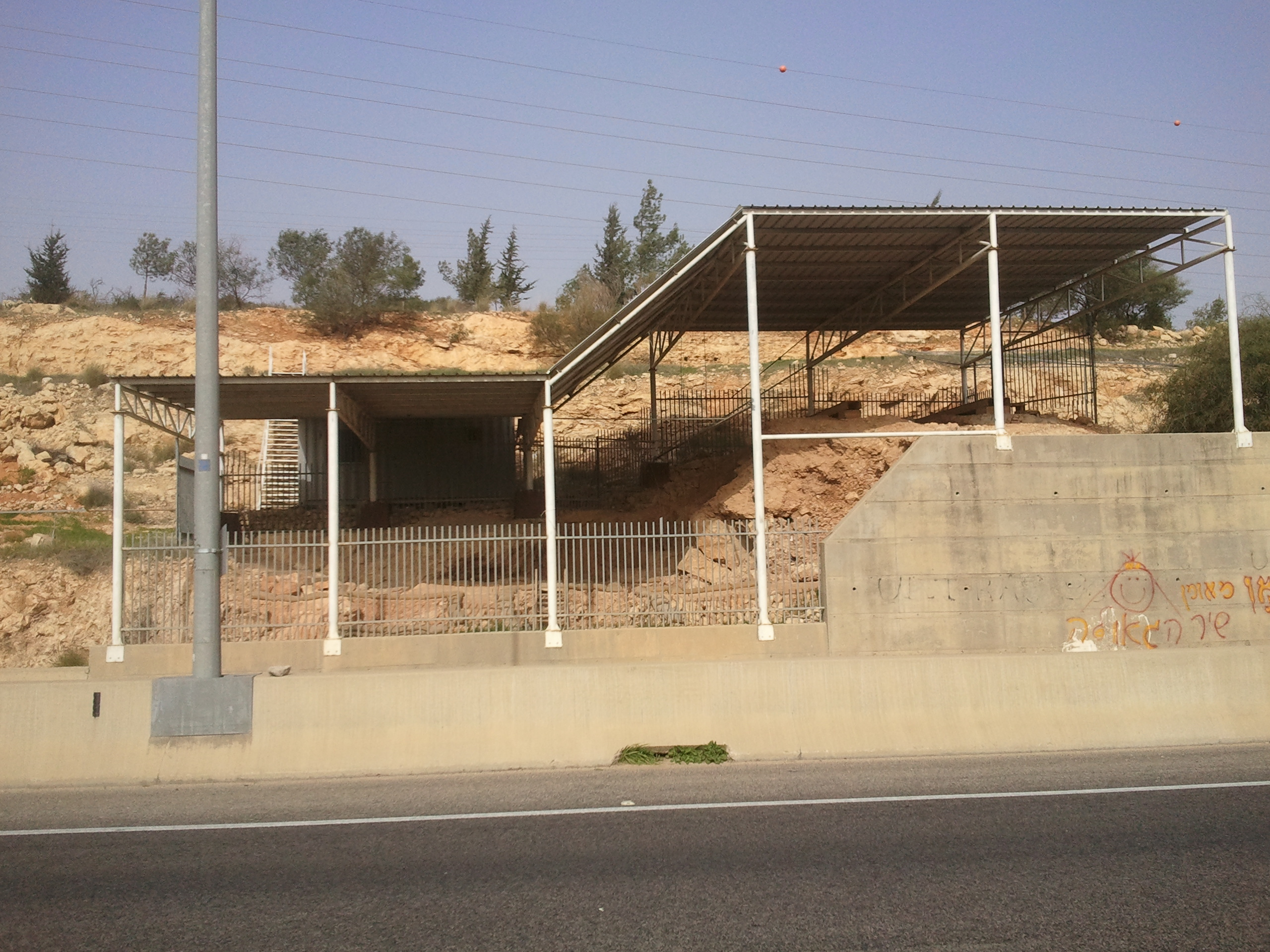
Qesem cave excavations, 2012

The cave exists in Turonian limestone in the western mountain ridge of Israel between the Samaria Hills and the Israeli coastal plain. It is 90 m above sea level and about 12 kilometers from the east coast of Mediterranean Sea.

Deposits at the site are 7.5 m (25 ft) deep, and are divided into two layers: the upper is about 4.5 m (15 ft) thick, and the lower 3 m (10 ft). The upper forms a step on the lower one. The deposits contain stone tools and animal remains from the Acheulo-Yabrudian complex. This a period that follows after the Acheulian but before the Mousterian. No traces of Mousterian occupation have been found.

The cave was found in October 2000 when road construction destroyed its ceiling. This led to two rescue excavations in 2001. At present the site is protected, covered and fenced and subject to on-going excavations.

== Dating ==
Qesem Cave was occupied from about 420–220 ka, although there is some uncertainty regarding the end date. All archaeological finds at Qesem Cave have been assigned to the Acheulo-Yabrudian Cultural Complex (AYCC) of the late Lower Paleolithic. In 2003, 230Th/234U dating on speleothems established the beginning of the occupation as "well before about 382,000 years ago." Further research in 2010, 2013, and 2016, involved thermoluminescence dating (TL) on burnt flints and ESR/U-series (Electron spin resonance dating) on speleothems and herbivorous teeth. As a result, the date for the start of the occupation has been revised to 420 ka. The date for the end of the occupation has been problematic, with an early estimate of "before 152,000," subsequently revised to "between 220 and 194 ka" but rounded to "ca. 200 ka"; more recently "closer to 220 ka than to 194 ka" and thus rounded to "220 ka."

== Artifacts ==
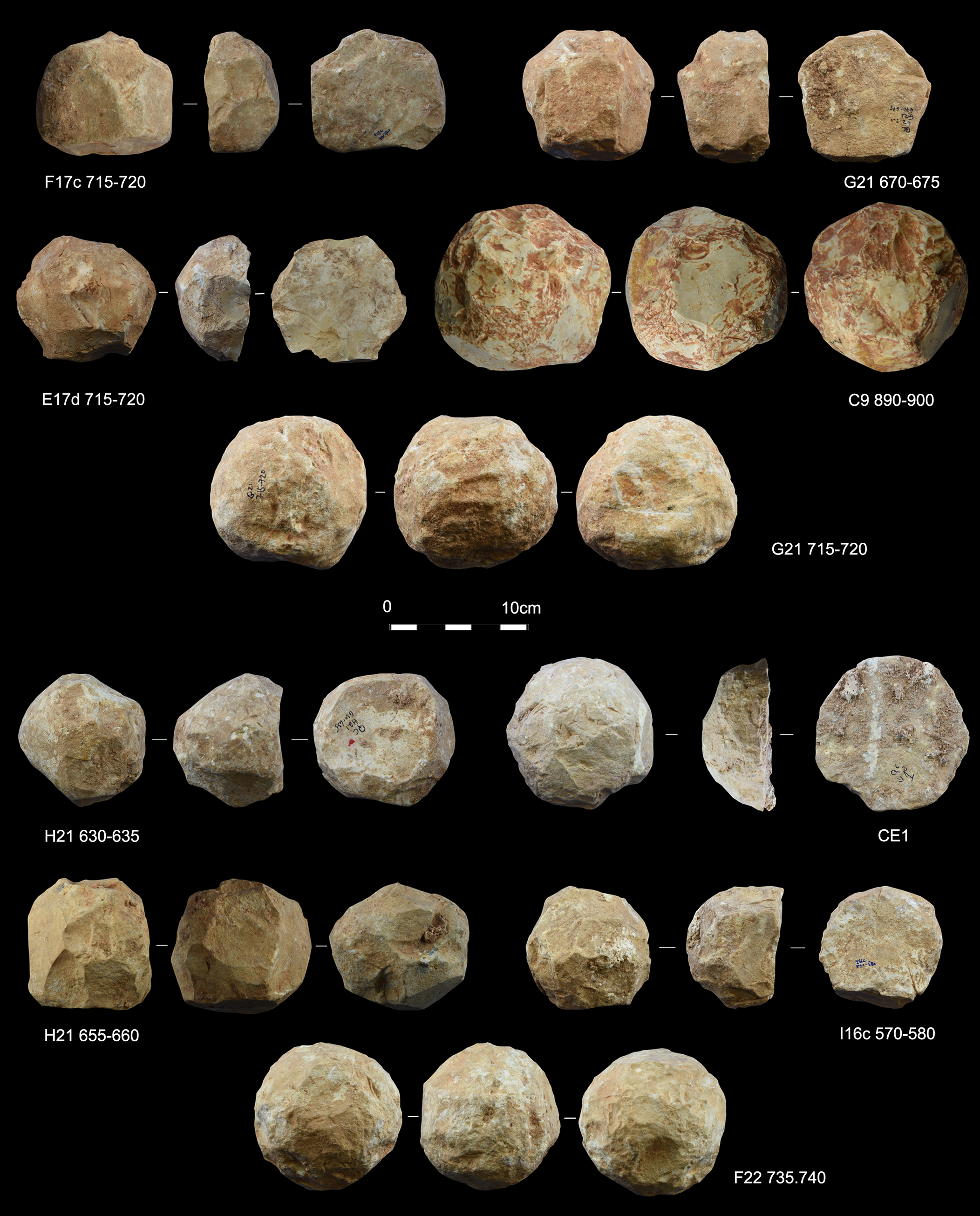
Shaped stone balls from Qesem Cave.

Qesem Cave stone tools are made of flint. They are mainly blades, end scrapers, burins, and naturally backed knives. There are also flakes and hammerstones. Some of the horizons contain many blades and related blade-tools but they are absent in others. However thick side-scrapers are found throughout them. Acheulian type hand-axes are found at the top and at the bottom of the archaeological sequence. All stages of stone tool manufacture have been found. Many of the cores have sufficient of the surface cortex to allow reconstruction of the original stone's shape. Stone tools of Qesem belong to 2 industries: Amudian (blades dominated) and Yabrudian (scraper dominated).

Using the concentration of cosmic ray created Beryllium-10 it has been argued that the flint used at Qesem Cave was surface-collected or only dug from shallow quarries. This is in contrast to flint of the same period from Tabun Cave nearby that originated two or more metres below the surface, probably after being mined.

A 2020 study led by researcher Ella Assaf from Tel Aviv University concluded that shaped stone balls discovered at Qesem cave were used to break the bones of large animals in order to extract the nutritious marrow inside.

== Fire ==
The Qesem Cave contains one of the earliest examples of regular use of fire in the Middle Pleistocene. Large quantities of burnt bone, defined by a combination of microscopic and macroscopic criteria, and moderately heated soil lumps suggest butchering and prey-defleshing occurred near fireplaces.

10–36% of identified bone specimens show signs of burning and on unidentified bone ones it could be up to 84%. Such heat reached 500 degrees C.

A 300,000-year-old hearth was unearthed in a central part of the cave. Layers of ash was discovered in the pit, and burnt animal bones and flint tools used for carving meat were found near the hearth, suggesting it was used repeatedly and was a focal point for the people living there.

"These were a very sophisticated, very clever people whose toolmaking was advanced, who hunted skillfully, could produce fire at will, and of course ate well, we believe it would have been a fairly small group of people staying here", said Tel Aviv University archaeologist Ran Barkai.

A 2020 study concluded that hominins living in Qesem cave managed to heat their flint to different temperatures before knapping it into different tools, for instance, blades were heated at 259 °C (498 °F) and flakes at 413 °C (775 °F) .

== Hunted prey ==
The faunal assemblages consist of 14 taxa. Bones from 4,740 prey animals have been identified. These are mostly large mammals such as fallow deer (Dama, large-bodied form, 73–76% of identified specimens), aurochs (Bos), horse (Equus, caballine type), wild pig (Sus), wild goat, roe deer, wild ass and red deer (Cervus). Tortoise (Testudo) and a rare rhinoceros remains have also been found but no gazelle bones.

These animal bones show marks of butchery, marrow extraction and burning from fire. Analysis of the orientation and anatomical placements of the cut marks suggest meat and connective tissue were cut off in a planned manner from the bone.

Deer remains are limited to limb bones and head parts without remains of vertebrae, ribs, pelvis, or feet suggesting that butchery was selective in regard to the body parts that had been carried to the cave following initial butchery of the animal carcasses elsewhere.

Moreover, the presence of fetal bones and the absence of deer antlers implies that much of the hunting took place in late winter through early summer. At that time the need for additional fat in the diet would have made those animals particularly important prey. The excavators described this as "prime-age-focused harvesting, a uniquely human predator–prey relationship".

== See also ==
- Archaeological sites in Israel
- Mugharet el-Zuttiyeh
- List of fossil sites
- Control of fire by early humans
- Skhul and Qafzeh hominins
