= Petrosphere (geology) =

In geology, the petrosphere is the entire silicate portion of a planet, including its crust and mantle.

== See also ==
- Lithosphere
