= Stone ball =

Spherical man-made artifact composed of stone

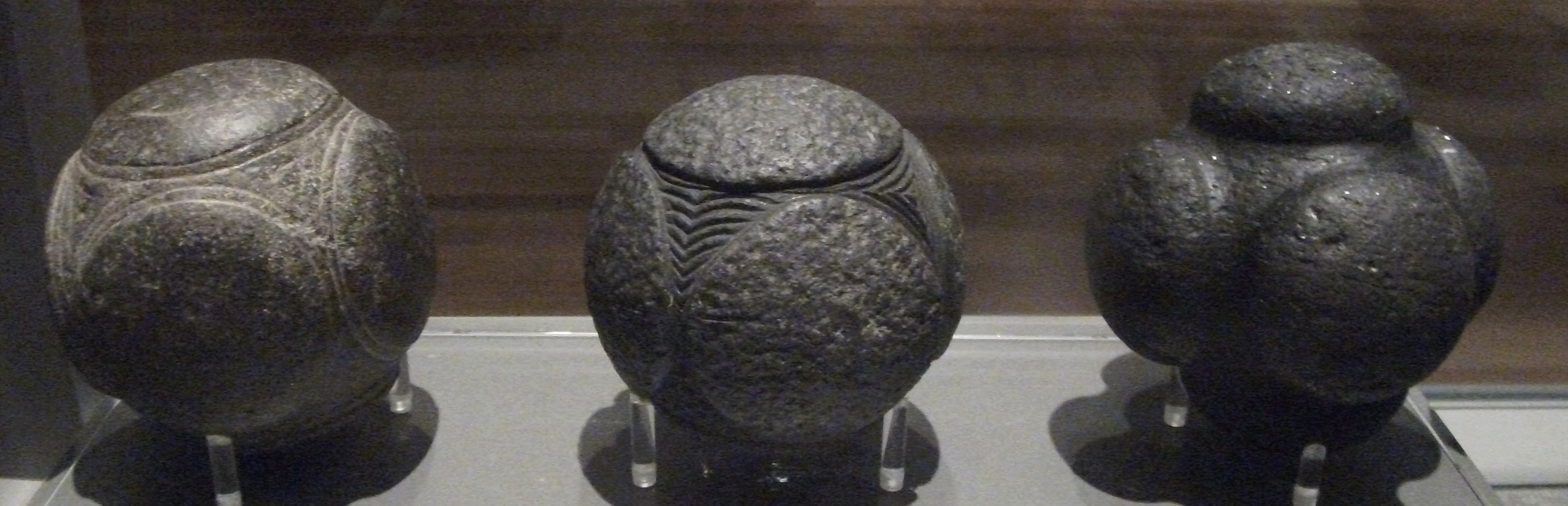
Three prehistoric Scottish carved stone balls, in Kelvingrove Art Gallery and Museum, Glasgow

In archaeology, a stone ball or petrosphere (from Greek πέτρα (petra), "stone", and σφαῖρα (sphaira), "ball") is the name for any spherical man-made object of any size that is composed of stone. These mainly prehistoric artifacts may have been created or selected, but altered in some way to perform their specific function, including carving and painting.

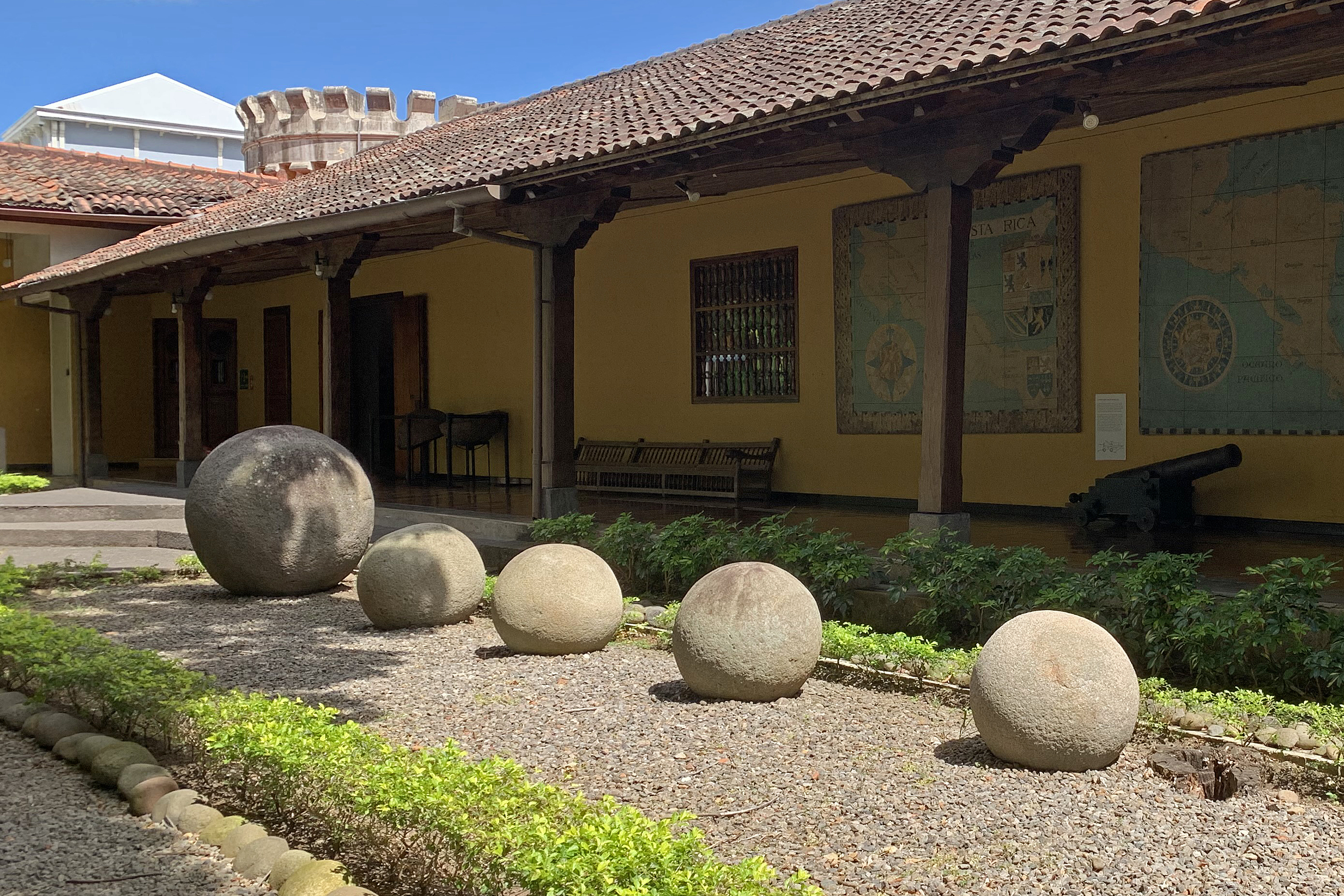
Alignment of five Pre-Columbian stone spheres of Costa Rica in Museo Nacional de Costa Rica.

Several classes of petrospheres exist, such as:

- the stone spheres of Costa Rica,
- painted pebbles from Scotland,
- stone charms from Scotland and sandstone balls from such sites as Traprain Law,
- the carved stone balls, which are mainly from Scotland, although they have also been found in Cumbria and Ireland,
- and carved stone shot for cannons and trebuchets.

Naturally formed stone balls, such as concretions and spherulites, have been at times misidentified as petrospheres. For example, fringe archaeologists and advocates of prehistoric extraterrestrial visitors have repeatedly argued that the stone balls, which range in diameter from 0.61 to 3.35 m (2 ft 0 in to 11 ft 0 in), found around Cerro Piedras Bola in the Sierra de Ameca, between Ahualulco de Mercado and Ameca, in Jalisco, Mexico, are petrospheres. However, these natural stone balls are megaspherulites that have been released by erosion from a 20- to 30-million-year-old ash flow tuff, which originally enclosed them and in which they formed. The proponents of these stone balls being petrospheres base their arguments on the false claims that all of these spheres are perfectly round, that they are composed of granite, and that natural processes cannot produce stone balls. Similarly, cannonball concretions, i.e. those found along the Cannonball River in North Dakota and near Moeraki, South Island, New Zealand, also have been misidentified as petrospheres.

== Palaeolithic shaped stone balls ==
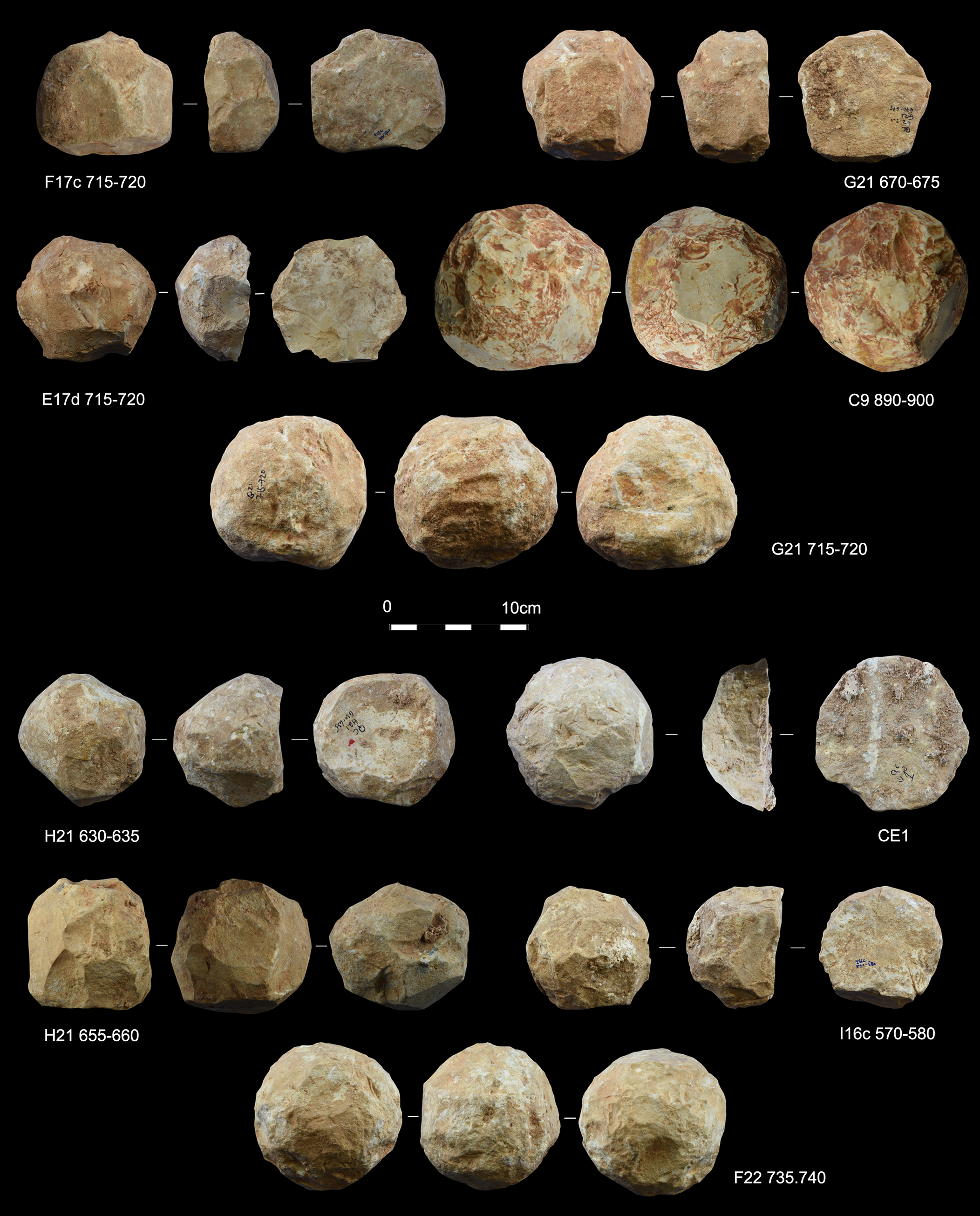
Shaped stone balls from Qesem Cave, c. 420,000–200,000 years old.

Shaped stone balls are found at Palaeolithic sites across Africa, Asia, and Europe, associated with Oldowan (c. 2.6 million – 1.7 million years old), Acheulean (c. 1.76 million – 130,000 years old), and African Middle Stone Age (c. 280,000–50,000 years old) stone tool industries.

The function of shaped stone balls is still debated. Some archaeologists argue that they were deliberately shaped by humans to use as tools; others that they are byproducts of the use of rocks for other purposes.

== See also ==
- Grave orb
- Lithic-Bolas – Type of weighted throwing weapon used in South America
- Rai stones – Micronesian currency
- Lapidary – Shaping of gemstones for jewelry spheres
- Kugel fountain – Sphere floating on a very thin film of water on a fountain basin
- Avogadro project
