= Carved stone balls =

Petrospheres from late Neolithic Scotland

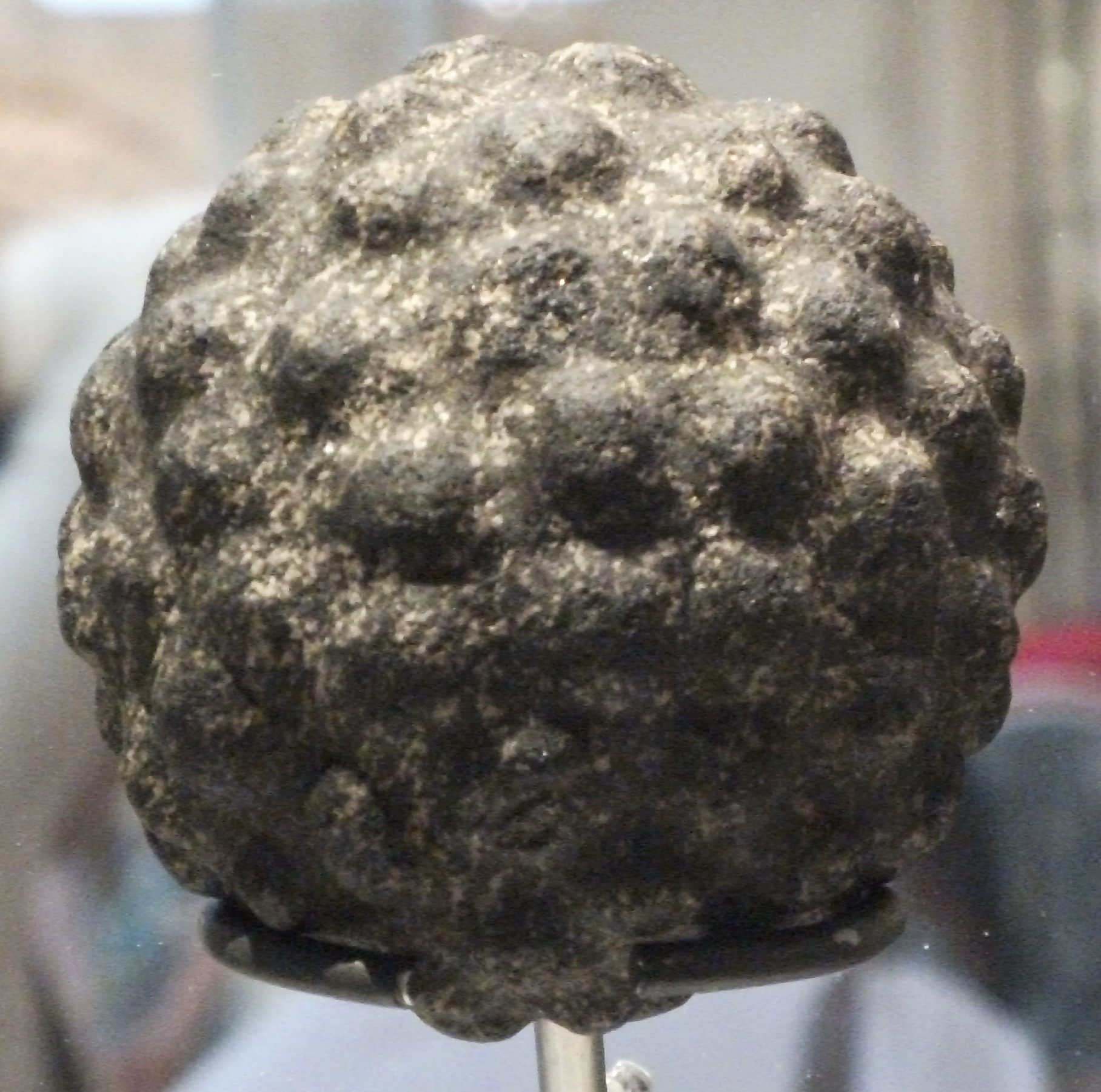
Carved stone ball, classed as Neolithic

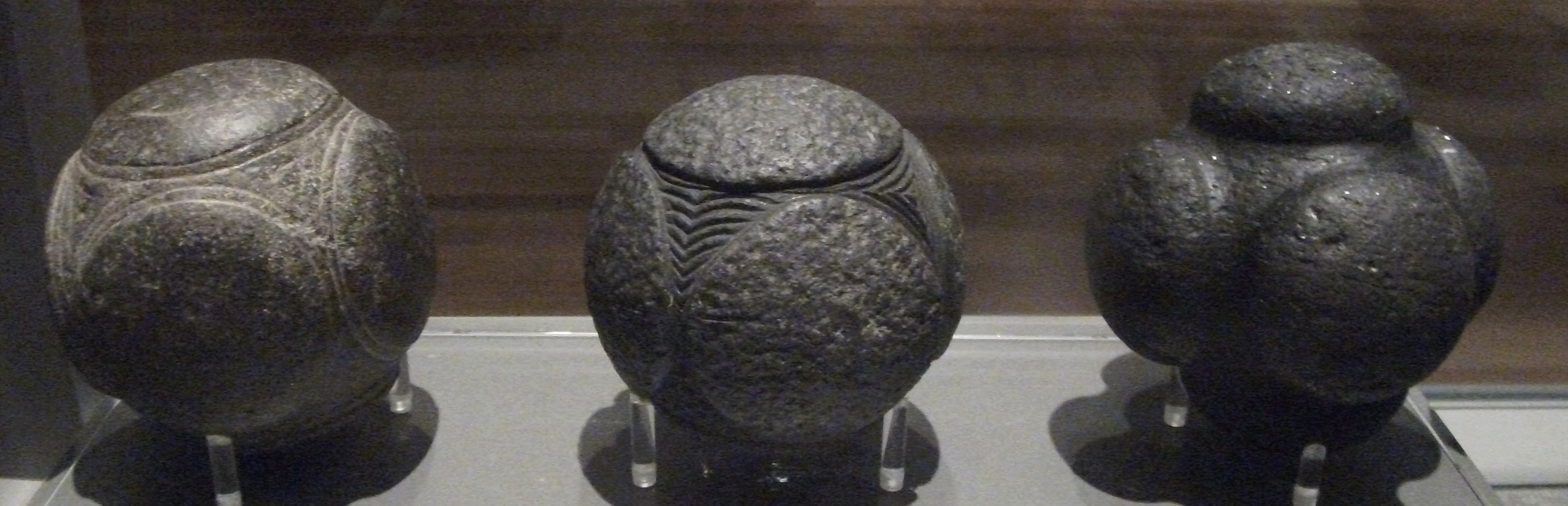
Three Scottish examples, in Kelvingrove Art Gallery and Museum, Glasgow

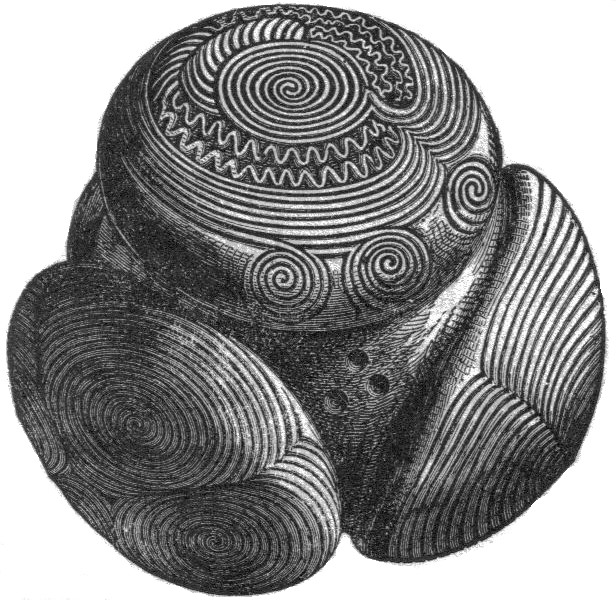
Exceptionally elaborately decorated ball from Towie in Aberdeenshire, dated from 3200–2500 BC

Carved stone balls are petrospheres dated from the Late Neolithic, to possibly as late as the Iron Age, mainly found in Scotland, but also elsewhere in Britain and Ireland. They are usually round and rarely oval, and of fairly uniform size at around 2 3/4 inches or 7 cm across, with anything between 3 and 160 protruding knobs on the surface. They range from having no ornamentation (apart from the knobs) to extensive and highly varied engraved patterns. A wide range of theories has been produced to explain their use or significance, with none gaining very wide acceptance.

They are not to be confused with the much larger smooth round stone spheres of Costa Rica.

== Age and distribution ==
Carved stone balls date as old as 5,200 years old, coming from the Late Neolithic to at least the Bronze Age.

Nearly all have been found in north-east Scotland, the majority in Aberdeenshire, the fertile land lying to the east of the Grampian Mountains. A similar distribution to that of Pictish symbols led to the early suggestion that carved stone balls are Pictish artefacts. The core distribution also reflects that of the Recumbent stone circles. As objects they are very easy to transport and a few have been found on Iona, Skye, Harris, Uist, Lewis, Arran, Hawick, Wigtownshire and fifteen from Orkney. Outside Scotland examples have been found in Ireland at Ballymena, in England at Durham, Cumbria, Lowick, and Bridlington. A single example was found in Norway in a medieval cairn; it is thought most likely that this had been acquired and carried home by a Norseman on an expedition to Scotland. The larger (90mm diameter) balls are all from Aberdeenshire, bar one from Newburgh in Fife.

By the late 1970s, a total of 387 had been recorded. Of these, by far the greatest concentration (169) was found in Aberdeenshire. By 1983, the number had risen to 411 and by 2015, over 425 balls had been recorded. A collection of over 30 carved balls from Scotland, Ireland, and northern England is held by the British Museum.

== Archaeological context ==
Many of the balls have not had their discovery site recorded and most are found as a result of agricultural activity. Five were found at the Neolithic settlement of Skara Brae and one at the Dunadd hillfort. The distribution of the balls is similar to that of mace-heads, which were both weapons and prestige objects used in ceremonial situations. The lack of context is likely to distort the interpretation. Random finds are only likely to have been picked up and entered a collection if they were aesthetically appealing. Damaged and plain balls were less likely to find a market than decorated examples so some more decorated examples might be fraudulent.

Balls of plain sandstone with the facets from shaping still clearly visible were found at Traprain Law in East Lothian. A significant number have already been found here and are known from other southern Scottish Iron Age sites. They may date from the fourth to third centuries BC. These balls are not ornamented and do not have knobs.

In 2013, archaeologists discovered a carved stone ball at Ness of Brodgar, a rare find of such an object in situ in "a modern archaeological context". Early, undecorated, polished stone balls have also been found 'in-situ' inside a 5,500 year-old tomb at Tresness on Orkney by Professor Vicki Cummings.

== Physical characteristics ==
=== Materials ===
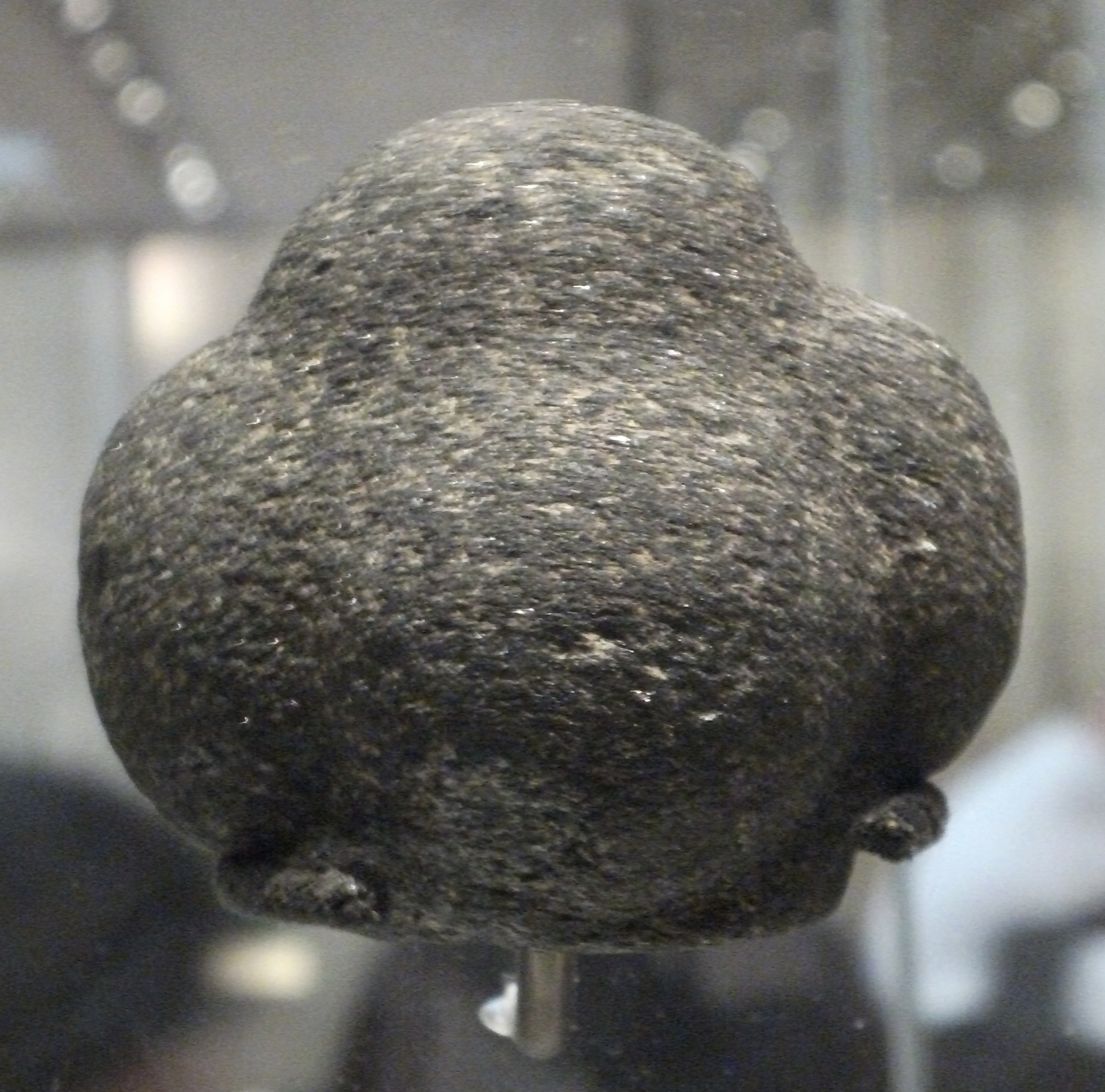
Another example, displayed at the British Museum

Many balls are said to be made of "greenstone", a general term for all varieties of dark, greenish igneous rocks, including diorites, serpentinite, and altered basalts. Including Old Red Sandstone, 43 are sandstone, 26 greenstone, 12 quartzite, and 9 were serpentinite; these had been carved. Some were made of gabbro – a difficult material to carve. Round and oval natural shaped sandstones are sometimes found.

Examples made from hornblende gneiss and granitic gneiss were noted, both very difficult stone to work. Granitic rocks were also used; and the famous Towie example from Aberdeenshire may be serpentinised picrite. The highly ornamented examples were mainly made of sandstone or serpentine. A significant number have not as yet been fully inspected or tested to ascertain their composition.

=== Experimental archaeology ===
Full replicas have been made using authentic manufacturing techniques (pecking and grinding) by A.T. Young. It was shown that they could be made using prehistoric technology with no recourse to the use of metal tools.

=== Size, shape, and knobs ===
Of the 387 carved stone balls known in 1976 (now about 425), 375 are about 70 mm in diameter, but twelve are known with diameters of 90 to 114 mm. Only 7 are oval. They are therefore about the size of tennis balls or oranges. Nearly half have 6 knobs.

Carved stone ball shape
| Carved protrusions | Number of finds |
|---|---|
| 3 knobs | 3 |
| 4 knobs | 43 |
| 5 knobs | 3 |
| 6 knobs | ~240 |
| 7 knobs | 18 |
| 8 knobs | 9 |
| 9 knobs | 3 |
| 10–55 knobs | 52 |
| 70–160 knobs | 14 |

=== Ornamentation ===
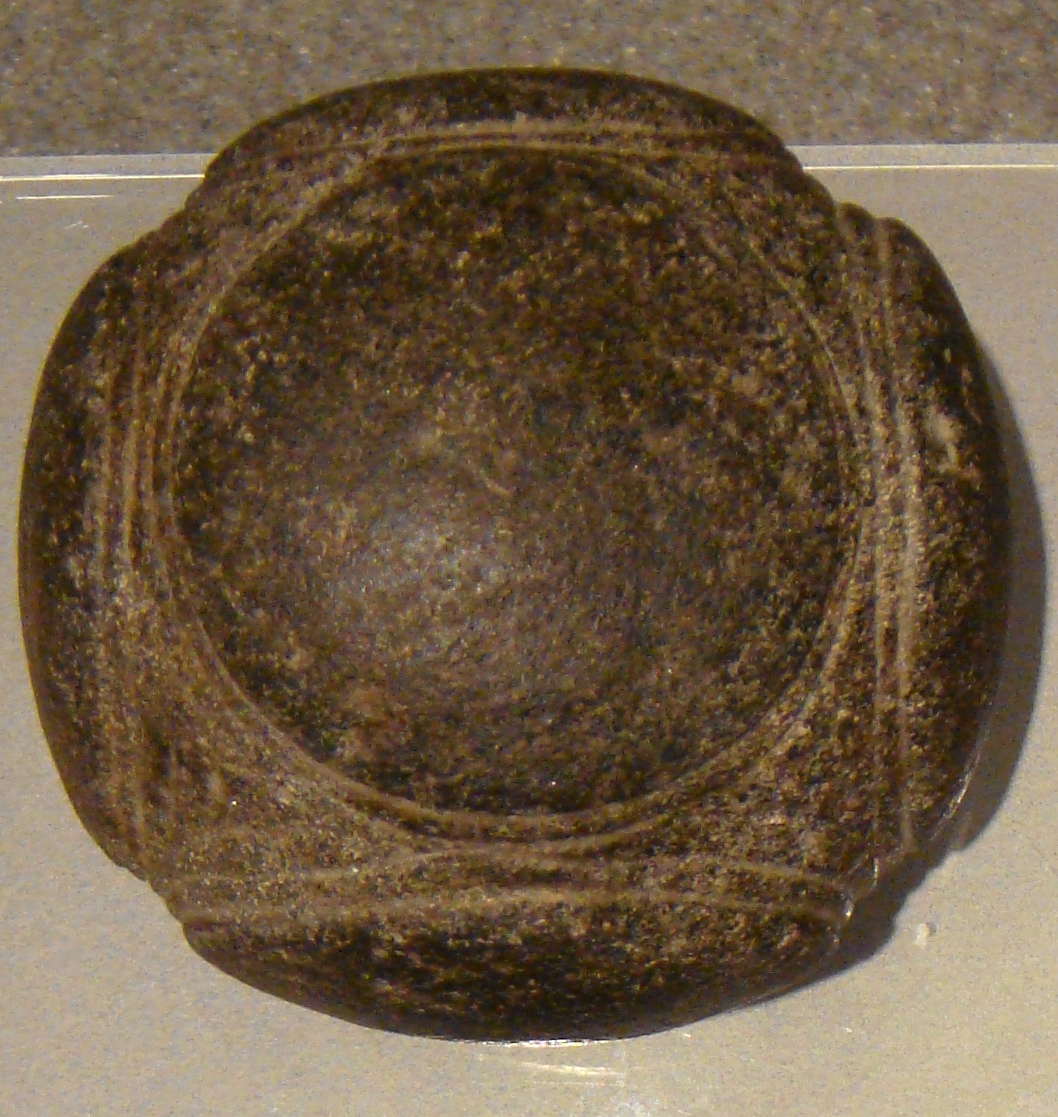
Carved stone ball with low-profile knobs

The decoration used falls into three categories:

- those with spirals
- those with concentric circles
- those with patterns of straight incised lines and hatchings

More than one design is used on the same ball and the standard of artwork varies from the extremely crude to the highly expert which only an exceptionally skilled craftsman could have produced. Some balls have designs on the interspaces between the knobs which must be significant in the context of the speculated use of these artefacts.

Twenty-six of the six-knobbed balls are decorated. The Orkney examples are unusual, being either all ornamented or otherwise unusual in appearance, such as the lack, bar one example, of the frequently found six-knobbed type. Metal may have been used to work some of the designs.

The Towie ball from Aberdeenshire has some design similarities with the carvings on the Folkton Drums. These were found in a tumulus in England and are made of chalk with elaborate carvings, among which are distinct oculi or eyes. Concentric carved lines on stone balls appear to be stylised oculi. This ball also has a roughly triangular arrangement of three dots in an interspace between the knobs. This appears to be identical to the arrangement of dots found on the Parkhill silver chain terminal ring, found near Aberdeen, a Pictish artefact. It is possible that the dots represent a name, as some of the Pictish symbols at least are thought to represent personal names.

Spirals or plastic ornament which is similar to Grooved Ware is found on the Aberdeenshire examples, this being a type of late Neolithic pottery not known in the north-east but common in Orkney and Fife. The Newgrange carvings in Ireland show strong similarities to those found on some balls. A continuous spiral is found on one and elements of chevrons, zig-zags and concentric triangles are also found, stimulating comparisons with petrosomatoglyph symbolism. Mostly the different knobs have different or sometimes no ornamentation. A 'golf-ball' variety of ornamentation is found on a few balls. The carving does not appear to have any practical purpose in general, however it has been suggested that one type, with very distinct knobs, was used for processing copper ores (see under 'Function'). Some of the bold triangles and criss-cross incisions seem to be more Iron Age in character than Neolithic or Bronze Age.

== Function ==
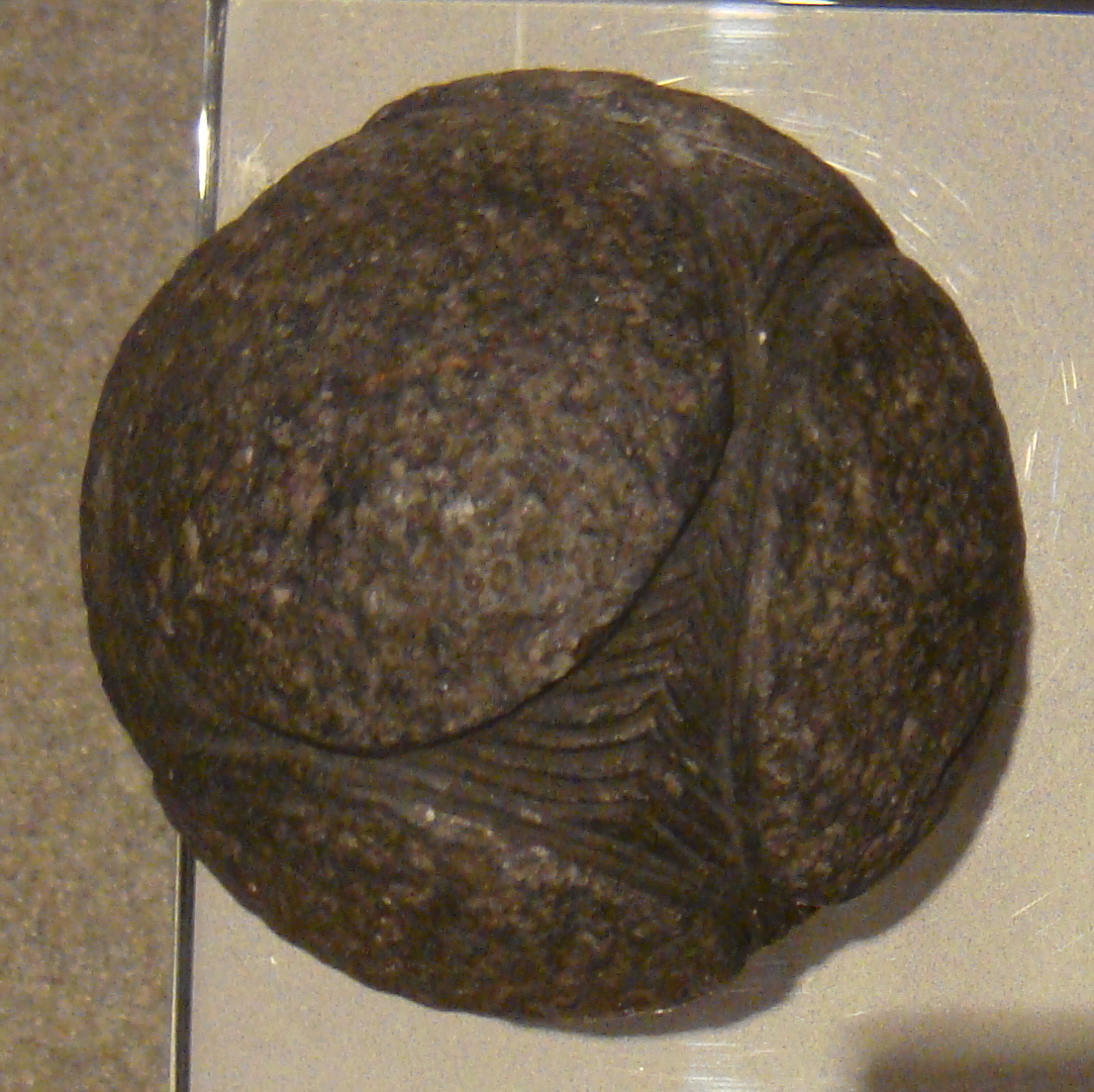
Glasgow example

=== Suggested ceremonial use ===
- The possible use of the balls as oracles has been suggested. The way in which the ball came to rest could be interpreted as a message from the gods or an answer to a question.
- An alternative or supplementary use could have been as the 'right to speak' where discussions are controlled by the requirement for the speaker to hold the carved stone ball or if not, then keep their peace and listen to the views of others. The balls are of a size that fits comfortably in one hand.

=== Suggested practical use ===
- Some of the balls have grooves or interspaces between the knobs into which leather could be tied so as to make a device such as a bola. Their use as weapons was suggested by many researchers but in recent years this idea has fallen from favour.
- 'Sink stones' (fishing weights) found in Denmark and Ireland have some slight similarities, these artefacts being used in conjunction with fishing nets. Similarly, they might have been used as loom weights, but neither loom weights nor fishing weights have any particular need for uniform diameter.
- Lynne Kelly, in her 2016 book The Memory Code, posits that such stones were used as memory aids by the pre-literate peoples, citing similarities to objects in other cultures.

=== Megalith construction aid ===
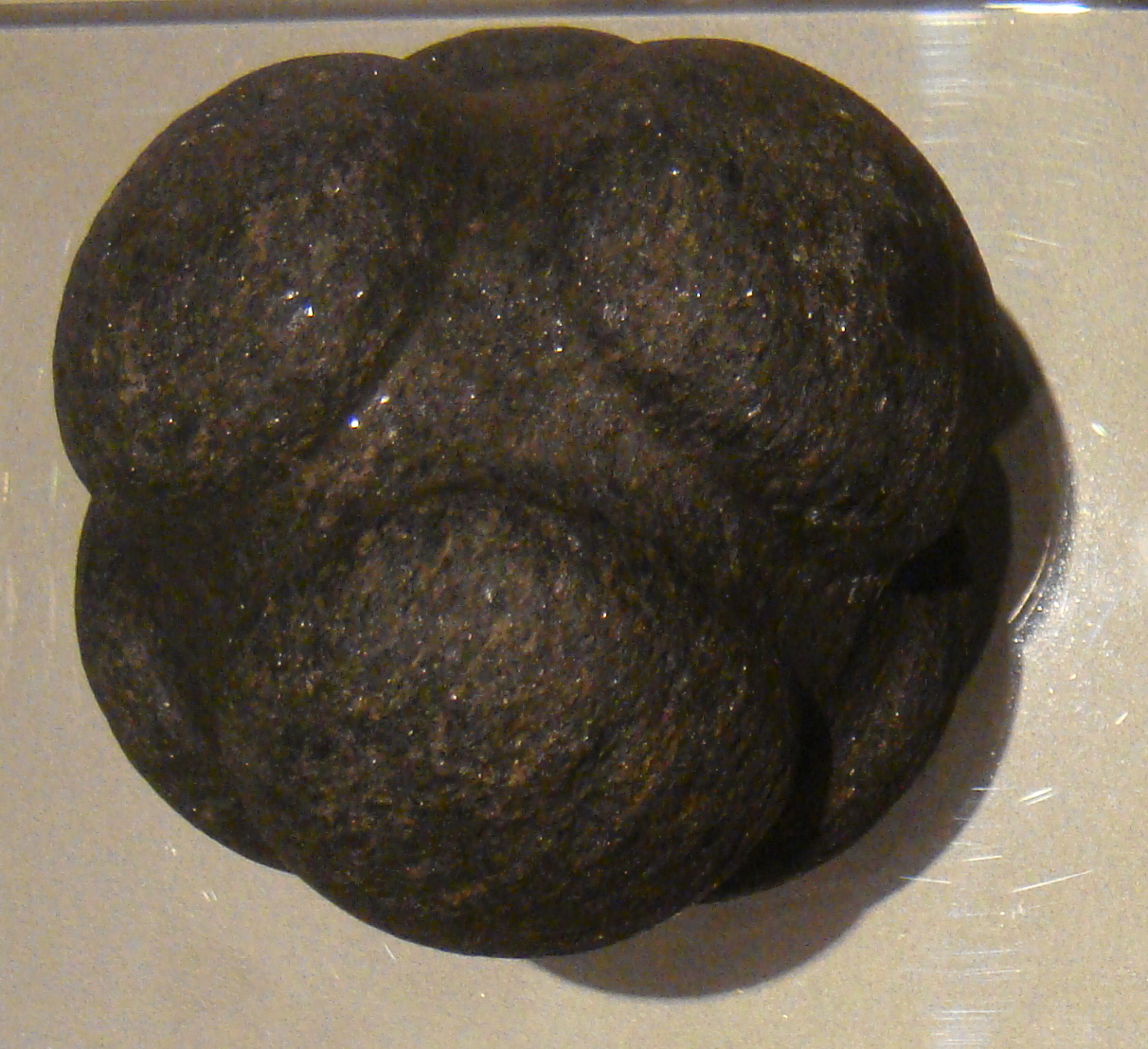
Another in Glasgow

A theory on the movement of megalithic stones for monuments has been put forward as a result of an observed correlation between standing stone circles and a concentration of carved stone balls. The suggestion is that the stone balls might have been used like ball bearings for transporting big stones.

Many of the late Neolithic stone balls have diameters differing by only a millimetre, suggesting that uniform size was important for their purpose. This led to the suggestion that they might have been meant to be used together, or interchangeably. By mapping find-sites in Aberdeenshire, Scotland, it can be shown that often these small stone spheres were found in the vicinity of Neolithic megalithic circles.

To test the proposal, experimental archeologists built a model system, substituting hard wooden balls made to the same size. The balls were placed into grooves cut in parallel longitudinal wooden 'sleepers'; these supported an overlying carrying-board that the giant test stone rode on. At least in the situation tested, the model showed such heavy transport to be practical.

== Platonic solids ==
The carved stone balls have been taken as evidence of knowledge of the five Platonic solids a millennium before Plato described them. Indeed, some of them exhibit the symmetries of Platonic solids, but the extent of this and how much it depends on mathematical understanding is disputed, as configurations resembling the solids can naturally arise when fitting equal-sized knobs with minimal gaps onto the surface of a sphere. There does not appear to be much special attention given to the Platonic solid arrangements over less symmetrical arrangements of knobs over the balls, and some of the five solids do not appear.

== See also ==
- Brain balls, in Irish archaeology proposed balls made from calcification of enemy's brains
- List of prehistoric artworks
- Roman dodecahedron

== Sources ==
- Smith, John Alexander (1874–1876). "Notes of small ornamented stone balls found in different parts of Scotland, &c., with remarks on their supposed age and use". Proceedings of the Society of Antiquaries of Scotland. V (11): 29–62.
- Smith, John Alexander (1874–1876). "Additional notes of small ornamented stone balls found in different parts of Scotland, &c". Proceedings of the Society of Antiquaries of Scotland. V (11): 313–319.
