= Nahal Oren =

Nahal Oren may refer to:

- Nahal Oren (wadi), a wadi (ephemeral riverbed that contains water only when heavy rain occurs) on the western slopes of Mount Carmel in northern Israel
- Nahal Oren (archaeological site), an archaeological site on the northern bank of the wadi of Nahal Oren
