= Sha'ar HaGolan (archaeological site) =

Archaeological site in Israel

Map showing the region of Sha'ar HaGolan, type site of the Yarmukian culture.

Sha'ar HaGolan is a Neolithic archaeological site near Kibbutz Sha'ar HaGolan in Israel. The type site of the Yarmukian culture, it is notable for the discovery of a significant number of artistic objects, as well as some of the earliest pottery in the Southern Levant.

The first Yarmukian settlement was unearthed at Tel Megiddo during the 1930s, but was not identified as a distinct Neolithic culture at the time. At Sha'ar HaGolan, in 1949, professor Moshe Stekelis first identified the Yarmukian culture, a Pottery Neolithic culture that inhabited parts of Israel and Jordan. The site, dated to ca. 6400–6000 BC (calibrated), is located in the central Jordan Valley, on the northern bank of the Yarmouk River. Its size is around 20 hectares, making it one of the largest settlements in the world at that time. Although other Yarmukian sites have been identified since, Sha'ar HaGolan is the largest, probably indicating its role as the Yarmukian center.

The site was excavated by two teams from the Hebrew University of Jerusalem: one led by Moshe Stekelis (1949–1952), and the other by Yosef Garfinkel (1989–90, 1996–2004), and later co-directed with Michele A. Miller (1998–2000). While during the earlier excavations no architecture was found, the second expedition uncovered large courtyard houses, ranging between 250 and 700 m^{2} in area. The courtyard house makes its first appearance at Sha'ar HaGolan, giving the site a special significance in architectural history. This is an architectural concept still found among traditional Mediterranean societies. Monumental construction on this scale is unknown elsewhere during this period. The houses consist of a central courtyard surrounded by several small rooms.

The houses were separated by streets, which constitute evidence of advanced community planning. The dig uncovered a central street about 3 m wide, paved with pebbles set in mud, and a narrow winding alley 1 m wide. These are the earliest streets discovered in Israel and among the earliest streets built by man. A 4.15 m well dug to the local water table indicates a knowledge of hydraulics. Exotic objects discovered during the excavations include sea shells from the Mediterranean, polished stone vessels made of alabaster (or marble), and blades made from obsidian from Turkey. The presence of obsidian points to trade connections extending over 700 km.

== Pottery ==
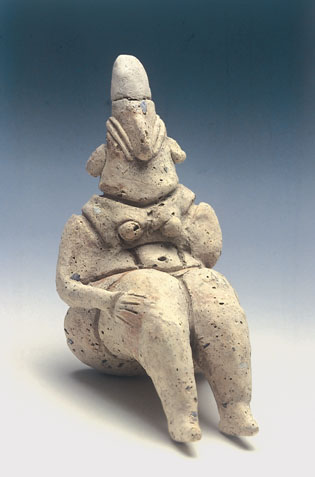
Female clay figurine, Sha'ar HaGolan

The greatest technological innovation of the Sha'ar HaGolan Neolithic was the manufacture of pottery. This industry, which appears here for the first time in Israel, gives this cultural stage its name of Pottery Neolithic. The pottery vessels are in a variety of shapes and sizes and were put to various domestic uses.

At the site of 'Ain Ghazal, located along the banks of the Zarqa River near Amman, Jordan, the early Pottery Neolithic period is dated from 6,400 to 5,000 BC.

In July 2022, archaeologists from the Israel Antiquities Authority announced the discovery of a 8000 years-old "Mother Goddess" figurine. Anna Eirikh-Rose, co-director of the excavation reported that the 20-centimeter long figurine covered by a bracelet with a red bottom was found broken into 2 pieces. It was sculpted in a sitting position with big hips, a unique pointed hat and what is known as ‘coffee-bean’ eyes and a big nose.

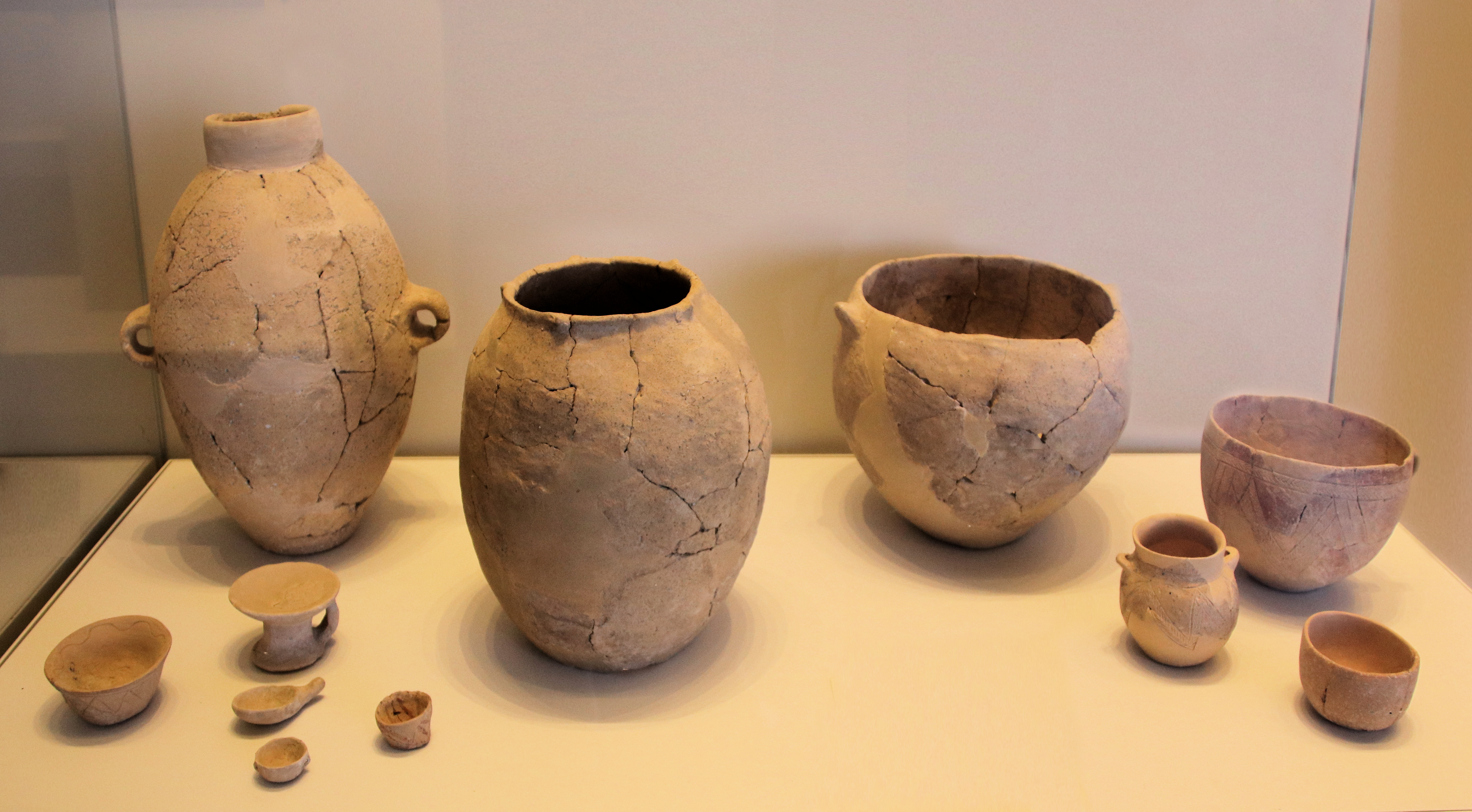
Early Pottery Vessels, Yarmukian Culture

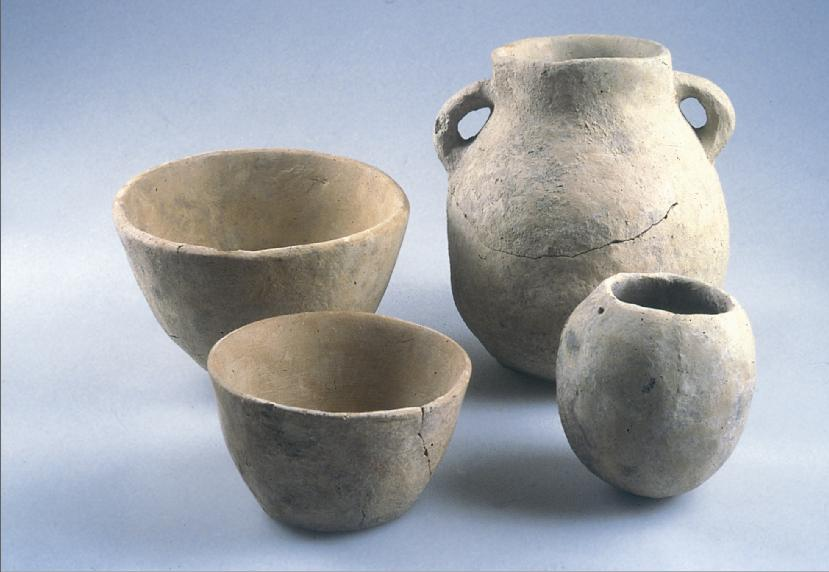
Sha'ar HaGolan, pottery

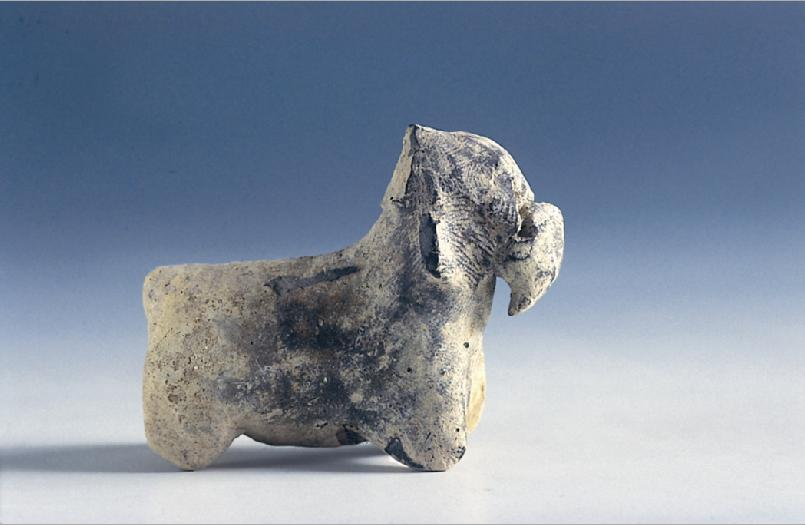
Sha'ar HaGolan, zoomorphic figurine

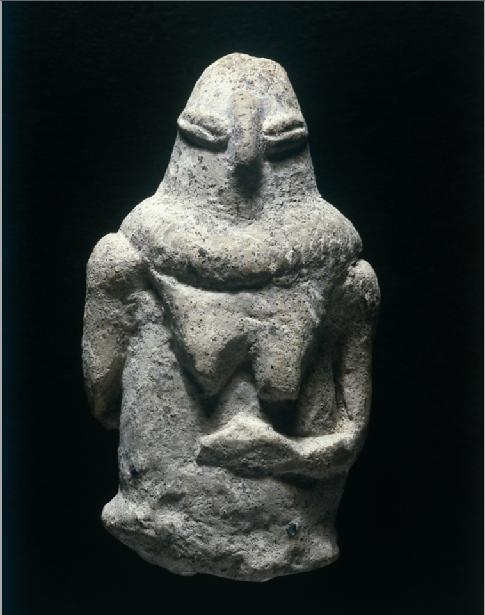
Sha'ar HaGolan, clay figurine

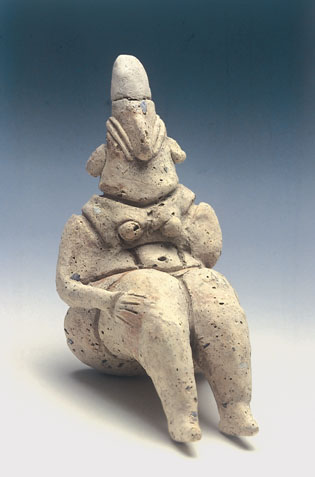

== Art ==
About 300 art objects were found at Sha'ar HaGolan, making it the main center of prehistoric art in Israel and one of the most important in the world. One of the houses yielded approximately 70 figurines made of stone or fired clay. No other single building of the Neolithic period has yielded that many prehistoric figurines. Among the outstanding art objects from Sha'ar HaGolan are figurines in human form made of fired clay or carved on pebbles. The overwhelming majority are female images, interpreted as representing a goddess. The clay figurines are extravagant in their detail, giving them a surrealistic appearance, while the pebble figurines are minimalist and abstract in form. The members of Kibbutz Sha'ar HaGolan have built a museum that exhibits the finds from the nearby site. Because of the unique artistic quality of the figurines from Sha'ar Hagolan, both the Metropolitan Museum of New York and the Louvre Museum in Paris have mounted ten-year exhibits of objects from the site. In Israel, figurines are exhibited at the Israel Museum in Jerusalem.

== Gallery ==
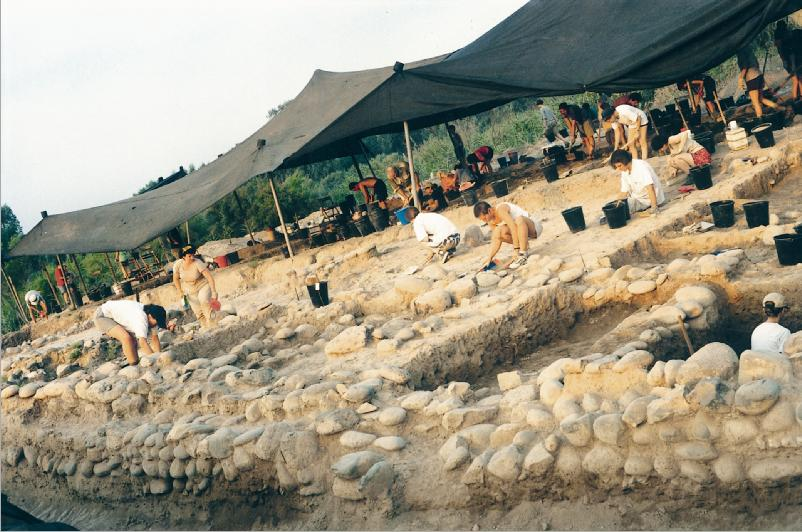
Sha'ar HaGolan, excavations 1998

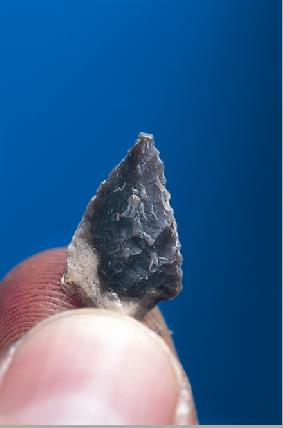
Sha'ar HaGolan, flint arrowhead

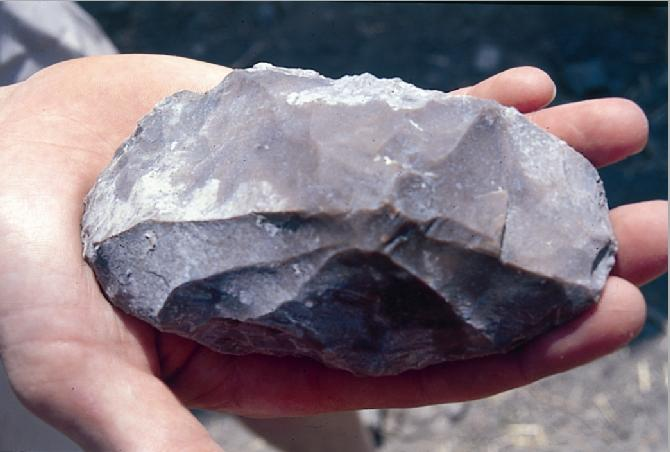
Sha'ar HaGolan, flint axe

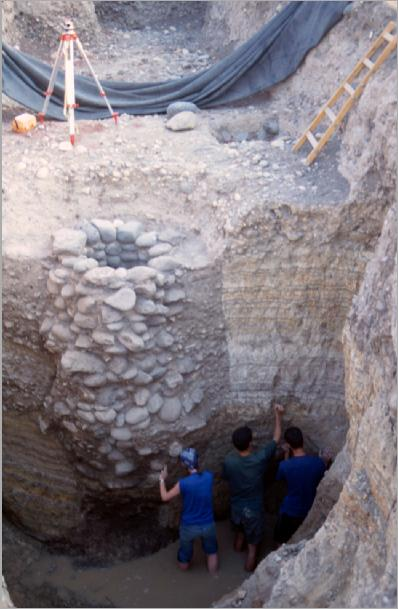
Sha'ar HaGolan, well

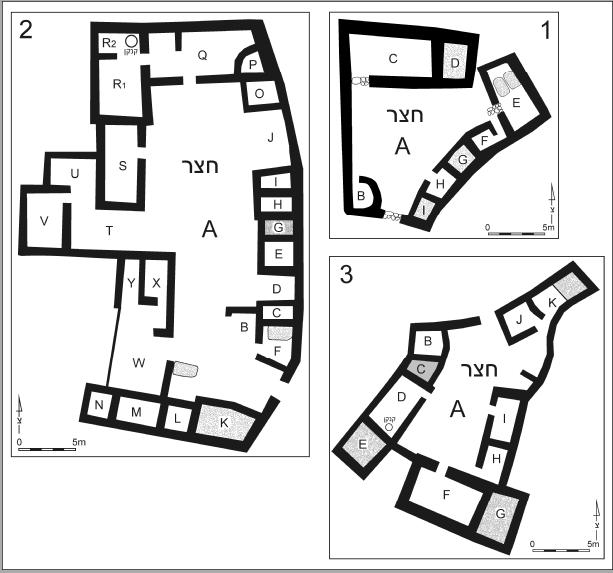
Sha'ar HaGolan, courtyard buildings

== Bibliography ==
- Garfinkel Y. 1993. The Yarmukian Culture in Israel. Paléorient, Vol 19, No. 1, pp. 115 – 134.
- Garfinkel Y. 1999. The Yarmukians, Neolithic Art from Sha'ar Hagolan. Jerusalem: Bible Lands Museum (Exhibition Catalogue).
