= Qafzeh Cave =

Prehistoric cave in northern Israel

- Kedumim Cave
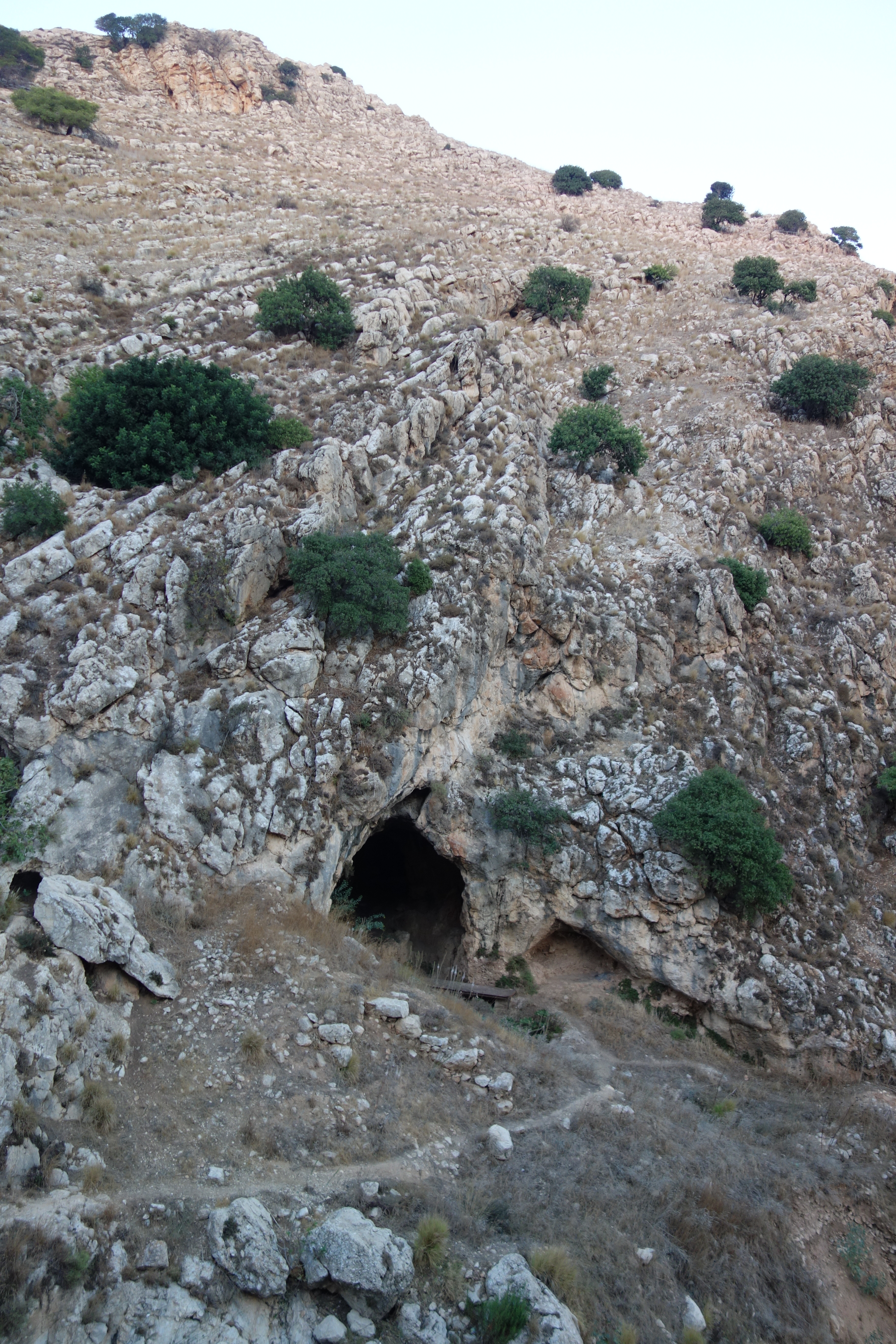

- Location within Jezreel Valley region of Israel
- 32°41′19″N 35°19′05″E
- Type: Prehistoric cave
- Periods: Middle Paleolithic
- Cultures: Mousterian
- Location: Mount Precipice, Israel
- Region: Lower Galilee

Site notes
- Elevation: 150 m (490 ft)
- Archaeologists: Moshe Stekelis

Qafzeh Cave (Arabic: كهف القفزة, lit. 'Cave of the Precipice', Hebrew: מערת קפזה), or Kedumim Cave (Hebrew: מערת קדומים, lit. 'Cave of the Ancients'), is a prehistoric archaeological site located at the bottom of Mount Precipice in the Jezreel Valley of Lower Galilee south of Nazareth, Israel. Important remains of prehistoric people were discovered on the site - some of the oldest examples in the world, outside of Africa, of virtually anatomically modern human beings. These were discovered on the ledge just outside the cave, where 18 layers from the Middle Paleolithic era were identified. The interior of the cave contains layers ranging from the Neolithic era to the Bronze Age.

== Names ==
The Arabic name of the mountain is Jebel el-Qafzeh, 'Mount of the Leap', and the cave's name is derived from it, Qafzeh Cave, sometimes spelled Qafza Cave, with article becoming al-Kafza (Cave).

By translation to Hebrew, the name becomes Meʿarat Har HaKfitza, or sometimes Mt. HaKfitza Cave, HaKfitza(h) Cave, or Meʿarat Qafzeh. Another Hebrew name is Meʿarat Kedumim or Kedumim Cave.

The various caves in the system are separately numbered using Roman numerals.

== Excavations ==
Excavations of the site began in 1932, led by Moshe Stekelis and René Neuville, but were interrupted due to a collapse. In 1936, during the Arab rebellion in Palestine, the British blew up the cave because it was being used as a hideout by gangs associated with the rebels. Excavations were renewed in 1965, by Bernard Vandermeersch, Ofer Bar-Yosef, then continued, intermittently, until 1979.

== Findings ==
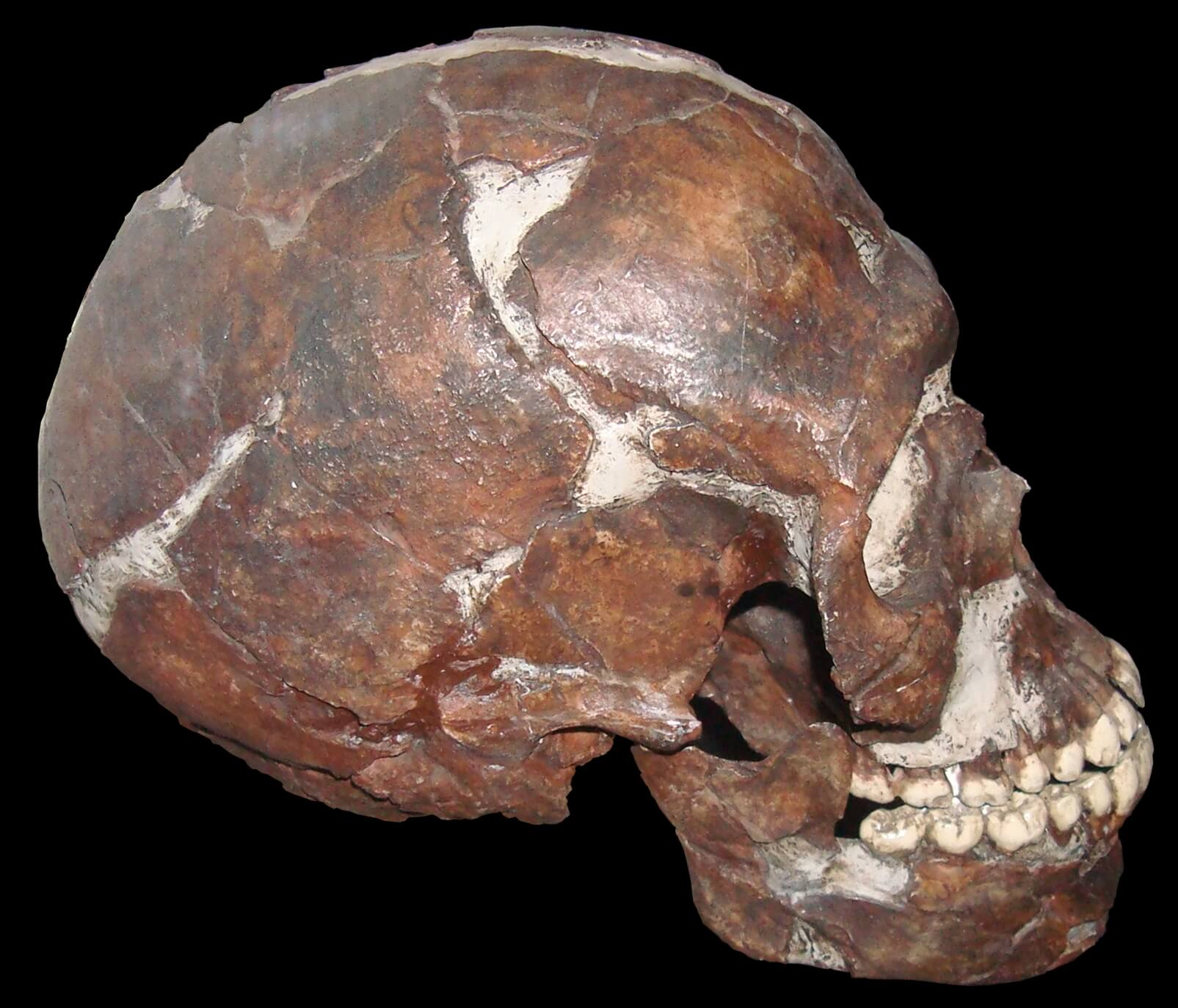
Early modern human skull from Qafzeh

Among the finds on the site are stoves, stone tools belonging to the Mousterian culture, and also human and animal bones, which attest to the fact that the cave had been used both for residence and as a burial site. The remains of 15 human skeletons were discovered on site, in a Mousterian archaeological context. Seven of them are skeletons of adults and the rest of children. The high proportion of children skeletons is unique among Middle Palaeolithic sites, and it led researchers to look for signs of trauma or disease that might have led to their premature deaths. One child, Qafzeh 12, of around 3 years of age, by modern reference standards, had abnormalities indicating hydrocephalus. Five of these skeletons were found buried in an orderly fashion in the cave's floor, one being the remains of a 12-13 year old boy found with European fallow deer (Dama dama) horns next to his chest. He had been placed in a rectangular grave carved out of the bedrock, with his arms folded alongside his body and his hands placed on either side of his neck. The boy's skull bears signs of a head trauma that had probably been the cause of death. The site was dated to circa 92,000 ya using thermoluminescence.

Human remains found in the cave were preserved at the Institut de paléontologie humaine (IPH) de Paris and the largest part of Neville's lithic series was preserved at the Rockefeller Museum in Jerusalem.

Skeletons, isolated bones and teeth found in the cave belong to at least 28 people. Remains of Qafzeh 9 and 10 that were found in a double burial, are nearly complete and belong to a young male and a child.

An additional important find was the remains of ochre that were found on human bones, and, also, 71 pieces of ochre that were associated with burial practices, which indicates that ceremonial funerary rites that included symbolic acts which held special meaning had already been common around 100,000 years ago. Ochre was used for body dyeing and ornamentation. It was also used during the burial of a brain damaged child that was found in the cave. Red, black and yellow ochre-painted seashells were found around the cave.

According to C. Loring Brace: "Qafzeh represents the pattern still found in sub-Saharan Africa, particularly West Africa. Although the craniofacial configuration in both is 'modern', the dentition of Qafzeh is archaic in size and form. Qafzeh is a logical representative of the ancestral form for sub-Saharan Africans but not for Cro-Magnon and subsequent Europeans."

=== Stone tools ===
The stone tools discovered at the site - side scrapers, disc cores and points - were of the Levallois-Mousterian type. These tools are often associated with Neanderthal settlements. Animal remains of horse, woodland-adapted red deer, rhinoceros, fallow deer, wild ox and gazelle, land snails were also found at the site stand for Mousterian and Upper Paleolithic period.

== See also ==
- Prehistory of the Levant
- Skhul Cave

== Bibliography ==
- Rut, Yehuda (1959), "The Forgotten Cave", Al Hamishmar, archived from the original on 1 December 2017.
- Vandermeersch, Bernard, Qafzeh, History of Discoveries.
