= Masada (kibbutz) =

Masada: מַסָּדָה (Hebrew)
- Kibbutz
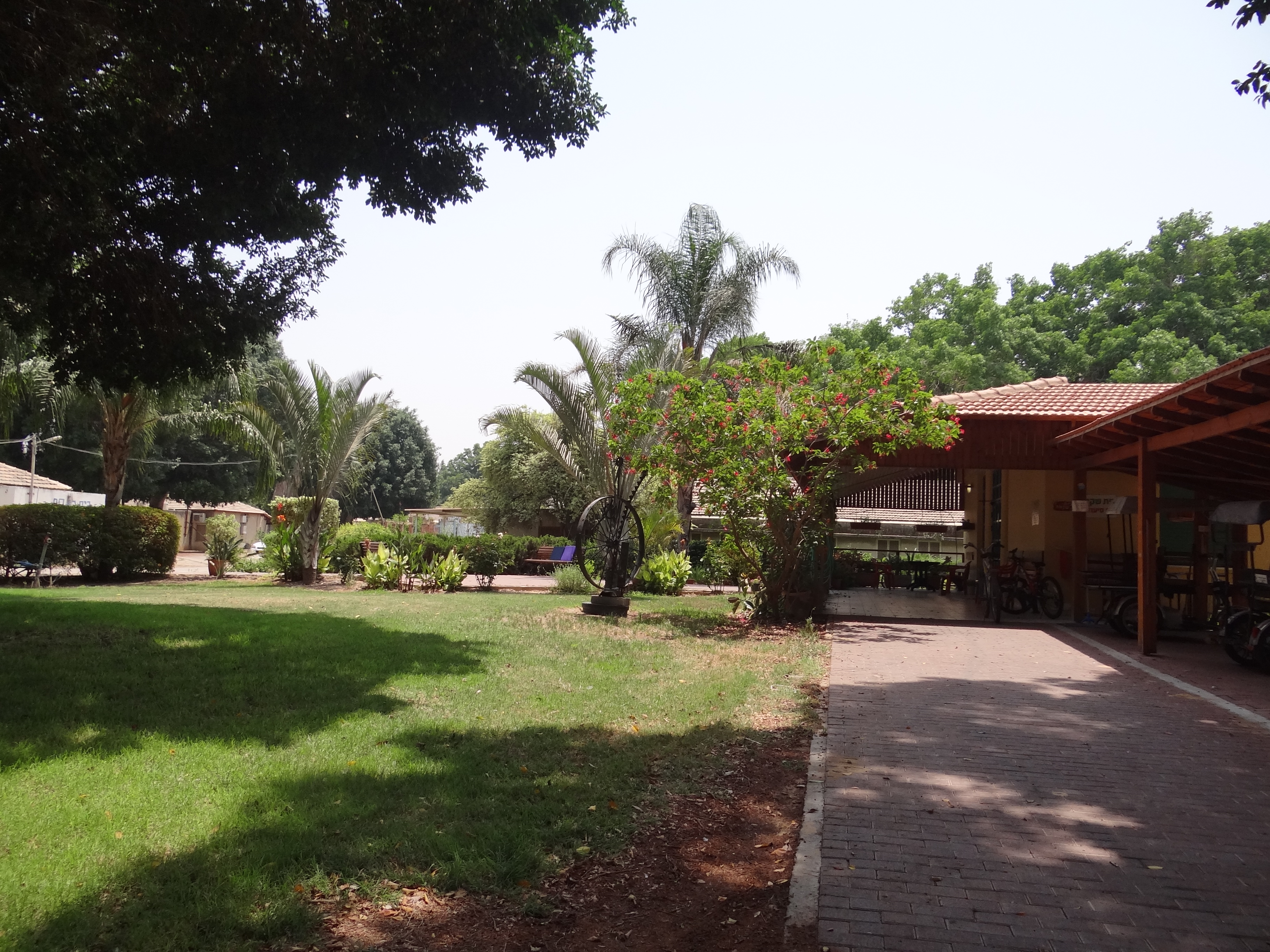

- Location within Northeast Israel Location within Israel
- Coordinates: 32°41′0″N 35°35′55″E
- Country: Israel
- District: Northern
- Subdistrict: Kinneret
- Council: Emek HaYarden
- Affiliation: Kibbutz Movement
- Founded: 1937
- Founder: Romanian Jews
- Population (2024): 371

Masada (Hebrew: מַסָּדָה) is a kibbutz in northern Israel. Located in the northern Jordan Valley near the Sea of Galilee, it falls under the jurisdiction of Emek HaYarden Regional Council. In 2024 it had a population of 371. Although still called a kibbutz, it privatized itself in 2006.

== Etymology ==
The name of the kibbutz was taken from the epic poem "Masada" by Yitzhak Lamdan, itself named after the fortress of Masada by the Dead Sea. It has nothing to do with the Hebrew word for base or foundation, "massad". The fortress of Masada is called in Hebrew "Metzadá" (מצדה), but Yitzhak Lamdan, although writing in Hebrew, used the name as it is known from the works of Josephus, "Masada" (מסדה). Lamdan's poem was extremely influential among Zionist Jews at the time the kibbutz was established.

== History ==
The kibbutz was founded in 1937 as part of the tower and stockade program by immigrants from Romania and members of kibbutz Sha'ar HaGolan.

As with Sha'ar HaGolan, the kibbutz's defenders retreated during the Battles of the Kinarot Valley of the 1948 Arab–Israeli War after holding out for four days of fighting. The two kibbutzim were captured and briefly held by the Syrian Army, during which time they were looted and burned down. Although the members made every reasonable effort to defend their kibbutz and returned soon after the events, a stigma was attached to them, and vindication in the form of released military records only arrived in recent years, decades too late.

Masada, like dozens of the kibbutzim near the Sea of Galilee, existed under the threat from both the Syrian Golan Heights towering from the east, and the Jordanians across the Yarmouk River. On 29 March 1968 a tractor from Masada hit a landmine, killing the driver and three passengers. Israeli forces came to evacuate the casualties, and Jordanian forces opened fire on them. In retaliation, the Israel Air Force attacked Jordanian targets east of Beit She'an. Several planes were damaged by anti-aircraft fire yet returned safely to base.

Masada suffered greatly under the economic collapse of the 1980s which affected it more harshly than other kibbutzim. In 2006 the kibbutz was privatized.

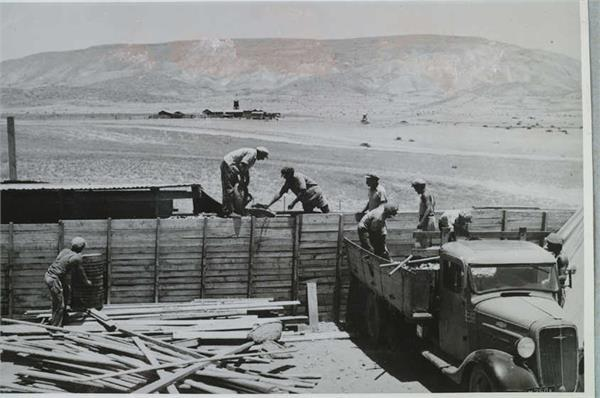
Masada under construction 1937, Shaʽar HaGolan in distance

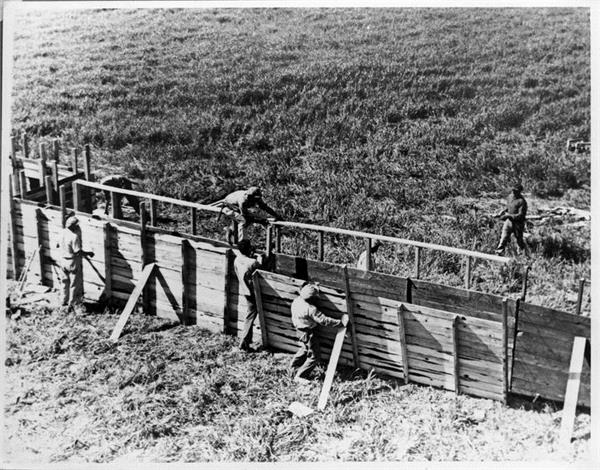
Masada under construction 1937

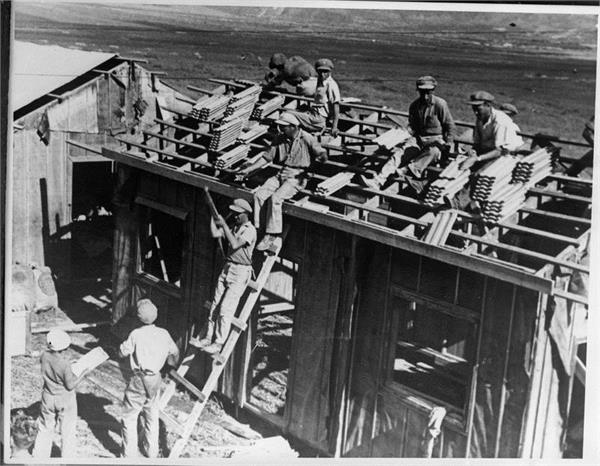
Masada barracks under construction 1937

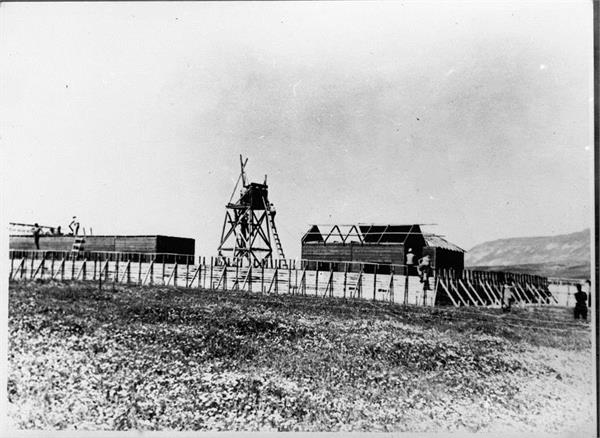
Masada tower under construction 1937

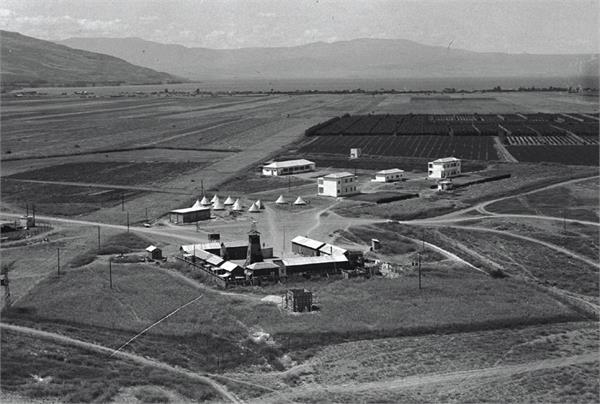
Masada 1939

== Notable people ==
- Lior Karmi (born 1975), sprint canoer
- Ofer Lifschitz (born 1958), politician
