= Mount Precipice =

Mountain in Israel

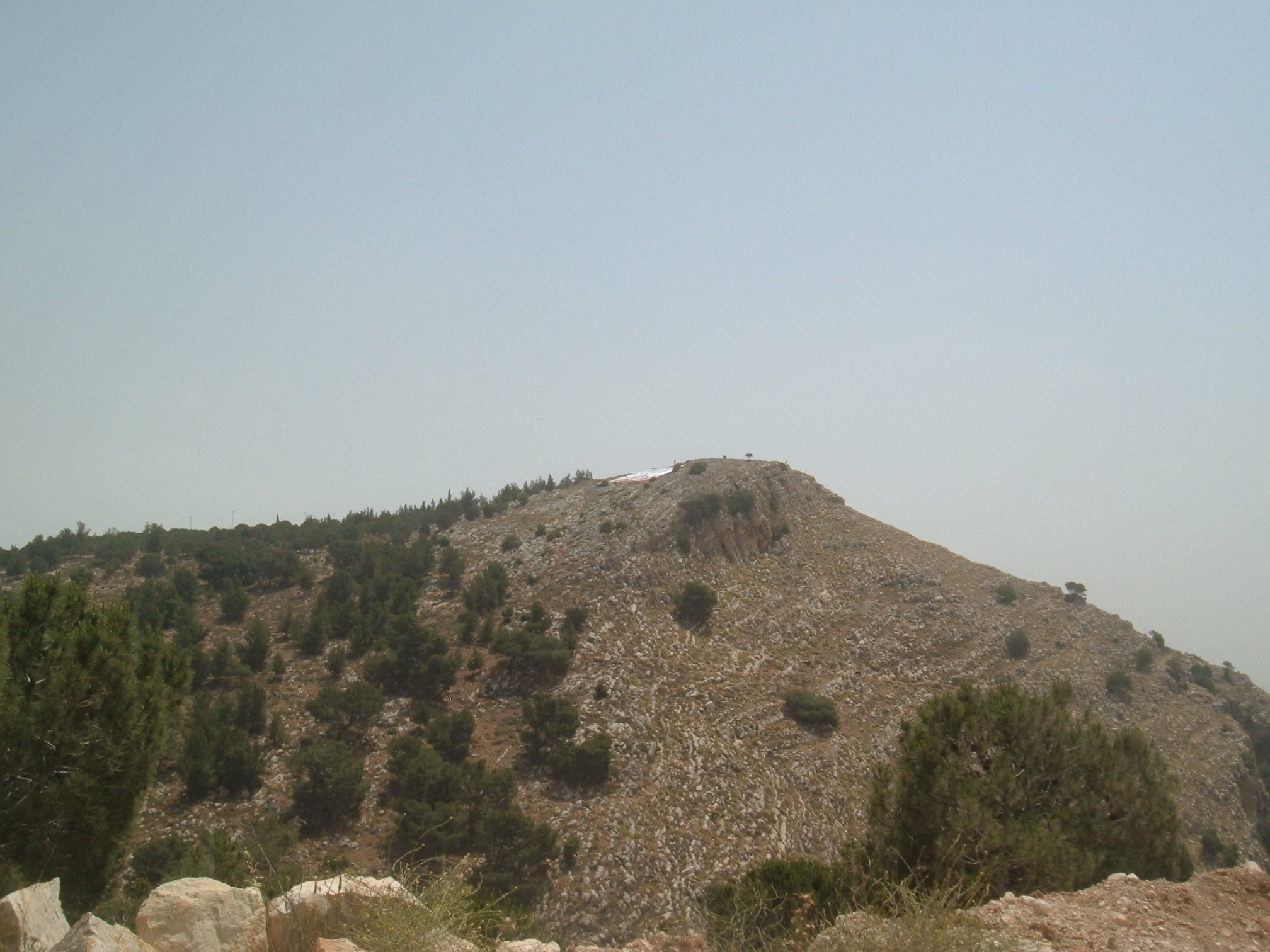

Highest point
- Elevation: 395 m (1,296 ft)
- Coordinates: 32°40′58″N 35°17′55″E

Geography
- Location: Nazareth

Mount Precipice (Hebrew: הר הקפיצה, "Har HaKfitsa"; Arabic: جبل القفزة, "Jebel al-Qafzeh", "Mount of the Leap"), also known as Mount of Precipitation, Mount of the Leap of the Lord and Mount Kedumim is located just outside the southern edge of Nazareth, 2.0 km southwest of the modern city center.

It is believed by some to be the site of the Rejection of Jesus described in the Gospel of Luke (Luke 4:29–30). According to the story, the people of Nazareth, not accepting Jesus as Messiah tried to push him from the mountain, but "he passed through the midst of them and went away."

Archaeological excavations in the Qafzeh Cave in the mountain found human remains, whose estimated age is 100,000 years old. The human skeletons were associated with red ochre which was found only alongside the bones, suggesting that the burials were symbolic in nature. Previous to this discovery, scientists believed that human symbolic reasoning evolved much later, about 50,000 years ago.

During the 20th century the mountain was used as a quarry, now abandoned. Highway 60 goes through a tunnel dug in the mountain in the site of the old quarry, connecting Afula and Jezreel Valley (Arabic - Marj Ibn Amer) directly to Nazareth.

On 14 May 2009, Pope Benedict XVI celebrated a Mass on this mountain, during his visit to the Holy Land. 40,000 people participated.

== See also ==
- Skhul and Qafzeh hominids
