= Nahal Oren (archaeological site) =

Archaeological site in Israel

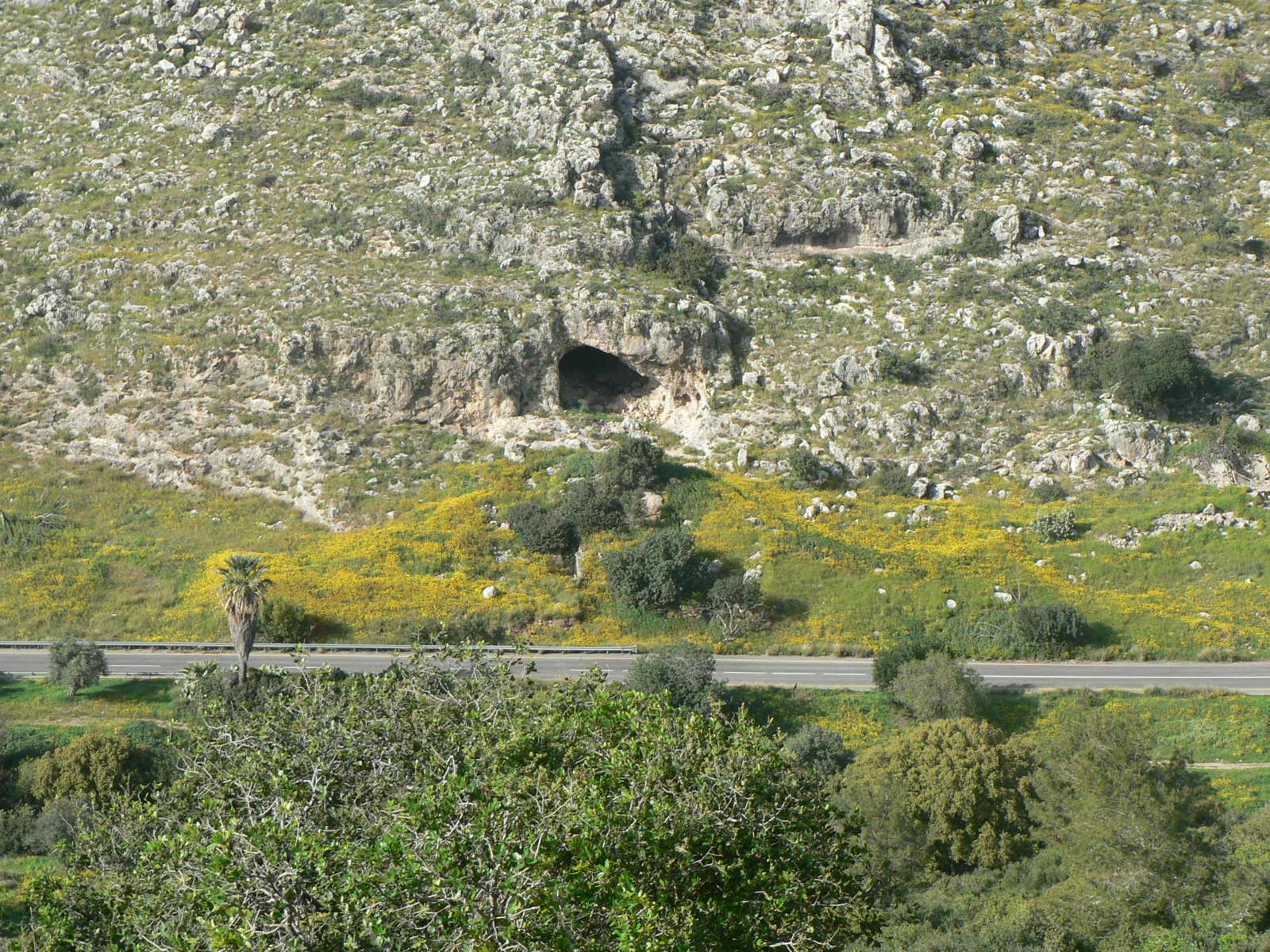
- Nahal Oren Cave and the prehistoric site

- Location within Haifa region of Israel
- 32°43′N 34°58′E
- Periods: Upper Paleolithic; Epipalaeolithic; Pre-Pottery Neolithic
- Cultures: Kebaran; Natufian; Khiamian
- Location: Hof HaCarmel Regional Council, Haifa District, Israel
- Region: Mount Carmel, Israeli coastal plain

Site notes
- Archaeologists: Moshe Stekelis

Nahal Oren (Hebrew: נחל אורן, lit. 'Pine Stream') is an archaeological site on the northern bank of the wadi of Nahal Oren (Hebrew)/Wadi Fallah (Arabic) on Mount Carmel, 10 km (6.2 mi) south of Haifa, Israel. The site comprises a cave and the small terrace in front of it, which steeply descends towards the wadi floor. The site was first excavated in 1941. Kebaran (Upper Paleolithic), Natufian (Epipaleolithic) and Pre-Pottery Neolithic A and B (PPNA, PPNB) industries were found.

== Grain ==
Wheat was recovered from the Nahal Oren site, but it was not certain whether it was cultivated or wild. Grain was relatively rare at the site in comparison with other food resources. The age of the emmer wheat grains found there is an indication that the cultivation of grain might have started as early as 16,000 years ago. In 1985 the three spikelets of cultivated emmer found in a Kebaran context in Wadi Oren were seen to be so early as to be considered an anomaly.

== Neolithic village ==
A PPNA village of some 13 subcircular houses and other structures stood on four artificial, closely set terraces. The buildings were similar to those of PPNA Jericho.

Only one human burial was discovered at the PPNA village site. There were no grave goods in the burial pit, and the skeleton was complete with the exception of the skull, which had been removed - an early example of a practice better known from the later Neolithic.

The remains of the PPNB village are far more scarce, but seem to be in continuation of the PPNA phase.

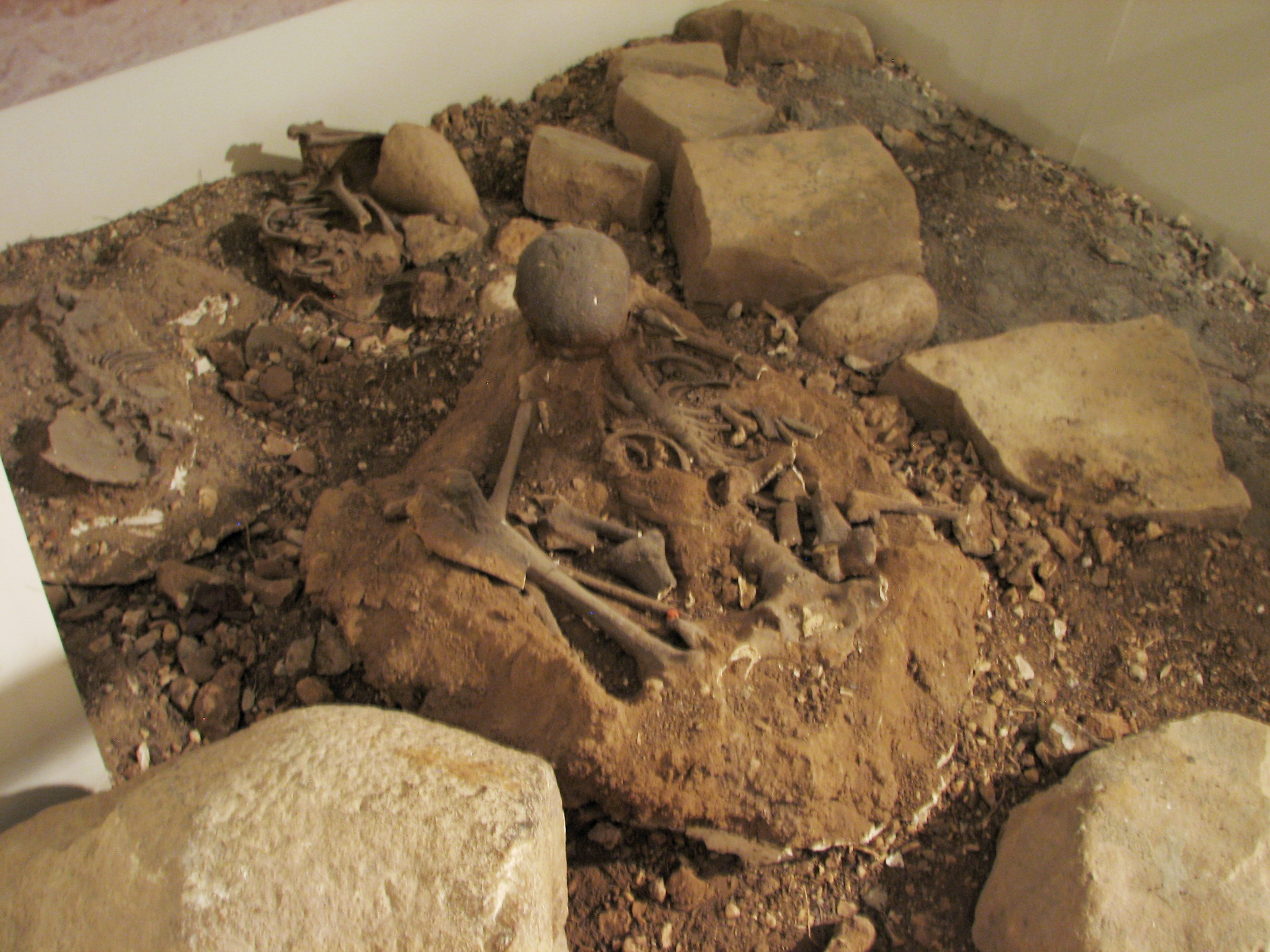
Skeletons from Nahal Oren (Miriam Stekelis Museum of Prehistory, Haifa)

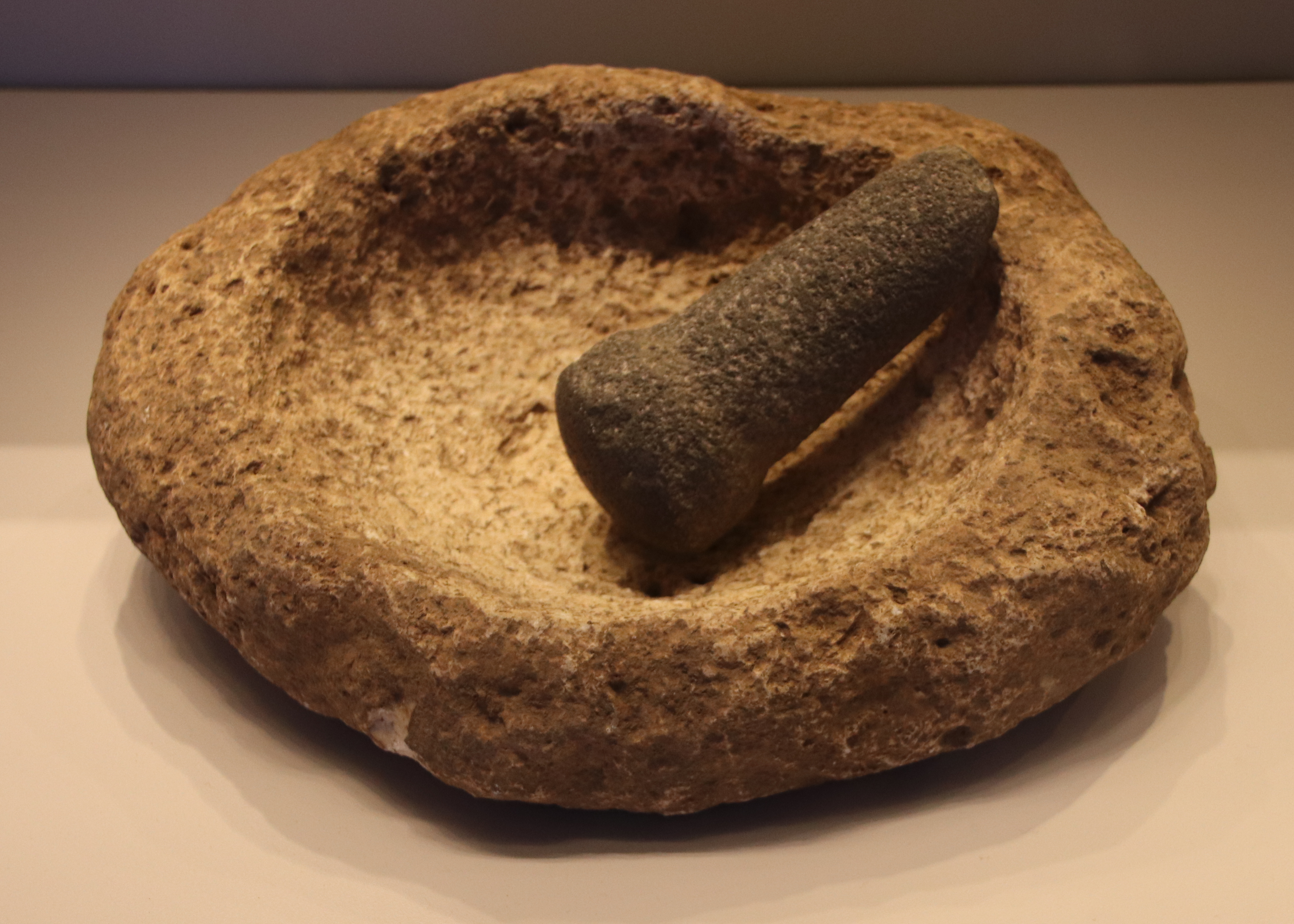
Mortar and pestle from Nahal Oren, Natufian, 12500-9500 BC.

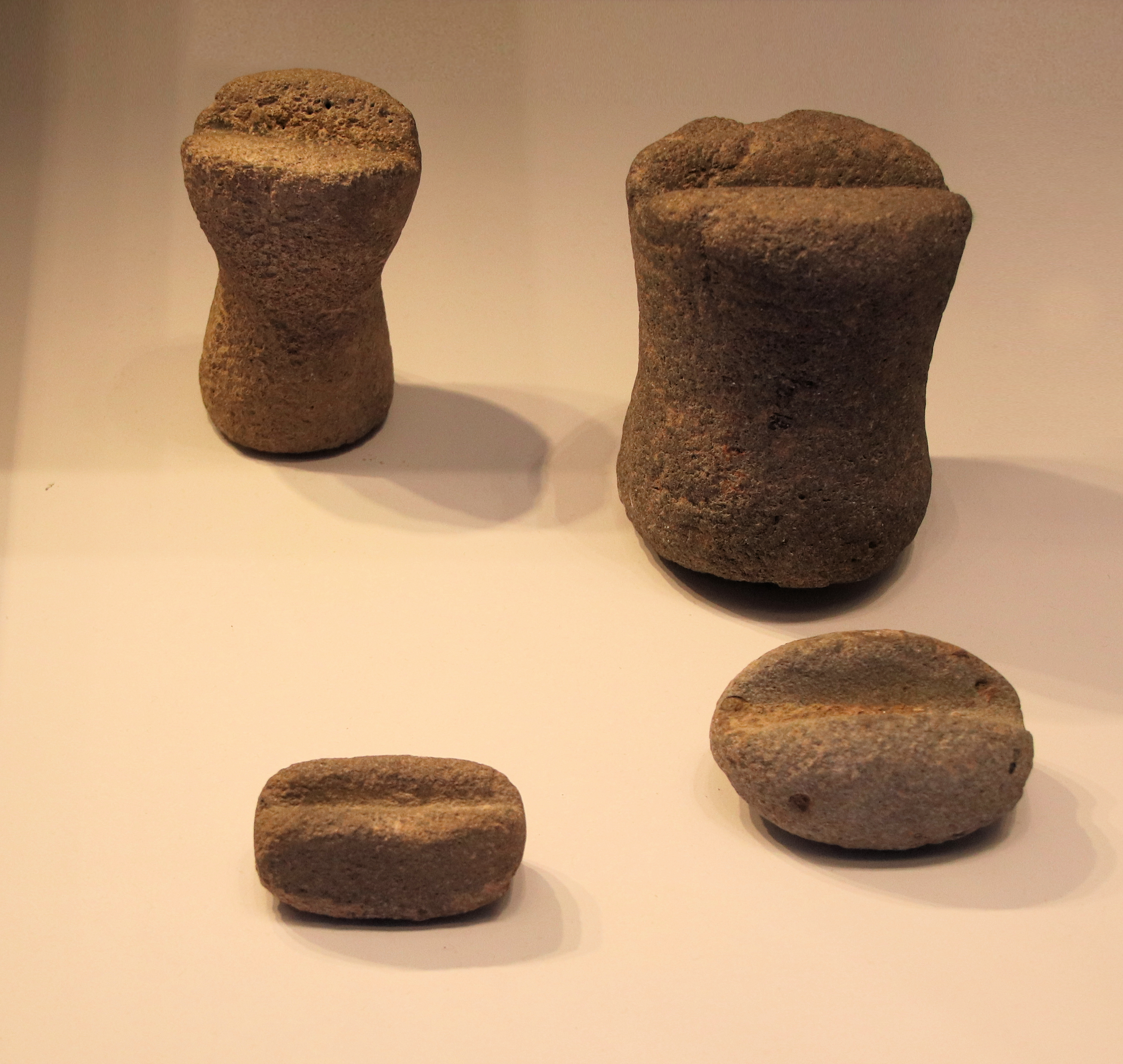
Basalt sharpening stones, Eynan ('Ain Mallaha) and Nahal Oren, Natufian Culture, 12500-9500 BC.

=== Domestication of gazelles and goats ===
During Neolithic occupation, the main source of food at the site appears to have been gazelles, and judging from the high incidence of immature gazelle bones, these animals were domesticated. The later shift to goat husbandry may have occurred because goats are less selective in their diets than gazelles, and can graze in areas where the gazelle would not fare well.

== Repeated occupation ==
Nahal Oren was occupied repeatedly over thousands of years by culture after culture, which means that it was a preferred site for occupation, rather than an occasional one.

== See also ==
- Ohalo II, a Kebaran (Upper Paleolithic) site at the Sea of Galilee containing the earliest identification of emmer wheats
