= Sha'ar HaGolan =

Place in Northern Israel

Sha'ar HaGolan: שַׁעַר הַגּוֹלָן (Hebrew)
- Kibbutz
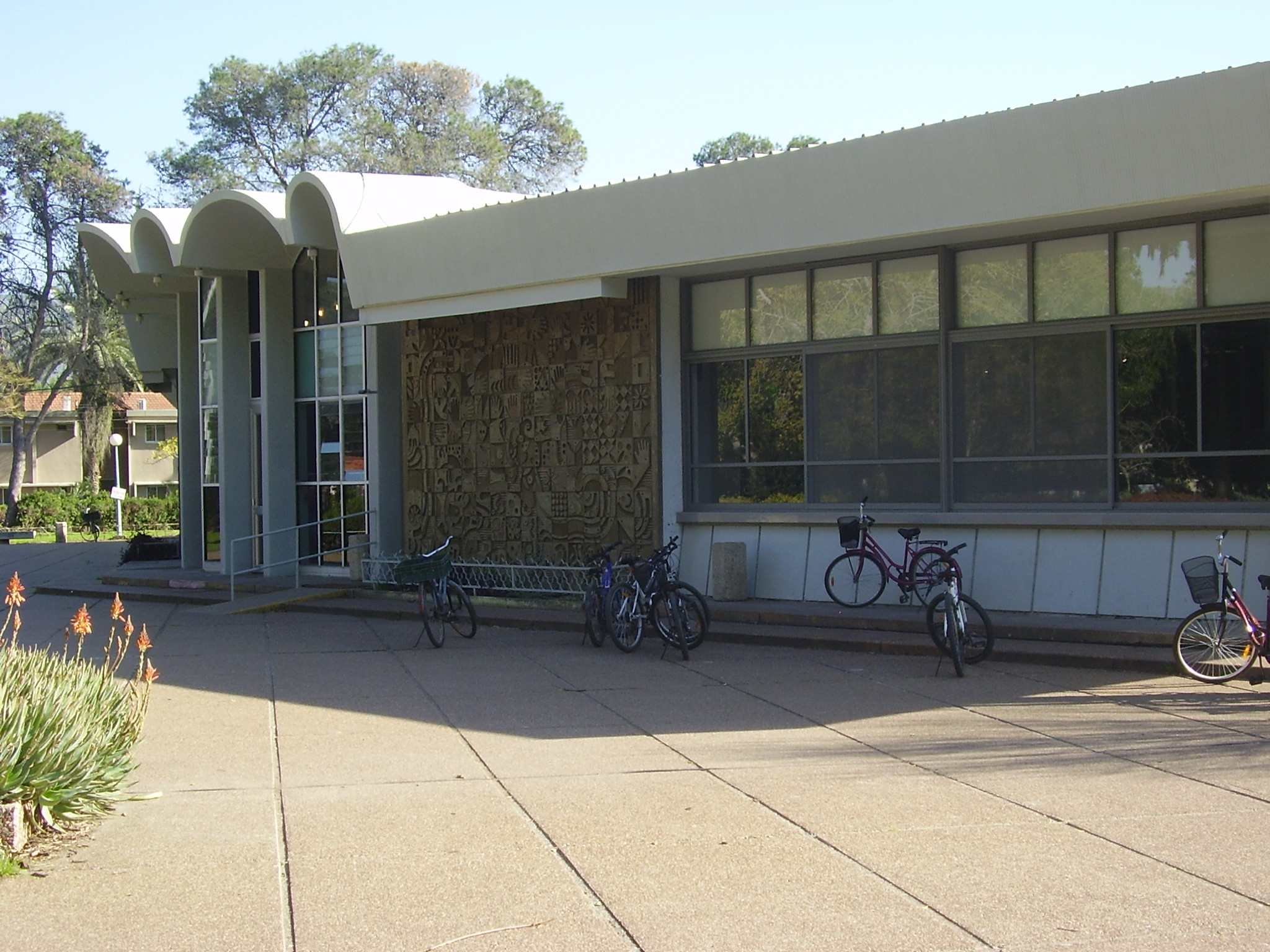
- Etymology: Gate of the Golan
- Location within Northeast Israel Location within Israel
- Coordinates: 32°41′11″N 35°36′12″E
- Country: Israel
- District: Northern
- Subdistrict: Kinneret
- Council: Emek HaYarden
- Affiliation: Kibbutz Movement
- Founded: 21 March 1937
- Founder: Czechoslovak and Polish Hashomer Hatzair members
- Population (2024): 626
- Website: www.shaar-hagolan.co.il

Sha'ar HaGolan (Hebrew: שַׁעַר הַגּוֹלָן, lit. Gate of the Golan) is a kibbutz situated at the foot of the Golan Heights in the Jordan Valley area of north-eastern Israel. Located less than 1 km from the border with Jordan, it falls under the jurisdiction of Emek HaYarden Regional Council. In 2024 it had a population of 626.

== Archaeology ==
Excavations at Sha'ar HaGolan archaeological site unearthed an 8,000-year-old village and artifacts that include the first pottery cooking pots found in the Land of Israel. This Neolithic Yarmukian village was inhabited by the people who abandoned their nomadic lifestyle in favor of permanent settlement, marking the shift from hunting and gathering to agriculture.

In July 2022, archaeologists from the Israel Antiquities Authority (IAA) announced the discovery of an 8,000-years-old "Mother goddess" figurine at Sha'ar HaGolan archaeological site. Anna Eirikh-Rose, co-director of the excavation reported that the 20-centimeter long figurine covered by a bracelet with a red bottom was found broken into 2 pieces. It was sculpted in a sitting position with big hips, a unique pointed hat and what is known as 'coffee-bean' eyes and a big nose.

== History ==
Sha'ar HaGolan was founded on 21 March 1937 by members of the Hashomer Hatzair youth movement from Czechoslovakia and Poland. The founders met and were organized as a team in 1930 in Rishon LeZion and were called "Ein Hakore" until 1937, when they established the kibbutz as a tower and stockade settlement.

During the Battles of the Kinarot Valley in the 1948 Arab–Israeli War, the defenders of Sha'ar HaGolan and of neighbouring kibbutz Masada, after withstanding a first Syrian attack and further aerial bombardment and shelling, retreated due to lack of reinforcement and direction. The kibbutzim were captured and briefly held by the Syrian Army, during which time they were looted and burned down. Although the members soon returned, a stigma was attached to them, and vindication in the form of released military records only arrived in recent years.

== Economy ==
The main source of income is a plastics engineering factory. The kibbutz also grows bananas, avocado and watermelons, and has a herd of dairy cows. Another economic sector is tourism, one of the attractions is a museum of Yarmukian culture exhibiting pre-historic Neolithic findings discovered along the banks of the Yarmuk River. Established in the 1950s, it was Israel's first museum of prehistory.

== Galleries ==
Sha'ar HaGolan 1937

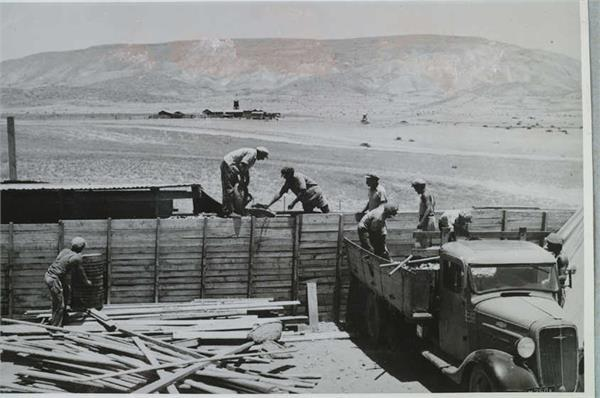
Sha’ar HaGolan from Kibbutz Masada 1937

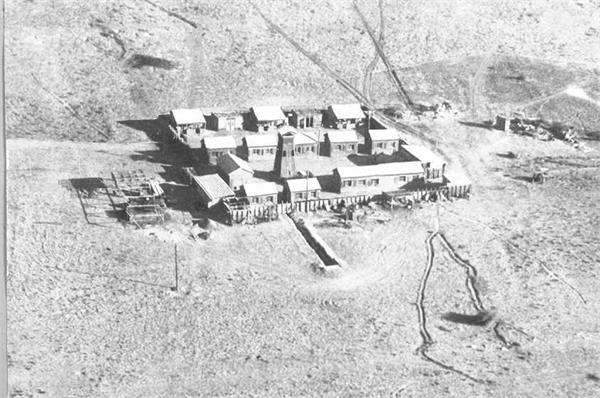
Sha’ar HaGolan 1937

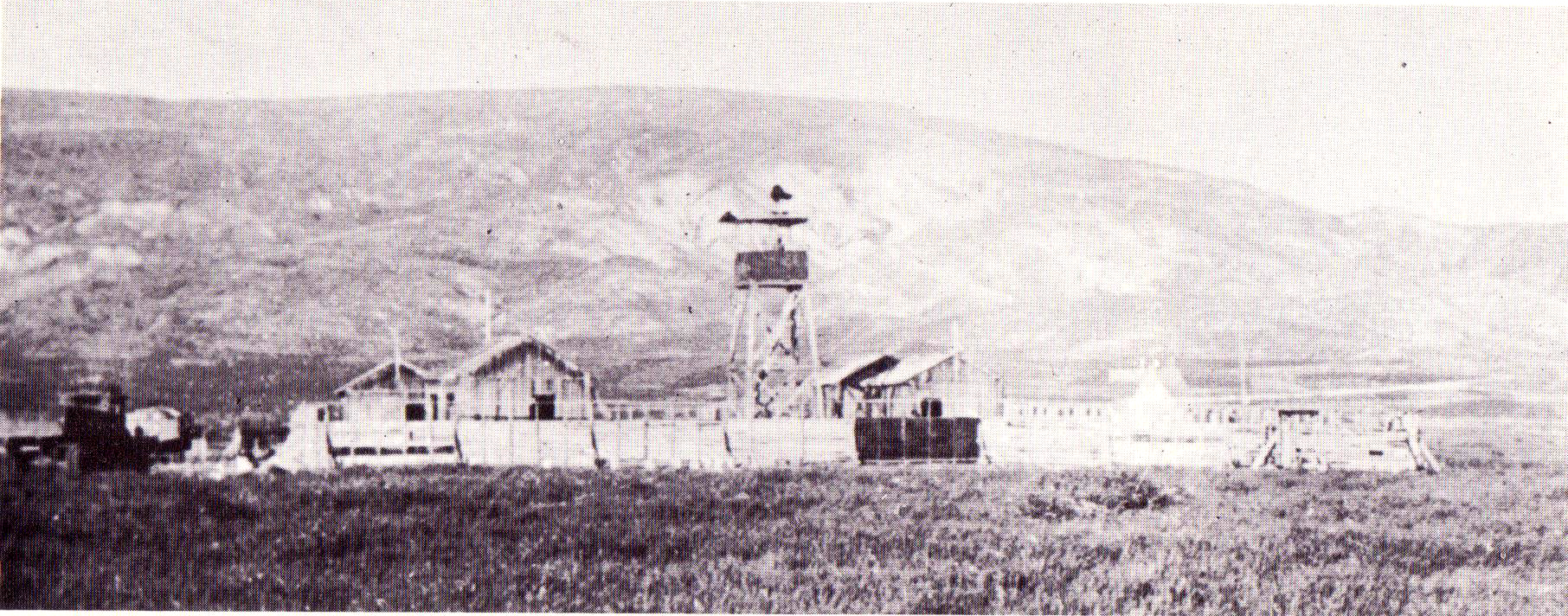
Sha'ar HaGolan 1937

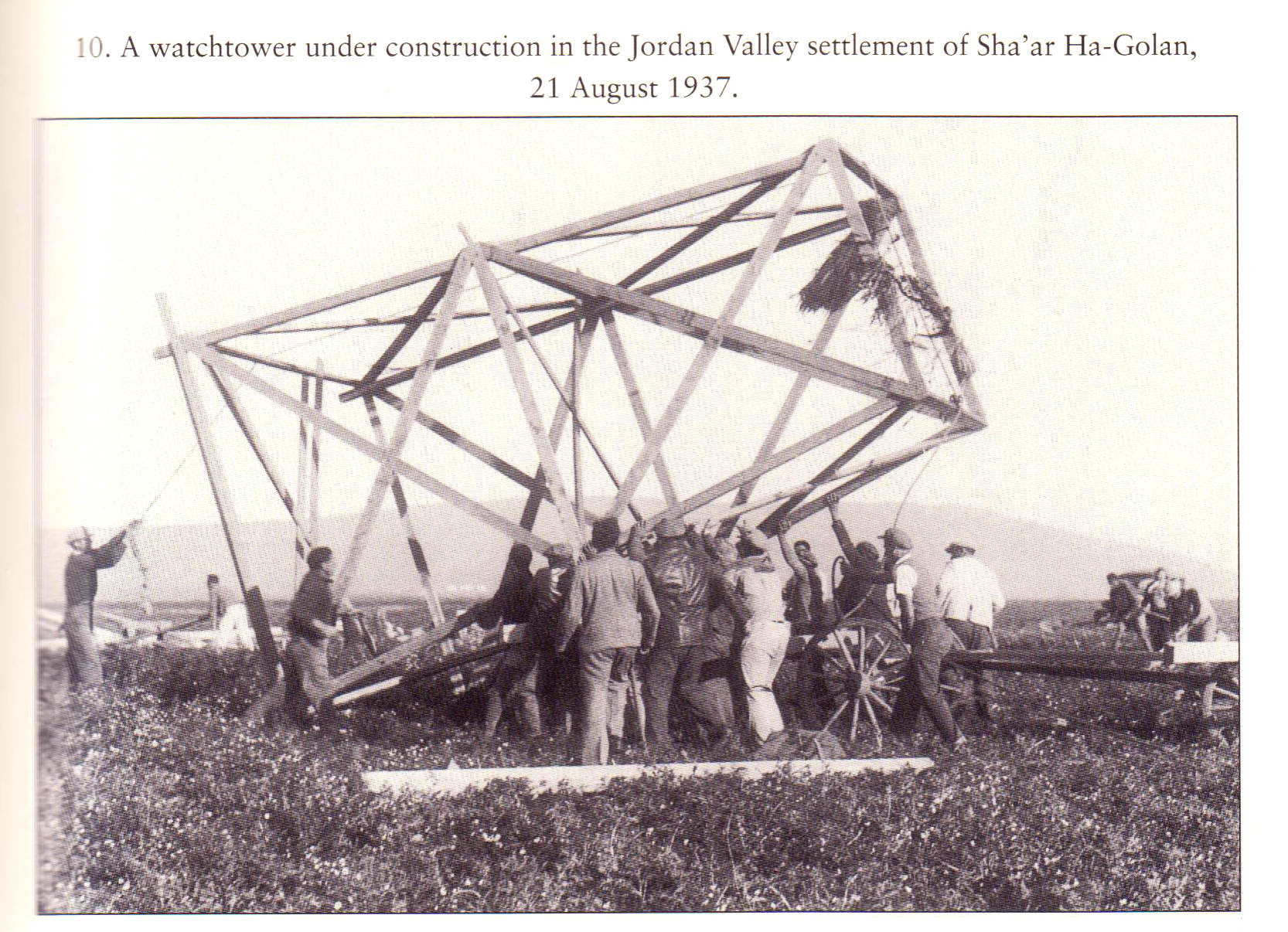
The watchtower being erected at Sha'ar HaGolan, 21 August 1937

Kibbutz Sha'ar HaGolan 2010

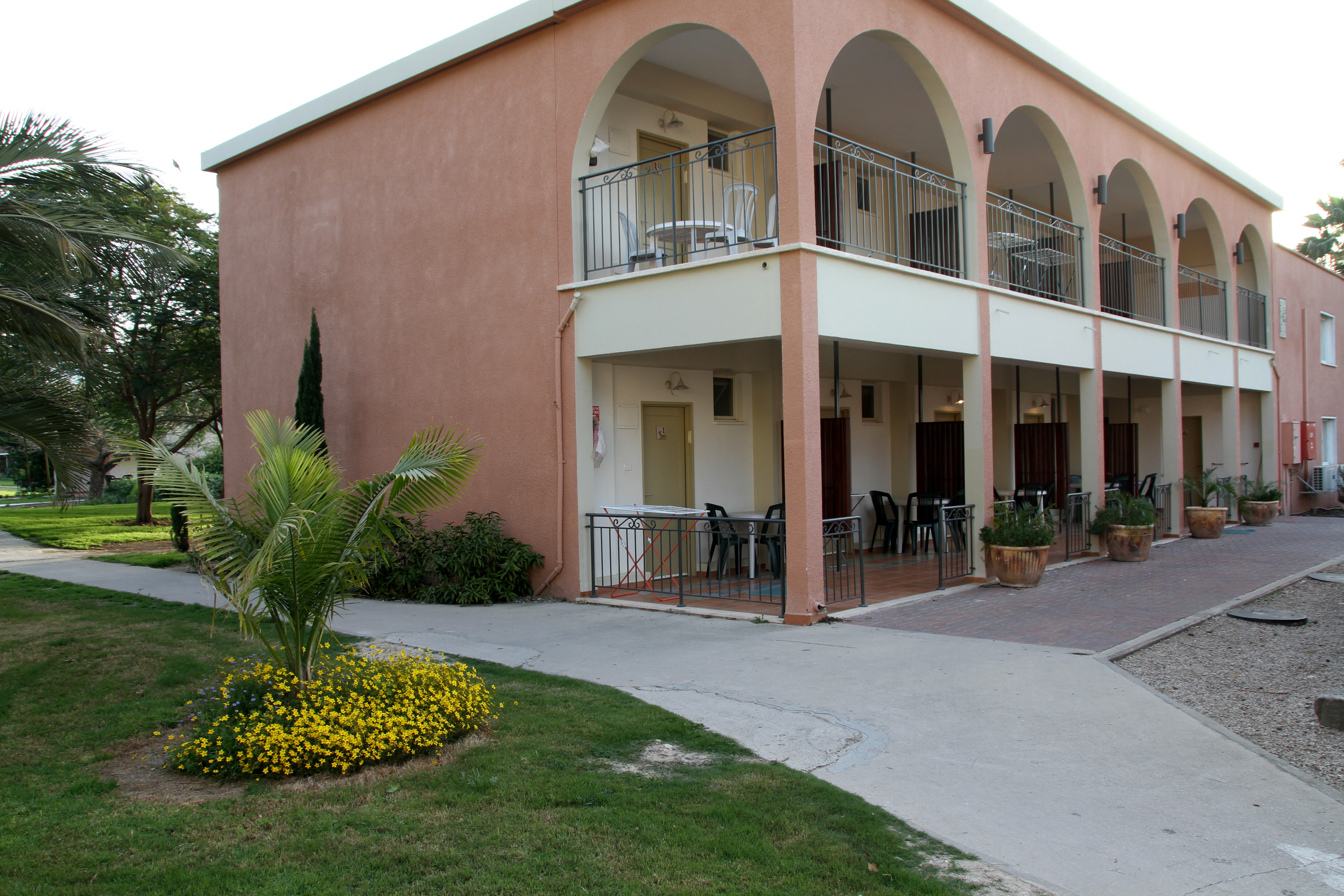
Guesthouse

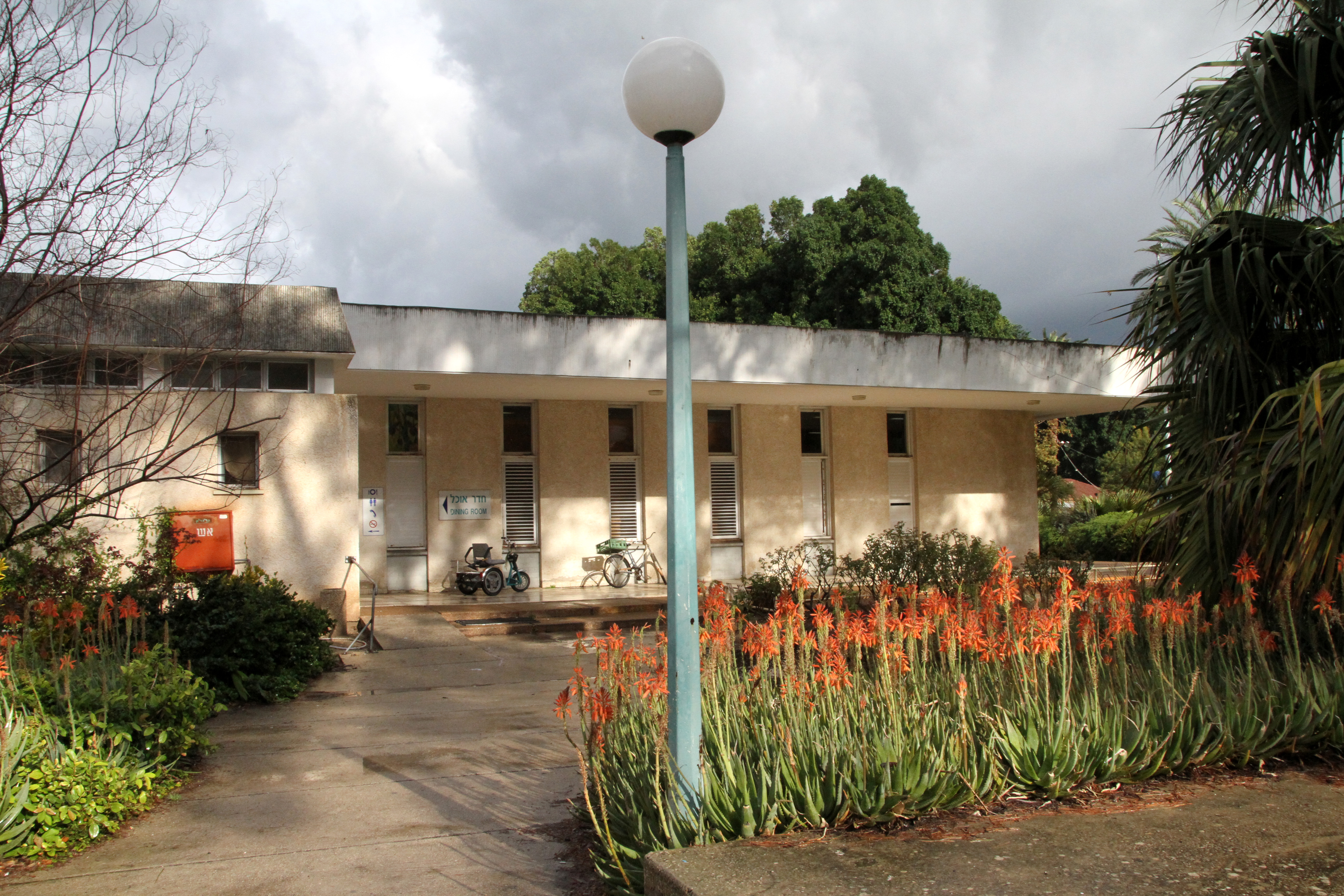
Canteen

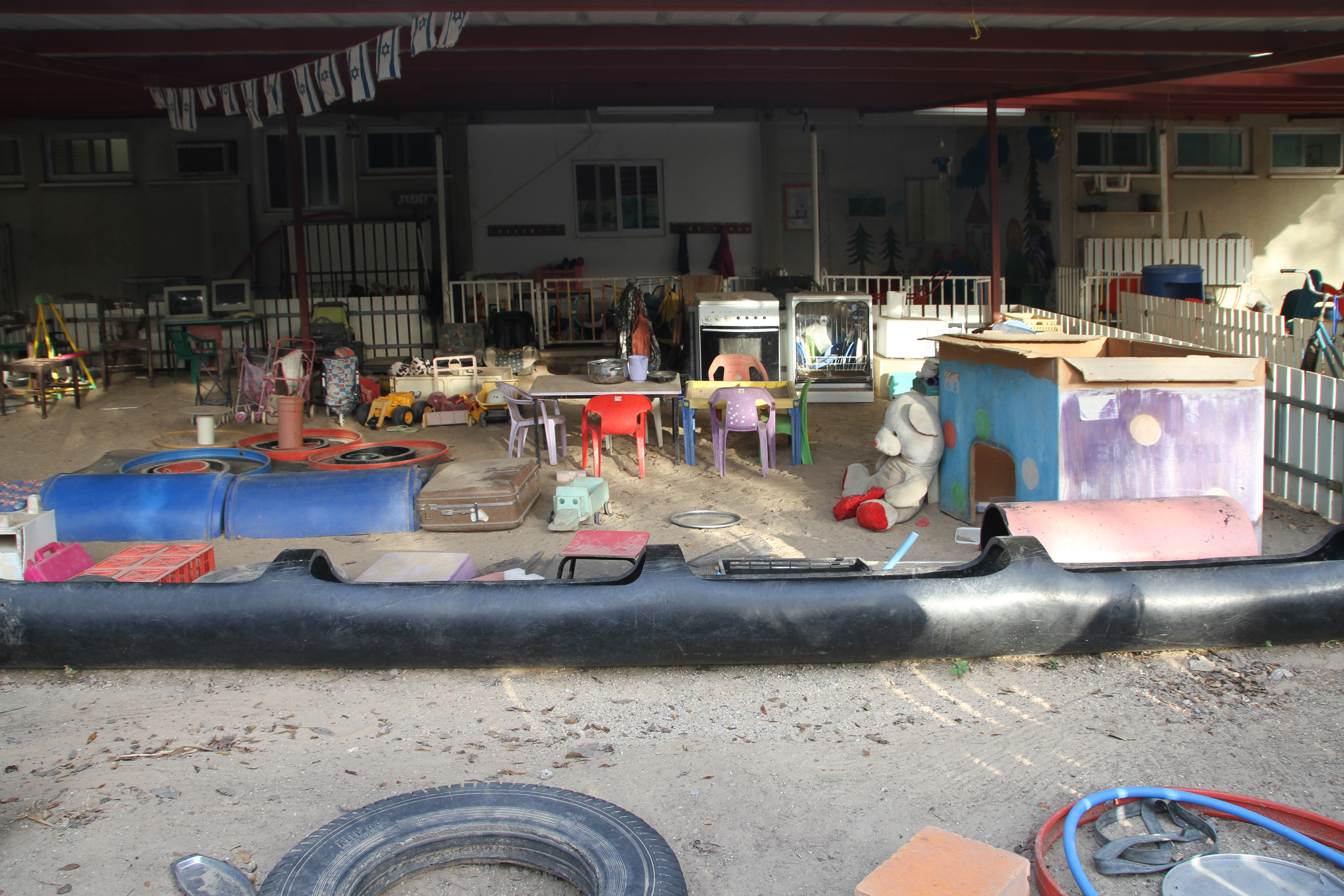
Kindergarten

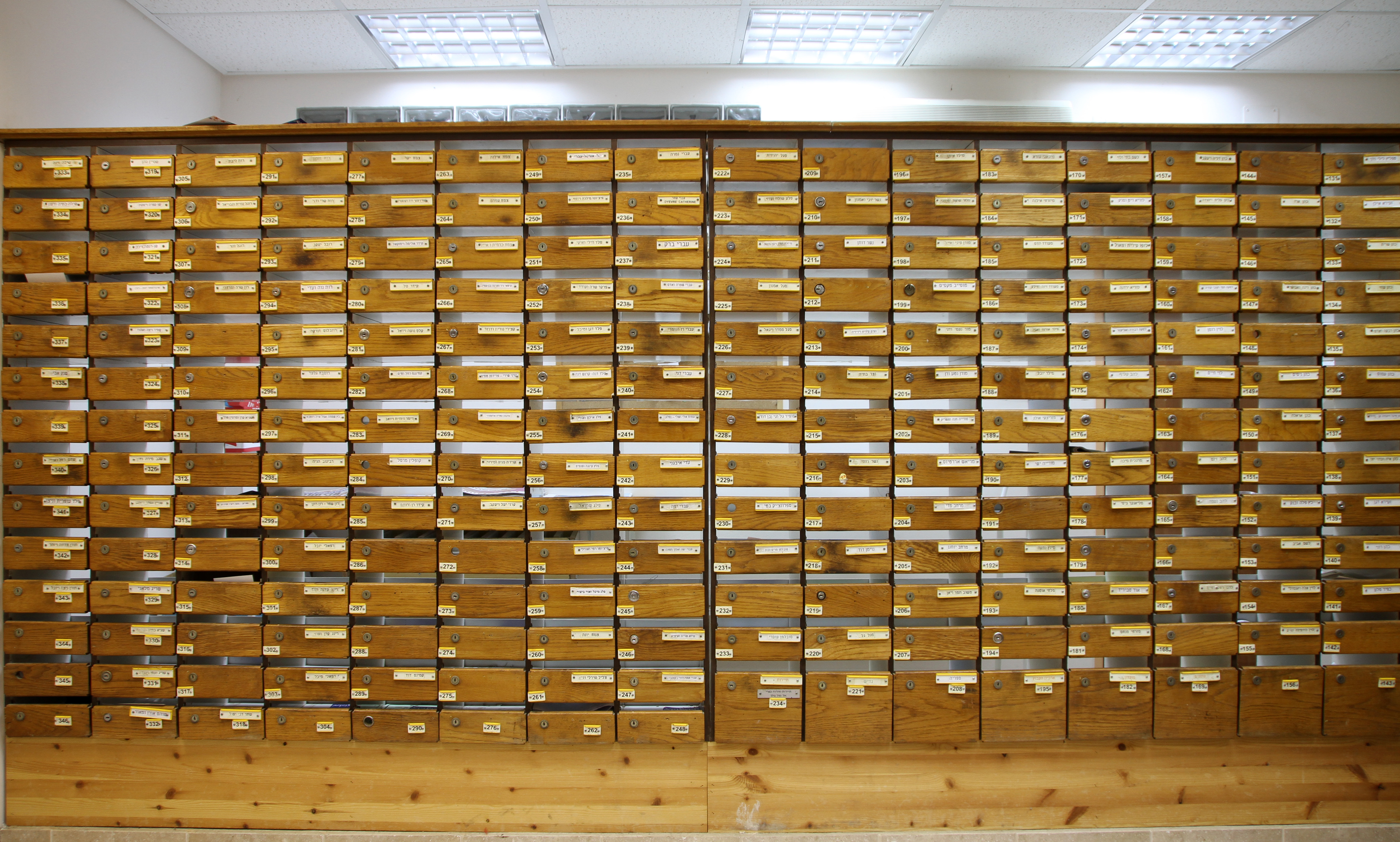
Postboxes

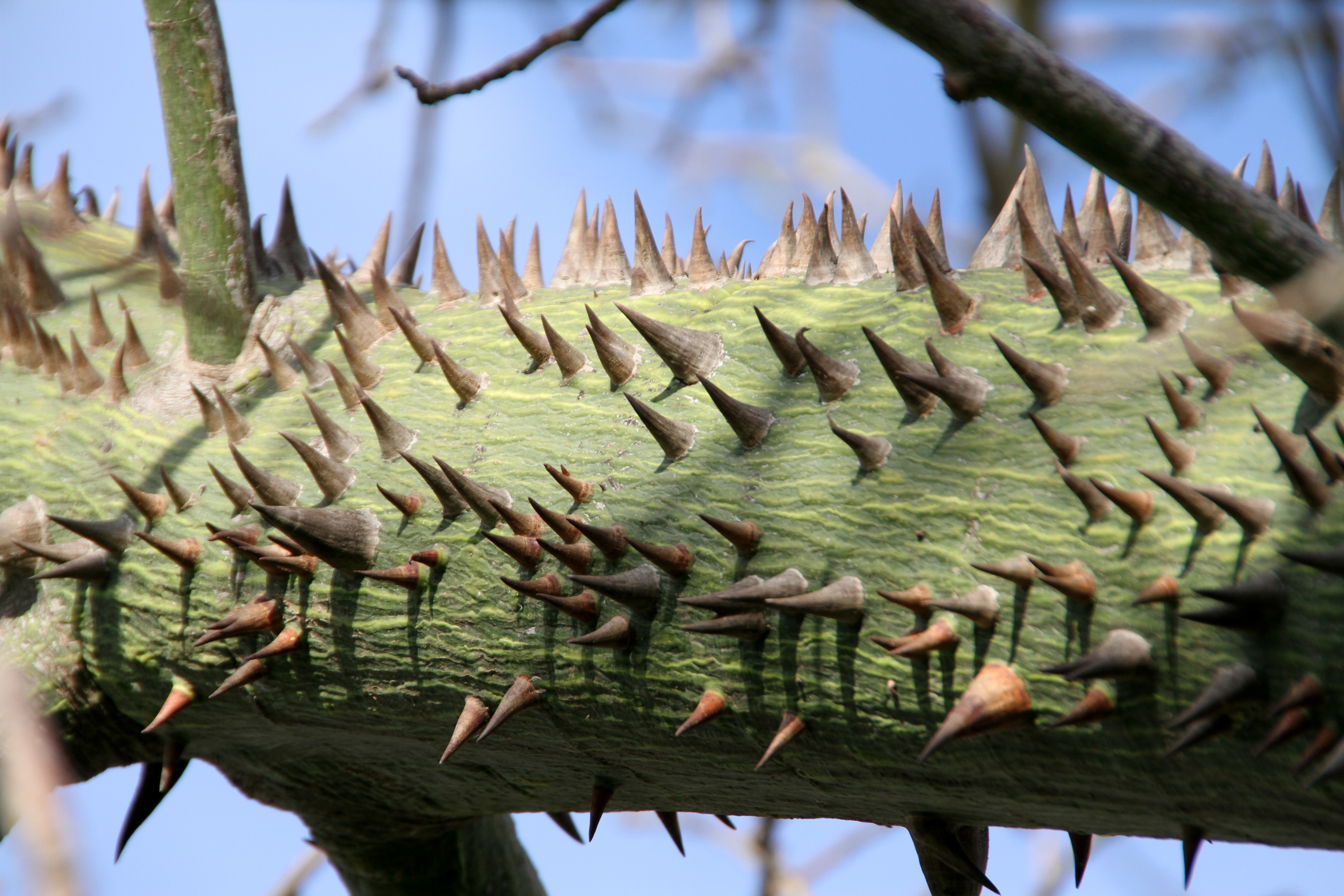
Chorisia Insignis

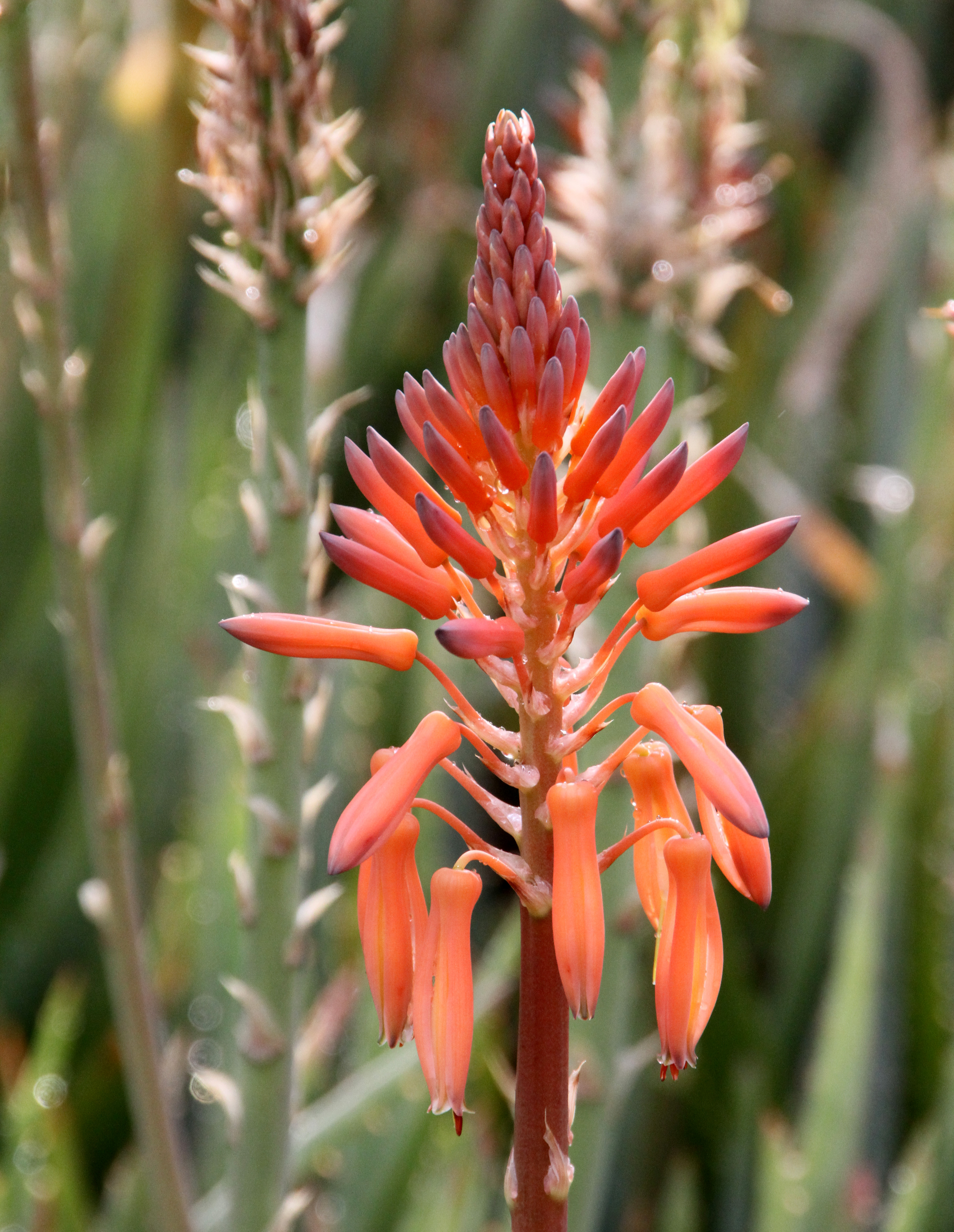
Aloe

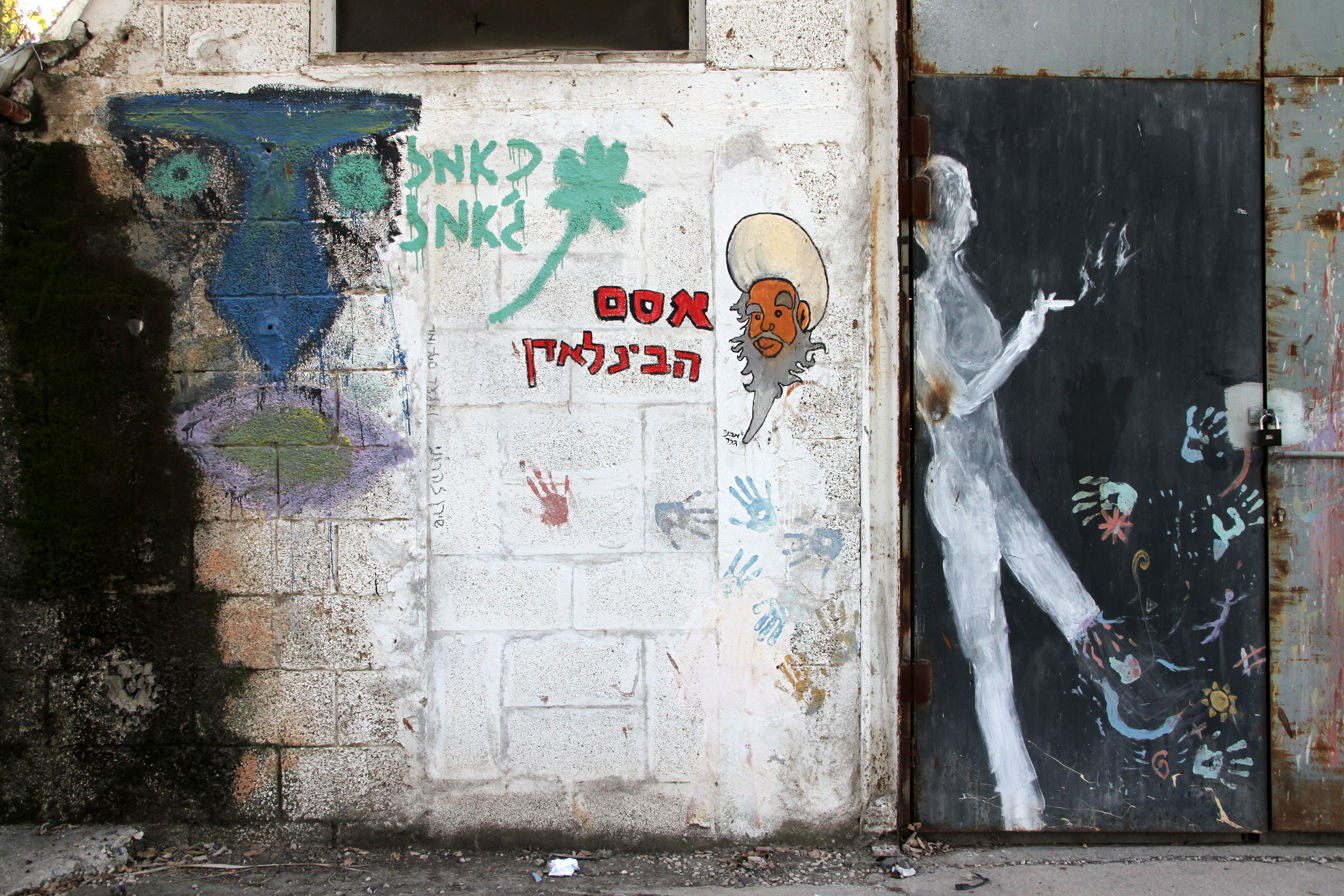
Artwork

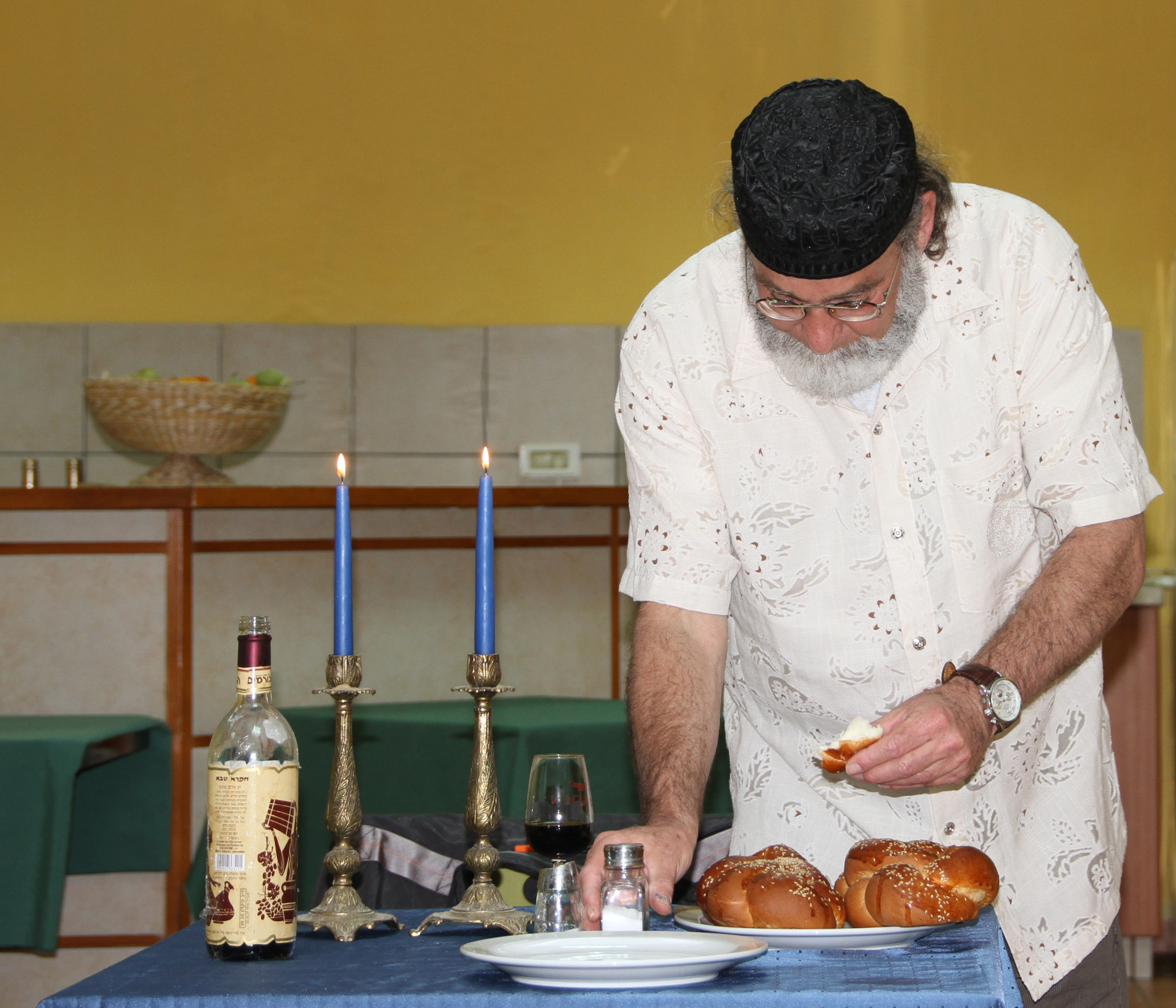
Sabbath celebration

== Notable people ==
- Miriam Roth
