= Moshe Stekelis =

- משה שטקליס
- Born: 1898
- Died: 12 March 1967 (aged 68–69)
- Known for: Excavation of Sha'ar HaGolan
- Scientific career
- Fields: Archaeology

Moshe Stekelis (Hebrew: משה שטקליס; 1898 – 14 March 1967) was a Russian born archaeologist who excavated the Neolithic Yarmukian culture at Sha'ar HaGolan.

He was born in Kamenets-Podolski in the Podolia Governorate of the Russian Empire (present-day Ukraine) and graduated with a Master's degree from Odessa University to work at the Odessa Archeological Museum as deputy director between 1921 and 1924. He was exiled to Siberia for three years for being a Zionist activist. He continued research into anthropology whilst in exile and settled in Palestine in 1928. He completed his PhD with Henri Breuil in the 1930s and went on to become professor of archaeology at the Hebrew University of Jerusalem. He made many notable discoveries during numerous excavations, working with Dorothy Garrod on the Neolithic of the Levant. It was remarked that his research and finds "shed light on early man and which are invaluable in reconstructing his development."

He died whilst planning further exploration of the Jordan valley at the age of sixty nine.
